= Ferrari 246 F1-66 =

Racing automobile

Ferrari 246 Tasman
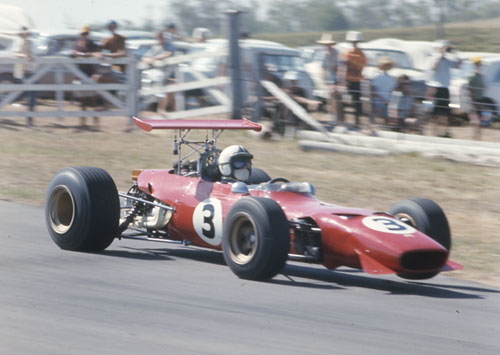
- Category: Formula One
- Constructor: Scuderia Ferrari
- Designer: Mauro Forghieri
- Predecessor: Ferrari 1512
- Successor: Ferrari 312

Technical specifications
- Chassis: Type 579/FL (in the Italian Grand Prix configuration), double wall of aluminium panels riveted to a tubular steel structure to form a stress-bearing semi-monocoque
- Suspension (front): Double wishbones, upper rocker arm, reversed lower wishbone, coil springs and inboard co-axial dampers
- Suspension (rear): Upper arm, reversed lower wishbone, co-axial spring/damper units, 2 radius arms per side
- Length: 3,950 mm (155.5 in)
- Width: 697 mm (27.4 in)
- Height: 768 mm (30.2 in)
- Axle track: 1,360 mm (53.5 in)
- Wheelbase: 2,380 mm (93.7 in)
- Engine: Ferrari Tipo 228, 2,404 cc (146.7 cu in) V6 (65°). Naturally-aspirated, rear-mounted.
- Weight: 510 kg (1,124 lb) (with water and oil)
- Tyres: Firestone, Dunlop

Competition history
- Debut: 1966 Monaco Grand Prix
Races	Wins	Poles	F/Laps
4	0	0	1
- Unless otherwise stated, all data refer to Formula One World Championship Grands Prix only.

The Ferrari 246 F1-66 (also known as 158/246 and 246T) was a racing car used by Scuderia Ferrari and Reg Parnell Racing during the 1966 Formula One season.

== Development ==
At the end of the 1965 Formula One season, a Ferrari 158 chassis was fitted with a 2.4-litre (2404.74 cc) Dino V6 engine, updated with fuel-injection, in order to take part in the 1966 Tasman Series. However, intended driver John Surtees was still recovering from injuries sustained in an accident in a Can-Am race at Mosport Park, and the Tasman entry was withdrawn. The car was then used as the second team car for the start of the 1966 Formula One season, alongside the new Ferrari 312.

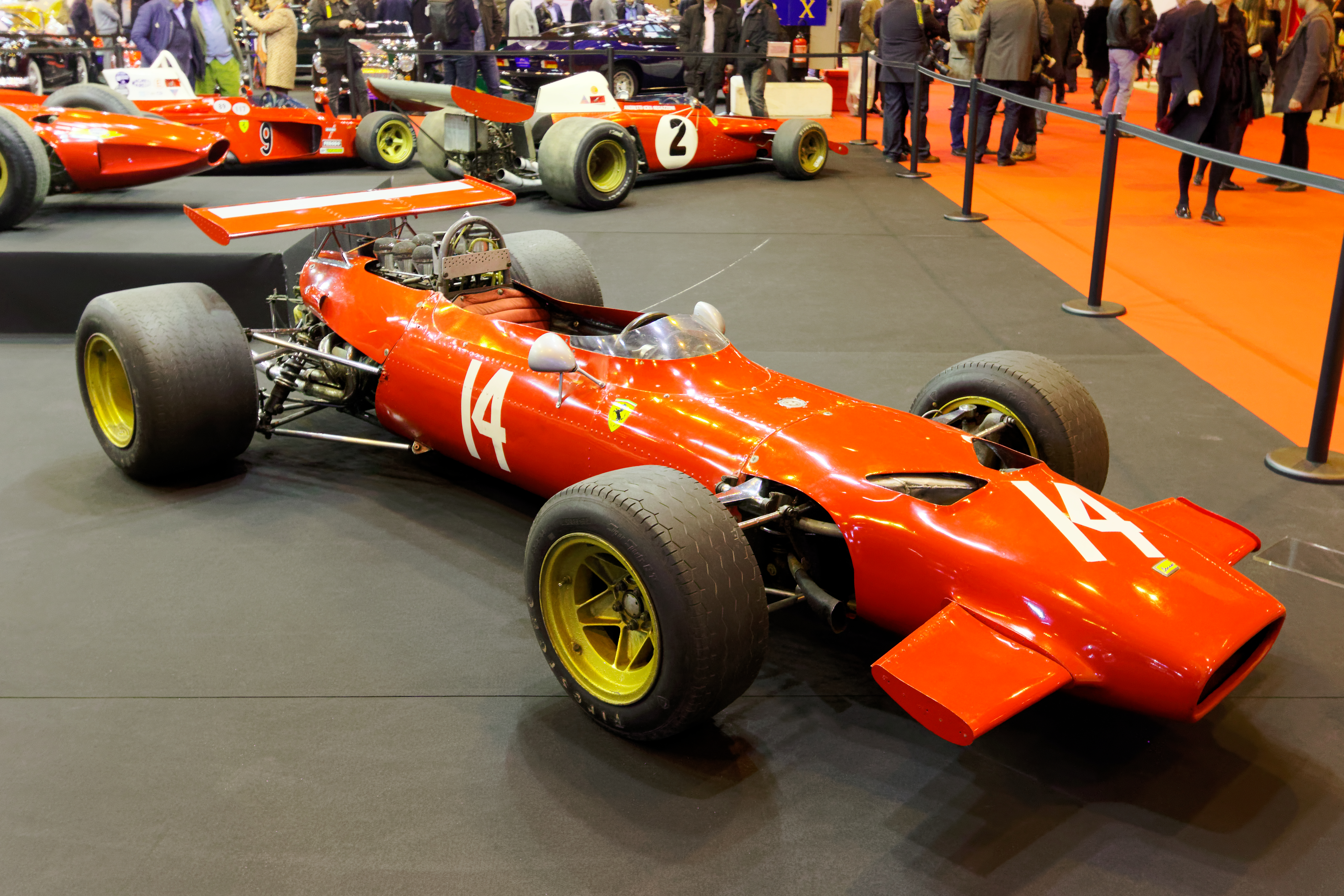
Ferrari 246 Tasman 1967

== Technical data ==
Technical data	246 F1-66
Engine:	Mid-mounted 65° 6-cylinder V-engine
displacement:	2404.74 cm³
Bore x stroke:	90 x 63 mm
Compression:	11.2:1
Max power at rpm:	249 hp at 8 500 rpm
Valve control:	Dual Overhead Camshafts per cylinder banktwin, two valves per cylinder
Valves per cylinder:	2 pcs
Fuel system:	Lucas indirect fuel injection
Gearbox:	5-speed manual
suspension front:	Independent, unequal-length wishbones, co-axial springs and telescopic shock absorbers
suspension rear:	Independent, upper lever arm, reversed lower wishbone, twin radius arms, co-axial springs and telescopic shock absorbers, anti-roll bar
Brakes:	Hydraulic disc brakes
Chassis & body:	Semi-monocoque, tubular steel chassis with riveted aluminium panels
Wheelbase:	238 cm
Dry weight:	510 kg

== Racing history ==
Lorenzo Bandini used the 246T for the first two races in 1966. His best result was second place and fastest lap at the 1966 Monaco Grand Prix, followed by third place in Belgium. The car was then put aside until the German Grand Prix, where it was a third team entry driven by Ludovico Scarfiotti. Scarfiotti out-qualified his teammates in their more powerful 3-litre cars, but retired with electrical problems. The final outing for the 246T was the 1966 Italian Grand Prix, lent by Ferrari to Reg Parnell Racing and driven by Giancarlo Baghetti. Baghetti was running as high as fifth until he had problems with his throttle linkage and eventually finished last, nine laps in arrears.

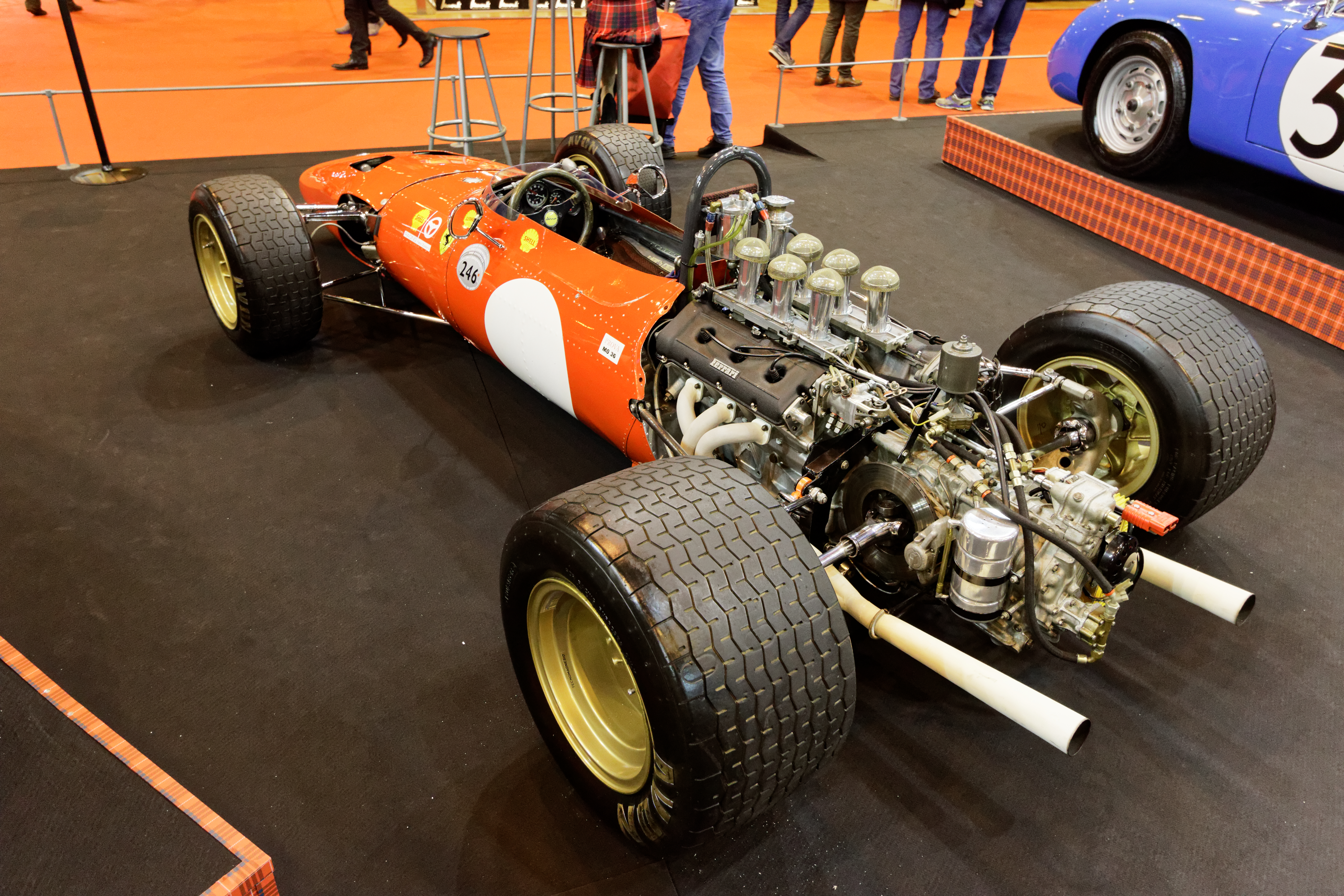
A 1968 Ferrari Dino 166-246 Tasman F2 on display at the Salon Rétromobile show 2016

== Complete Formula One World Championship results ==
(key) (Races in italics indicate fastest lap)

Year	Team	Engine	Tyres	Drivers	1	2	3	4	5	6	7	8	9	Points	WCC
1966	Scuderia Ferrari	Ferrari 2.4 V6	F		MON	BEL	FRA	GBR	NED	GER	ITA	USA	MEX	31 (32)*	2nd
1966	Scuderia Ferrari	Ferrari 2.4 V6	F	Lorenzo Bandini	2	3								31 (32)*	2nd
1966	Scuderia Ferrari	Ferrari 2.4 V6	F	Ludovico Scarfiotti						Ret				31 (32)*	2nd
1966	Reg Parnell Racing	Ferrari 2.4 V6	F	Giancarlo Baghetti							NC			31 (32)*	2nd

* Only 6 points which counted towards Ferrari's Championship total were scored using the 246; the remaining points were scored using the 312.

== Non-Championship Formula One results ==
(key) (results in bold indicate pole position; results in italics indicate fastest lap)

Year	Entrant	Engine	Tyres	Drivers	1	2	3	4
1966	SpA Ferrari SEFAC	Ferrari 2.4 V6	**F** **D**		RSA	SYR	INT	OUL
1966	SpA Ferrari SEFAC	Ferrari 2.4 V6	**F** **D**	Lorenzo Bandini		2		
