= Jo Schlesser =

French racing driver (1928–1968)

- Born: 18 May 1928; Liouville, Meuse, France
- Died: 7 July 1968 (aged 40); Rouen-Les-Essarts, Seine-Maritime, France

Formula One World Championship career
- Nationality: (France) French
- Active years: 1966–1968
- Team(s): Matra, Honda
- Entries: 3
- Championships: 0
- Wins: 0
- Podiums: 0
- Career points: 0
- Pole positions: 0
- Fastest laps: 0
- First entry: 1966 German Grand Prix
- Last entry: 1968 French Grand Prix

Championship titles
- French Formula Junior Championship (1962, 1963); Major victories Daytona 2000 (1965); 12 Hours of Sebring (1965); 12 Hours of Reims (1965, 1967)

Joseph Théodule Marie Schlesser (18 May 1928 – 7 July 1968) was a French Formula One and sports car racing driver. He participated in three World Championship Grands Prix, including the 1968 French Grand Prix in which he was killed. He scored no championship points. He was the uncle of Jean-Louis Schlesser who was a Formula One driver in the 1980s.

== Early career ==
Schlesser began his motor sport career in 1952, when he rallied a Panhard before, in 1954, trying the then popular French class of racing known as Monomill. His career was then interrupted for three years whilst he was working in Mozambique but he returned to Europe in 1957 when he finished second in the Rome–Liège–Rome Rally in a Mercedes. He then raced a Ferrari 250 GT but without much success until 1960 when he finished second in class at the Nürburgring 1000 km and second overall at Rouen. He also raced a Cooper in Formula Two in 1960 but only achieved a sixth place at Syracuse. In 1961, his season was cut short by an accident at Le Mans, but he returned in 1962 with a Formula Junior Brabham.

In 1964. Schlesser moved to the new one-litre Formula Two and became a highly regarded competitor in European Formula Two in the pre-European Formula Two Championship era. In 1966, he joined the works Matra Formula Two team and continued with the same team as Ford France in 1967. In 1968, he joined his close friend Guy Ligier to race McLarens.

Schlesser also raced in NASCAR, finishing 13th in the 1964 Daytona 500 as a teammate to Ned Jarrett.

== Formula Two ==
Schlesser participated in the 1966 German Grand Prix at the Nürburgring with a Formula Two (F2) specification Matra MS5-BRM 1.0 litre and again in 1967 at the same venue with an F2 Matra MS5-Cosworth 1.6 litre. In 1966, he finished tenth in the overall classification and third in the Formula Two classification. In 1967, he was forced to retire with a clutch problem after two laps.

== Formula One and death ==
An opportunity for a Formula One seat came for Schlesser in the 1968 French Grand Prix with Honda. The Honda team had completed an experimental air-cooled Formula One car (the RA302) which had been tested by their works driver John Surtees. Surtees pronounced it as not ready for racing, and a potential deathtrap. Undaunted, and with the financial help of Honda France, Honda entered it for the French Grand Prix at Rouen. Being the local hero, Schlesser was hired to drive it. After two laps, the car slid wide at the Six Frères corner and crashed sideways into a bank. The magnesium-bodied Honda and 58 laps' worth of fuel ignited instantly, leaving Schlesser no chance of survival. As a result, Honda withdrew from Formula One at the end of the 1968 season after Surtees had again refused to drive the car in the Italian Grand Prix.

== Legacy ==
Guy Ligier, a close friend, former teammate and business partner, established his company Ligier Cars shortly after Schlesser's death, in fulfillment of the dream that they had shared, to build a "good car". Ligier cars would receive type designators beginning with "JS" as a tribute to Schlesser. This tradition is being continued by Onroak, the current owner of Ligier Cars. Italian company Dallara would later adopt this style of nomenclature for their 2012 IndyCar entry by naming it after the new car's test driver Dan Wheldon, who had died in the final race of the new car's predecessor.

His nephew, Jean-Louis Schlesser, would also become a successful racing driver. He started in one Formula One Grand Prix, won the World Sportscar Championship and the Paris–Dakar Rally twice (1999 and 2000).

== Racing record ==
=== 24 Hours of Le Mans results ===
Year	Team	Co-Drivers	Car	Class	Laps	Pos.	Class Pos.
1957	(France) Automobiles D. B.	(France) Jean-Claude Vidilles	DB HBR-Panhard	S750	126	DNF	DNF
1960	(United States) North American Racing Team	(United States) Bill Sturgis	Ferrari 250 GT California	GT; 3.0	253	DNF	DNF
1963	(United Kingdom) David Brown Racing Dept.	(United States) William Kimberly	Aston Martin DP214	P +3.0	139	DNF	DNF
1964	(United States) Ford Motor Company	(United Kingdom) Richard Attwood	Ford GT40 Mk.I	P 5.0	58	DNF	DNF
1965	Ford France S.A.	(United States) Allen Grant	AC Cobra Daytona Coupé-Ford	GT; 5.0	111	DNF	DNF
1966	(France) Matra Sport	(United Kingdom) Alan Rees	Matra MS620-BRM	P 2.0	100	DNF	DNF
1967	Ford France S.A.	(France) Guy Ligier	Ford Mk IIB	P +5.0	183	DNF	DNF

=== NASCAR ===
(key) (Bold – Pole position awarded by qualifying time. Italics – Pole position earned by points standings or practice time. * – Most laps led.)

==== Grand National Series ====
NASCAR Grand National Series results
Year	Team	No.	Make	1	2	3	4	5	6	7	8	9	10	11	12	13	14	15	16	17	18	19	20	21	22	23	24	25	26	27	28	29	30	31	32	33	34	35	36	37	38	39	40	41	42	43	44	45	46	47	48	49	50	51	52	53	54	55	56	57	58	59	60	61	62	NGNC	Pts	Ref
1964	Bondy Long	77	Ford	CON	AUG	JSP	SVH	RSD	DAY	DAY; 9	DAY; 13	RCH	BRI	GPS	BGS	ATL	AWS	HBO	PIF	CLB	NWS	MAR	SVH	DAR	LGY	HCY	SBO	CLT	GPS	ASH	ATL	CON	NSV	CHT	BIR	VAL	PIF	DAY	ODS	OBS	BRR	ISP	GLN	LIN	BRI	NSV	MBS	AWS	DTS	ONA	CLB	BGS	STR	DAR	HCY	RCH	ODS	HBO	MAR	SVH	NWS	CLT	HAR	AUG	JAC	NA	0	

===== Daytona 500 =====
Year	Team	Manufacturer	Start	Finish
1964	Bondy Long	Ford	18	13

=== Complete Formula One World Championship results ===
(key)

Year	Entrant	Chassis	Engine	1	2	3	4	5	6	7	8	9	10	11	12	WDC	Pts
1966	Matra Sports	Matra MS5 F2	Ford Cosworth SCA 1.0 L4	MON	BEL	FRA	GBR	NED	GER; 10	ITA	USA	MEX				NC	0
1967	Écurie Ford-France	Matra MS5 F2	Ford Cosworth FVA 1.6 L4	RSA	MON	NED	BEL	FRA	GBR	GER; Ret	CAN	ITA	USA	MEX		NC	0
1968	Honda France	Honda RA302	Honda RA302E 3.0 V8	RSA	ESP	MON	BEL	NED	FRA; Ret	GBR	GER	ITA	CAN	USA	MEX	NC	0

=== Non-championship Formula One results ===
(key)

Year	Entrant	Chassis	Engine	1	2	3	4	5	6	7	8	9	10	11	12	13	14	15	16	17	18	19	20	21
1961	Equipe Lausanne	Cooper T51	Climax FPF 1.5 L4	LOM	GLV	PAU; 7	BRX; DNQ	VIE	AIN	SYR	NAP	LON	SIL	SOL	KAN	DAN	MOD							
1961	Inter-Autocourse	Cooper T51	Climax FPF 1.5 L4															FLG; 8	OUL	LEW	VAL	RAN	NAT	RSA
1962	Equipe Lausanne	Cooper T51	Climax FPF 1.5 L4	CAP	BRX	LOM	LAV	GLV	PAU; 10	AIN	INT	NAP	MAL	CLP	RMS	SOL	KAN	MED	DAN	OUL	MEX	RAN	NAT	
1963	Inter-Autocourse	Brabham BT2	Ford 105E 1.5 L4	LOM	GLV	PAU; Ret	IMO; 4	SYR	AIN	INT	ROM	SOL	KAN											
1963	Jo Schlesser	Brabham BT2	Ford 105E 1.5 L4											MED; 11	AUT	OUL	RAN							
1965	John Willment Automobiles	Lola T55 F2	Ford Cosworth SCA 1.0 L4	ROC; DSQ	SYR	SMT	INT	MED	RAN															
1967	Écurie Ford-France	Matra MS5 F2	Ford Cosworth FVA 1.6 L4	ROC	SPR	INT	SYR; DNS	OUL; 4	ESP; 5															

=== Complete European Formula Two Championship results ===
(key)

Year	Entrant	Chassis	Engine	1	2	3	4	5	6	7	8	9	10	Pos.	Pts
1967	Ford France	Matra MS5	Ford	SNE	SIL	NÜR	HOC	TUL	JAR	ZAN; Ret	PER; 4	BRH; 3	VAL	8th	13
1968	Ecurie Inter-Sport	McLaren M4A	Ford	HOC; 6	THR; Ret	JAR; 8	PAL; 5	TUL	ZAN	PER	HOC	VAL		11th	5

Preceded by Bob Anderson	Formula One fatal accidents 7 July 1968	Succeeded by Gerhard Mitter
