= Vic Wilson (racing driver) =

British racing driver (1931–2001)

- Born: 14 April 1931; Drypool, Hull, England
- Died: 14 January 2001 (aged 69); Gerrards Cross, Buckinghamshire, England

Formula One World Championship career
- Nationality: (United Kingdom) British
- Active years: 1960, 1966
- Team(s): non-works Cooper, non-works BRM
- Entries: 2 (1 start)
- Championships: 0
- Wins: 0
- Podiums: 0
- Career points: 0
- Pole positions: 0
- Fastest laps: 0
- First entry: 1960 Italian Grand Prix
- Last entry: 1966 Belgian Grand Prix

Victor Arthur Wilson (14 April 1931 – 14 January 2001) was a British racing driver.

Born in Hull and raised in South Africa, Wilson participated in two Formula One World Championship Grands Prix, the 1960 Italian Grand Prix at Monza and the 1966 Belgian Grand Prix at Spa-Francorchamps. In the former, he drove a private Cooper-Climax and retired just before half-distance, while in the latter he was entered in a private BRM but was forced to give his car to American Bob Bondurant before the race. He also participated in some non-Championship Formula One races.

After racing, Wilson worked as a motor dealer before dying in a motor accident at Gerrards Cross, Buckinghamshire.

== Complete Formula One World Championship results ==
(key)

Year	Entrant	Chassis	Engine	1	2	3	4	5	6	7	8	9	10	WDC	Points
1960	Equipe Prideaux	Cooper T43	Climax Straight-4	ARG	MON	500	NED	BEL	FRA	GBR	POR	ITA; Ret	USA	NC	0
1966	Team Chamaco Collect	BRM P261	BRM V8	MON	BEL; PO‡	FRA	GBR	NED	GER	ITA	USA	MEX		NC	0

‡ The car was driven in the race by Bob Bondurant.
