= 1966 BRDC International Trophy =

- Non-championship race in the 1966 Formula One season
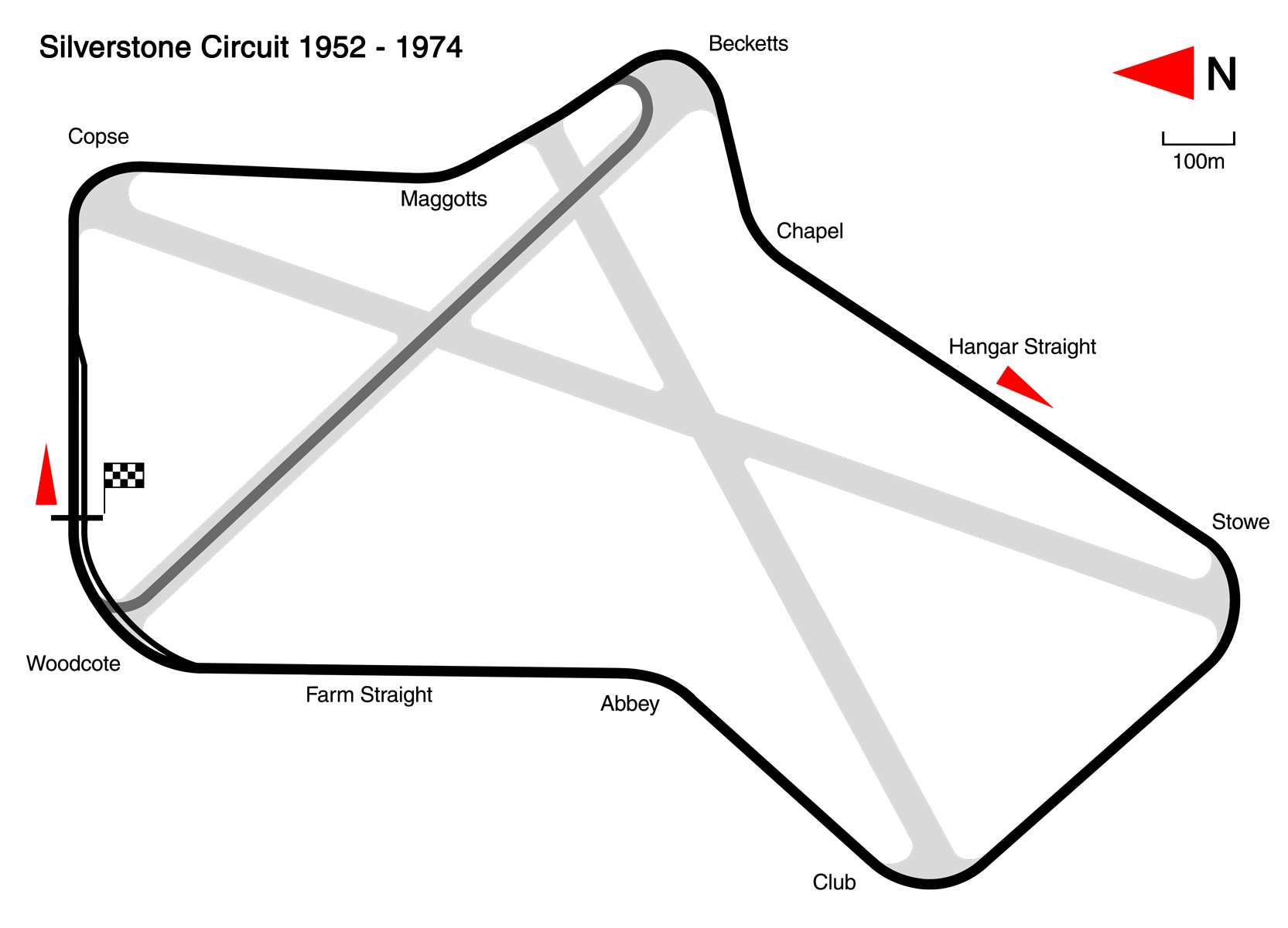

Race details
- Date: 14 May 1966
- Official name: XVIII BRDC International Trophy
- Location: Silverstone Circuit, Northamptonshire
- Course: Permanent racing facility
- Course length: 4.711 km (2.927 miles)
- Distance: 35 laps, 165.003 km (102.528 miles)

Pole position
Driver	(Australia) Jack Brabham	Brabham-Repco
- Time: 1:29.8

Fastest lap
Driver	(Australia) Jack Brabham	Brabham-Repco
- Time: 1:29.8

Podium
First	(Australia) Jack Brabham	Brabham-Repco
Second	(United Kingdom) John Surtees	Ferrari
Third	(Sweden) Jo Bonnier	Cooper-Maserati

The 18th BRDC International Trophy was a motor race, run to Formula One rules, held on 14 May 1966 at the Silverstone Circuit, England. The race was run over 35 laps of the Silverstone Grand Prix circuit, and was won by Australian Jack Brabham in the Brabham-Repco BT19. With no Race of Champions in 1966, the International Trophy formed the first major race of the European season, being run just a week before the start of the FIA World Championship in Monaco. The 1966 season was significant, as changes to the F1 formula had allowed an increase in engine capacity from 1.5L to 3L. This then was the first opportunity for many teams to test their new cars against top-line opposition.

== Pre-race ==
The "return to power" caused some manufacturers significant problems, as the supply of suitable large-capacity engines was restricted. Only four teams managed to provide true 3-litre cars this early in the season. Regular front runners Ferrari and Lotus were both prepared with new vehicles, as was former World Champion Jack Brabham's eponymous team, fielding Australian Repco-Brabham V8 engines. The fourth team to have a 3L car was Cooper, however, their engine was far from new. The team's first monocoque chassis, the Cooper T81 was fitted with what was in essence Maserati's 1950s engine, which had seen success in the Maserati 250F, bored out to the new capacity limit. BRM's new H16 engine was also slated to appear, but reliability problems resulted in Peter Arundell being forced to withdraw his Lotus-BRM prior to qualifying.

== Race Report ==
From the beginning of practice it became apparent that the race would be a straight fight between the Ferrari of John Surtees and Jack Brabham's Brabham. The pair qualified at the head of the field, with Brabham taking pole by only 0.2 of a second. The race went the same way, with Brabham being forced to equal his pole time in order to stay ahead of Surtees's hard-charging Ferrari. Despite qualifying an impressive third, Jochen Rindt's Cooper developed mechanical troubles and dropped him back to fifth by the end of the race. However, the surprise of the field was the sister Cooper of Jo Bonnier - run by Bonnier's Anglo-Suisse Racing Team and painted in Swiss racing red and white - who managed to climb from sixth to take the third place on the podium. It would prove to be Bonnier's last podium finish in a Formula One car, after a prolific career dating back a decade. Close behind Bonnier, Denny Hulme managed to bring an ageing Brabham home in fourth.

== Results ==
Pos.	Driver	Constructor	Time/Ret.	Grid
1	(Australia) Jack Brabham	Brabham-Repco	52:57.6	1
2	(United Kingdom) John Surtees	Ferrari	+ 7.4 s	2
3	(Sweden) Jo Bonnier	Cooper-Maserati	35 laps	6
4	(New Zealand) Denny Hulme	Brabham-Climax	35 laps	5
5	(Austria) Jochen Rindt	Cooper-Maserati	34 laps	3
6	(United Kingdom) John Taylor	Brabham-BRM	33 laps	10
7	(United Kingdom) Bob Anderson	Brabham-Climax	32 laps	9
8	(Australia) Paul Hawkins	Lotus-Climax	31 laps	13
9	(United Kingdom) Vic Wilson	BRM	24 laps	11
Ret	(Switzerland) Jo Siffert	Cooper-Maserati	ret	14*
Ret	(United States) Richie Ginther	Cooper-Maserati	overheating	8
Ret	(United Kingdom) Mike Spence	Lotus-BRM	engine	4
DNS	(France) Guy Ligier	Cooper-Maserati		(12)

* Qualified 7th, but started from the back of the grid in replacement car.

Previous race: 1966 Syracuse Grand Prix	Formula One non-championship races 1966 season	Next race: 1966 International Gold Cup
Previous race: 1965 BRDC International Trophy	BRDC International Trophy	Next race: 1967 BRDC International Trophy
