= 1966 Formula One season =

20th season of FIA Formula One motor racing

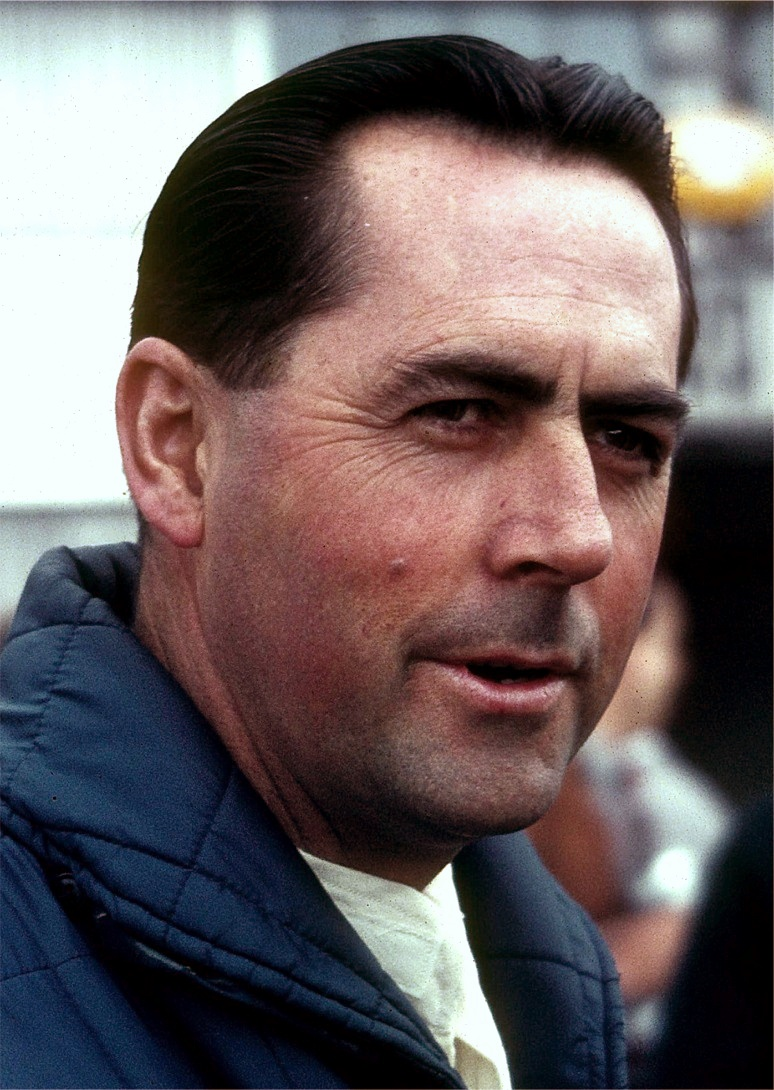
Jack Brabham won his third and final championship driving for his own team.

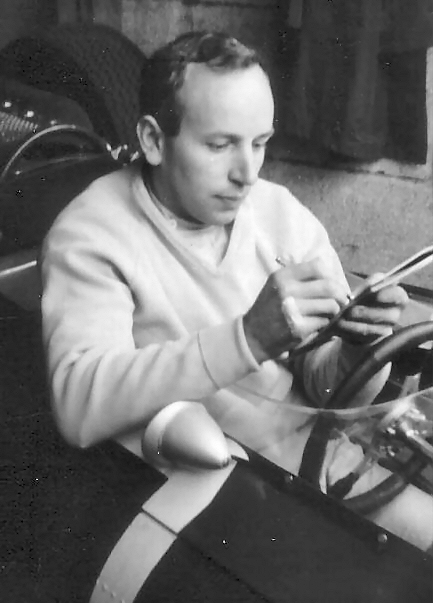
1964 Champion John Surtees finished as runner-up in the World Drivers' Championship.

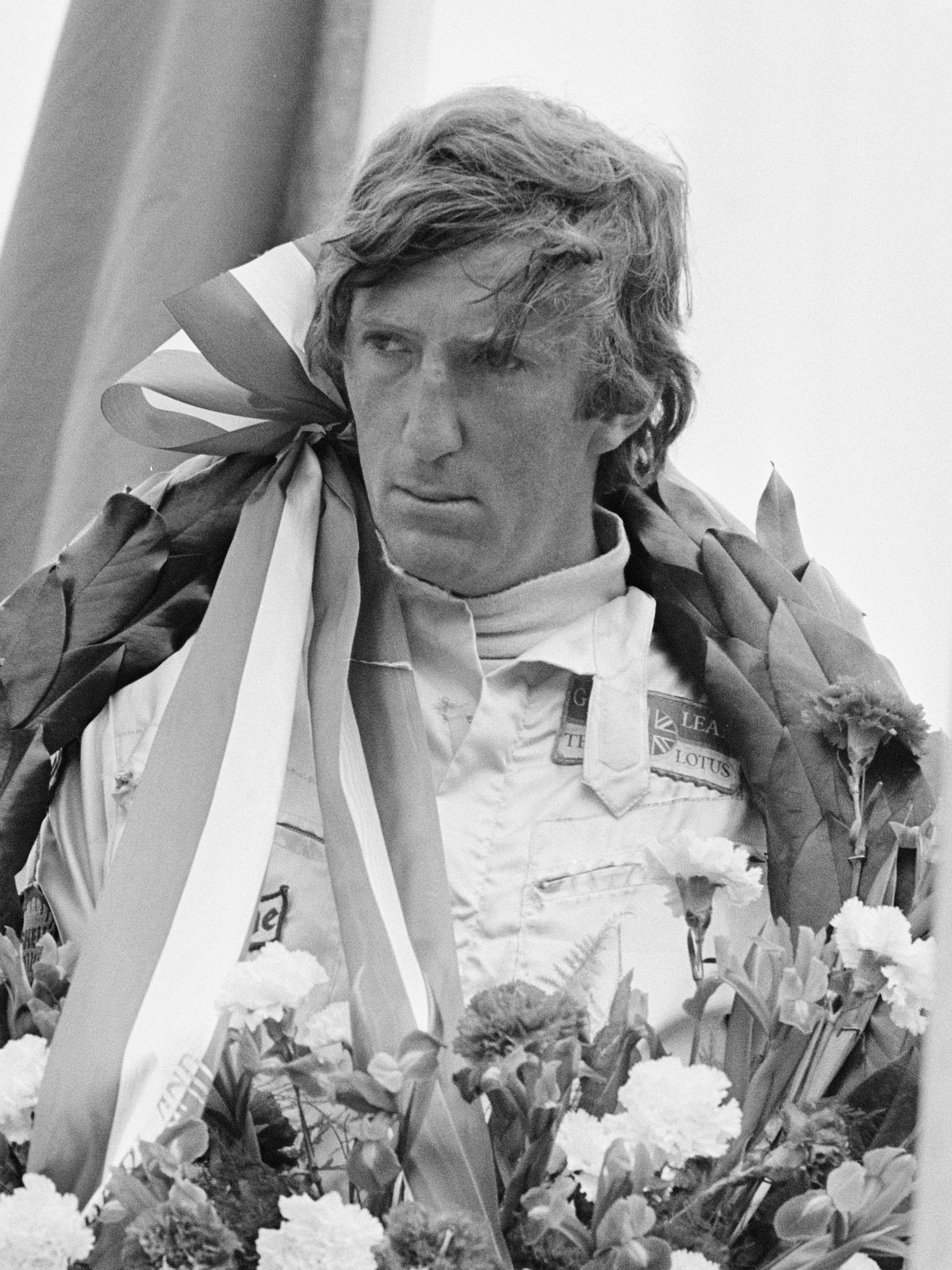
Jochen Rindt finished third in the World Drivers' Championship.

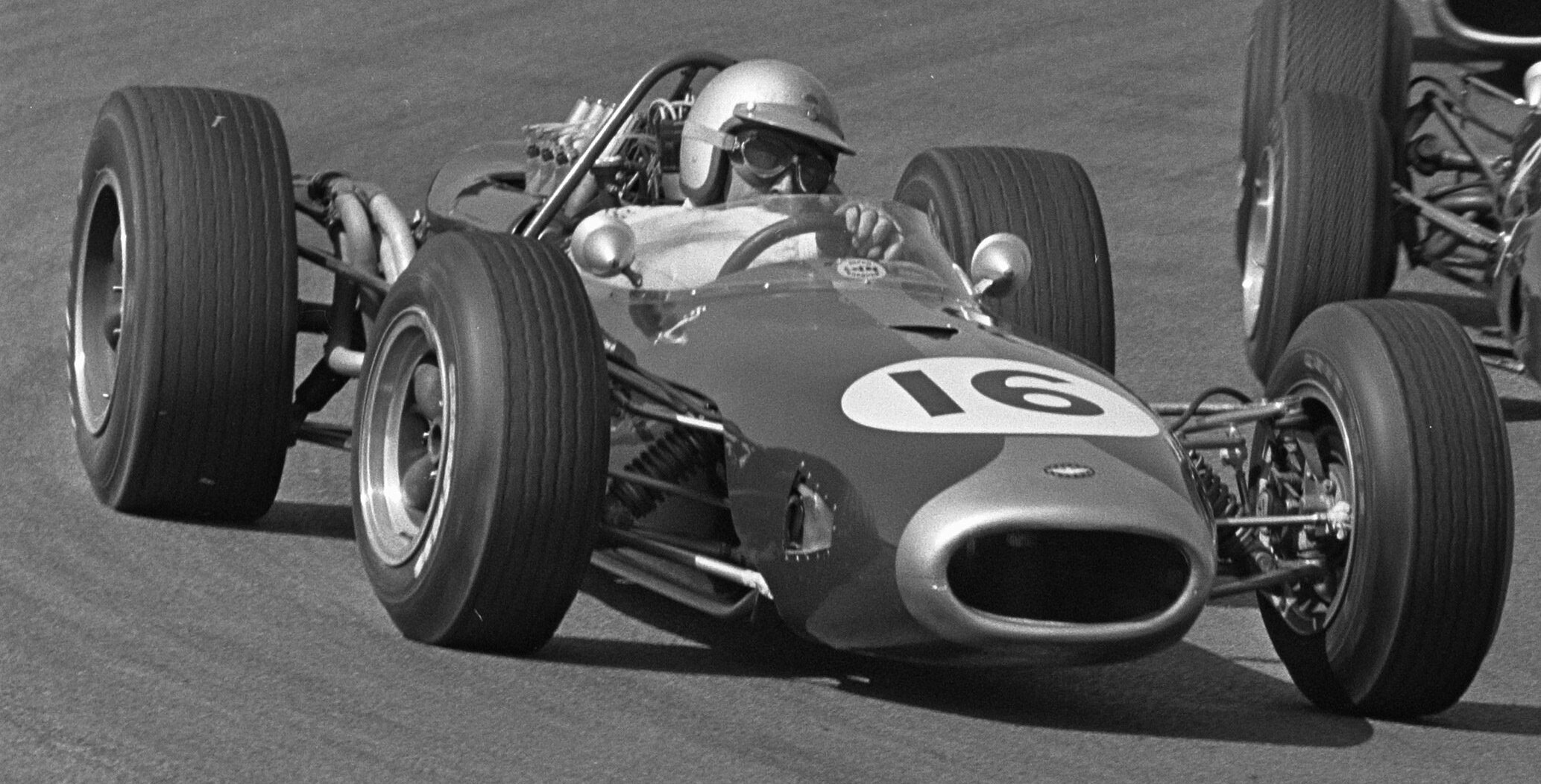
Brabham-Repco won the International Cup for F1 Manufacturers with the Brabham BT19 & BT20.

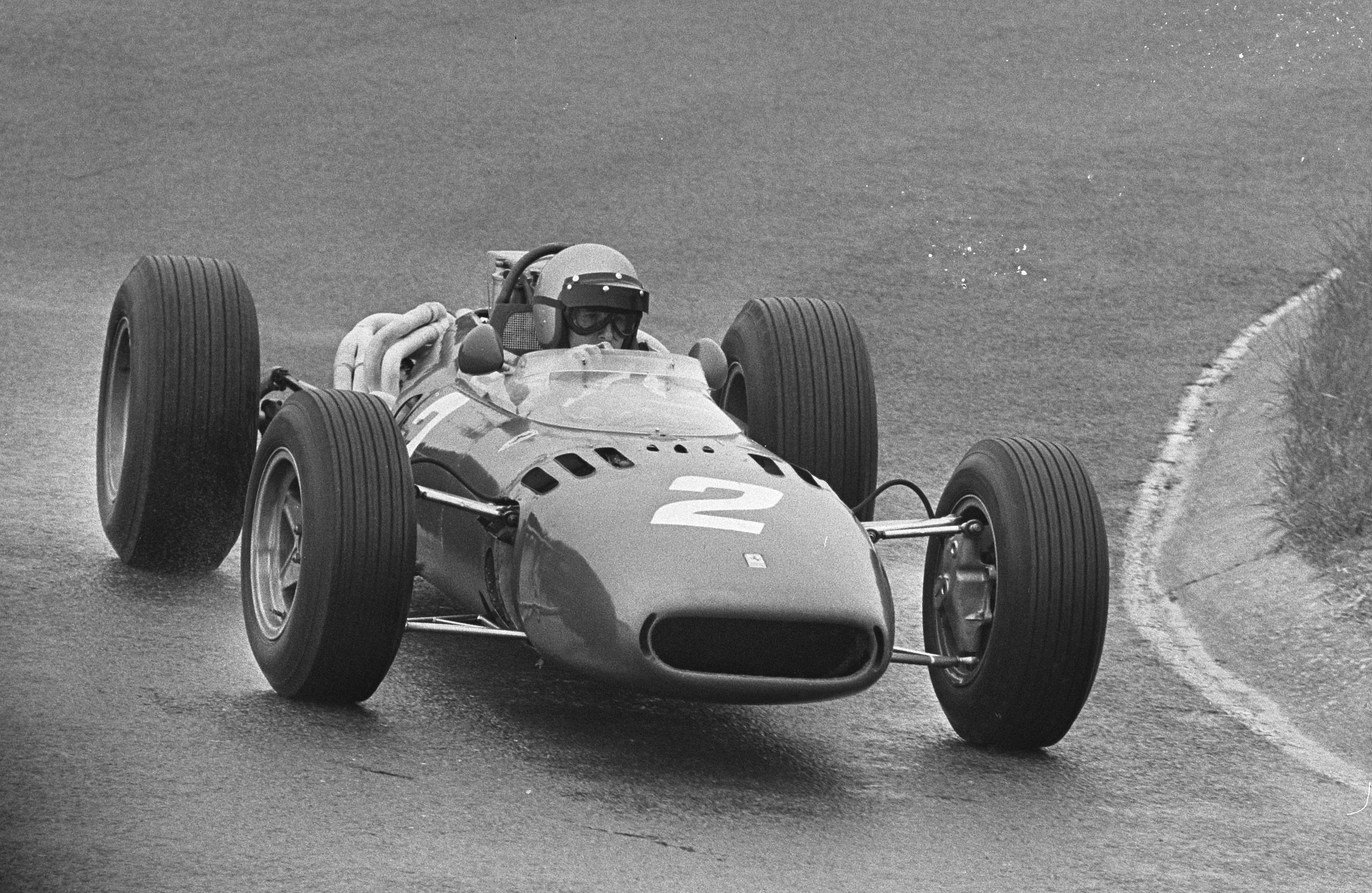
Ferrari finished runner-up with the Ferrari 246 & 312/66.

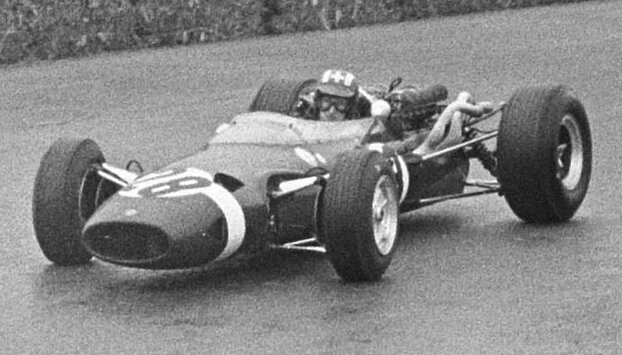
Cooper-Maserati finished third in the International Cup for F1 Manufacturers with the Cooper T81.

The 1966 Formula One season was the 20th season of FIA Formula One motor racing. It featured the 17th World Championship of Drivers, the 9th International Cup for F1 Manufacturers, and four non-championship races open to Formula One cars. The World Championship was contested over nine races between 22 May and 23 October 1966.

Jack Brabham won the Drivers' Championship in a Brabham-Repco. It was his third and last championship, and first since 1960, setting the record for the largest gap between World Championship wins in the history of the sport at six years but would be broken in 1984 with Niki Lauda taking his third championship seven years after his second. Brabham was also awarded the International Cup for F1 Manufacturers, their first title. As of 2026, 1966 is the only time the World Championship has been won by a driver in a car of his own construction and bearing his own name.

John Taylor collided with Formula Two driver Jacky Ickx during the German Grand Prix. Taylor was badly burned in the accident and succumbed to his injuries four weeks later.

The season saw "the return to power", with the FIA doubling the maximum allowed engine displacement from 1.5 to 3 litres.

== Championship teams and drivers ==
The following teams and drivers competed in the 1966 FIA World Championship.

Entrant	Constructor	Chassis	Engine	Tyre	Driver	Rounds
(United Kingdom) Bruce McLaren Motor Racing	McLaren-Ford	M2B	Ford 406 3.0 V8	F	(New Zealand) Bruce McLaren	1, 8–9
(United Kingdom) Bruce McLaren Motor Racing	McLaren-Serenissima	M2B	Serenissima M166 3.0 V8	F	(New Zealand) Bruce McLaren	2, 4–5
(United Kingdom) Team Lotus	Lotus-Climax	33	Climax FWMV 2.0 V8	F	(United Kingdom) Jim Clark	1–6
(United Kingdom) Team Lotus	Lotus-Climax	33	Climax FWMV 2.0 V8	F	(Italy) Geki	7
(United Kingdom) Team Lotus	Lotus-Climax	33	Climax FWMV 2.0 V8	F	(United Kingdom) Peter Arundell	8
(United Kingdom) Team Lotus	Lotus-Climax	33	Climax FWMV 2.0 V8	F	(Mexico) Pedro Rodríguez	3, 9
(United Kingdom) Team Lotus	Lotus-BRM	43; 33	BRM P75 3.0 H16; BRM P60 2.0 V8	F	(Mexico) Pedro Rodríguez	8
(United Kingdom) Team Lotus	Lotus-BRM	43; 33	BRM P75 3.0 H16; BRM P60 2.0 V8	F	(United Kingdom) Peter Arundell	2–7, 9
(United Kingdom) Team Lotus	Lotus-BRM	43; 33	BRM P75 3.0 H16; BRM P60 2.0 V8	F	(United Kingdom) Jim Clark	7–9
(United Kingdom) Team Lotus	Lotus-Ford	44	Ford Cosworth SCA 1.0 L4	D	(West Germany) Gerhard Mitter	6
(United Kingdom) Team Lotus	Lotus-Ford	44	Ford Cosworth SCA 1.0 L4	D	(Mexico) Pedro Rodríguez	6
(United Kingdom) Team Lotus	Lotus-Ford	44	Ford Cosworth SCA 1.0 L4	D	(United Kingdom) Piers Courage	6
(United Kingdom) Reg Parnell Racing	Lotus-BRM	33	BRM P60 2.0 V8	F	(United Kingdom) Mike Spence	All
(United Kingdom) Reg Parnell Racing	Ferrari	246	Ferrari 228 2.4 V6	F	(Italy) Giancarlo Baghetti	7
(United Kingdom) Brabham Racing Organisation	Brabham-Repco	BT19; BT20	Repco 620 3.0 V8	G	(Australia) Jack Brabham	All
(United Kingdom) Brabham Racing Organisation	Brabham-Repco	BT19; BT20	Repco 620 3.0 V8	G	(New Zealand) Denny Hulme	3–9
(United Kingdom) Brabham Racing Organisation	Brabham-Climax	BT22	Climax FPF 2.8 L4	G	(New Zealand) Denny Hulme	1–2
(United Kingdom) Brabham Racing Organisation	Brabham-Climax	BT22	Climax FPF 2.8 L4	G	(United Kingdom) Chris Irwin	4
(United Kingdom) Cooper Car Company	Cooper-Maserati	T81	Maserati 9/F1 3.0 V12	D	(United States) Richie Ginther	1–2
(United Kingdom) Cooper Car Company	Cooper-Maserati	T81	Maserati 9/F1 3.0 V12	D	(Austria) Jochen Rindt	All
(United Kingdom) Cooper Car Company	Cooper-Maserati	T81	Maserati 9/F1 3.0 V12	D	(New Zealand) Chris Amon	3
(United Kingdom) Cooper Car Company	Cooper-Maserati	T81	Maserati 9/F1 3.0 V12	D	(United Kingdom) John Surtees	3–9
(United Kingdom) Cooper Car Company	Cooper-Maserati	T81	Maserati 9/F1 3.0 V12	D	(Mexico) Moisés Solana	9
(United Kingdom) Owen Racing Organisation	BRM	P261; P83	BRM P60 2.0 V8; BRM P75 3.0 H16	D	(United Kingdom) Graham Hill	All
(United Kingdom) Owen Racing Organisation	BRM	P261; P83	BRM P60 2.0 V8; BRM P75 3.0 H16	D	(United Kingdom) Jackie Stewart	1–2, 4–9
(United Kingdom) R.R.C. Walker Racing Team	Brabham-BRM	BT11	BRM P60 2.0 V8	D	(Switzerland) Jo Siffert	1
(United Kingdom) R.R.C. Walker Racing Team	Cooper-Maserati	T81	Maserati 9/F1 3.0 V12	D	(Switzerland) Jo Siffert	2–5, 7–9
(United Kingdom) DW Racing Enterprises	Brabham-Climax	BT11	Climax FPF 2.8 L4	F	(United Kingdom) Bob Anderson	1, 3–7
(Italy) Scuderia Ferrari SpA SEFAC	Ferrari	246; 312/66	Ferrari 228 2.4 V6; Ferrari 218 3.0 V12	F D	(Italy) Lorenzo Bandini	1–3, 5–8
(Italy) Scuderia Ferrari SpA SEFAC	Ferrari	246; 312/66	Ferrari 228 2.4 V6; Ferrari 218 3.0 V12	F D	(United Kingdom) John Surtees	1–2
(Italy) Scuderia Ferrari SpA SEFAC	Ferrari	246; 312/66	Ferrari 228 2.4 V6; Ferrari 218 3.0 V12	F D	(United Kingdom) Mike Parkes	3, 5–7
(Italy) Scuderia Ferrari SpA SEFAC	Ferrari	246; 312/66	Ferrari 228 2.4 V6; Ferrari 218 3.0 V12	F D	(Italy) Ludovico Scarfiotti	6–7
(Switzerland) Anglo-Suisse Racing Team	Cooper-Maserati	T81	Maserati 9/F1 3.0 V12	F	(Sweden) Jo Bonnier	1–2, 5–9
(Switzerland) Anglo-Suisse Racing Team	Brabham-Climax	BT22	Climax FPF 2.8 L4	F	(Sweden) Jo Bonnier	3
(Switzerland) Anglo-Suisse Racing Team	Brabham-Climax	BT7	Climax FWMV 1.5 V8	F	(Sweden) Jo Bonnier	4
(United Kingdom) Team Chamaco Collect	BRM	P261	BRM P60 2.0 V8	G	(United States) Bob Bondurant	1–2, 4, 6–7
(United Kingdom) Team Chamaco Collect	BRM	P261	BRM P60 2.0 V8	G	(United Kingdom) Vic Wilson	2
(United States) Phil Hill	Lotus-Climax	25	Climax FWMV 1.5 V8	F	(United States) Phil Hill	1
(United States) Phil Hill	McLaren-Ford	M3A	Ford 406 3.0 V8	F	(United States) Phil Hill	2
(France) Guy Ligier	Cooper-Maserati	T81	Maserati 9/F1 3.0 V12	D	(France) Guy Ligier	1–6
(United States) Anglo American Racers	Eagle-Climax	Mk1	Climax FPF 2.8 L4	G	(United States) Dan Gurney	2–6, 9
(United States) Anglo American Racers	Eagle-Climax	Mk1	Climax FPF 2.8 L4	G	(United States) Phil Hill	7
(United States) Anglo American Racers	Eagle-Climax	Mk1	Climax FPF 2.8 L4	G	(United States) Bob Bondurant	8
(United States) Anglo American Racers	Eagle-Weslake	Mk1	Weslake 58 3.0 V12	G	(United States) Dan Gurney	7–8
(United States) Anglo American Racers	Eagle-Weslake	Mk1	Weslake 58 3.0 V12	G	(United States) Bob Bondurant	9
(United Kingdom) David Bridges	Brabham-BRM	BT11	BRM P60 2.0 V8	G	(United Kingdom) John Taylor	3–6
(United Kingdom) Shannon Racing Cars	Shannon-Climax	SH1	Climax FPE 3.0 V8	D	(United Kingdom) Trevor Taylor	4
(United Kingdom) J.A. Pearce Engineering Ltd	Cooper-Ferrari	T73	Ferrari Tipo 168 3.0 V12	D	(United Kingdom) Chris Lawrence	4, 6
(West Germany) Caltex Racing Team	Brabham-Ford	BT18	Ford Cosworth SCA 1.0 L4	D	(West Germany) Kurt Ahrens Jr.	6
(United Kingdom) Tyrrell Racing Organisation	Matra-BRM	MS5	BRM P80 1.0 L4	D	(West Germany) Hubert Hahne	6
(United Kingdom) Tyrrell Racing Organisation	Matra-Ford	MS5	Ford Cosworth SCA 1.0 L4	D	(Belgium) Jacky Ickx	6
(United Kingdom) Roy Winkelmann Racing	Brabham-Ford	BT18	Ford Cosworth SCA 1.0 L4	D	(West Germany) Hans Herrmann	6
(United Kingdom) Roy Winkelmann Racing	Brabham-Ford	BT18	Ford Cosworth SCA 1.0 L4	D	(United Kingdom) Alan Rees	6
(France) Matra Sports	Matra-Ford	MS5	Ford Cosworth SCA 1.0 L4	D	(France) Jo Schlesser	6
(France) Matra Sports	Matra-Ford	MS5	Ford Cosworth SCA 1.0 L4	D	(France) Jean-Pierre Beltoise	6
(Switzerland) Silvio Moser	Brabham-Ford	BT16	Ford Cosworth SCA 1.0 L4	D	(Switzerland) Silvio Moser	6
(Japan) Honda R & D Company	Honda	RA273	Honda RA273E 3.0 V12	G	(United States) Richie Ginther	7–9
(Japan) Honda R & D Company	Honda	RA273	Honda RA273E 3.0 V12	G	(United States) Ronnie Bucknum	8–9
(New Zealand) Chris Amon Racing	Brabham-BRM	BT11	BRM P60 1.9 V8	D	(New Zealand) Chris Amon	7
(United Kingdom) Bernard White Racing	BRM	P261	BRM P60 1.9 V8	D	(United Kingdom) Innes Ireland	8–9

- Pink background denotes F2 entrants to the German Grand Prix

=== Team and driver changes ===
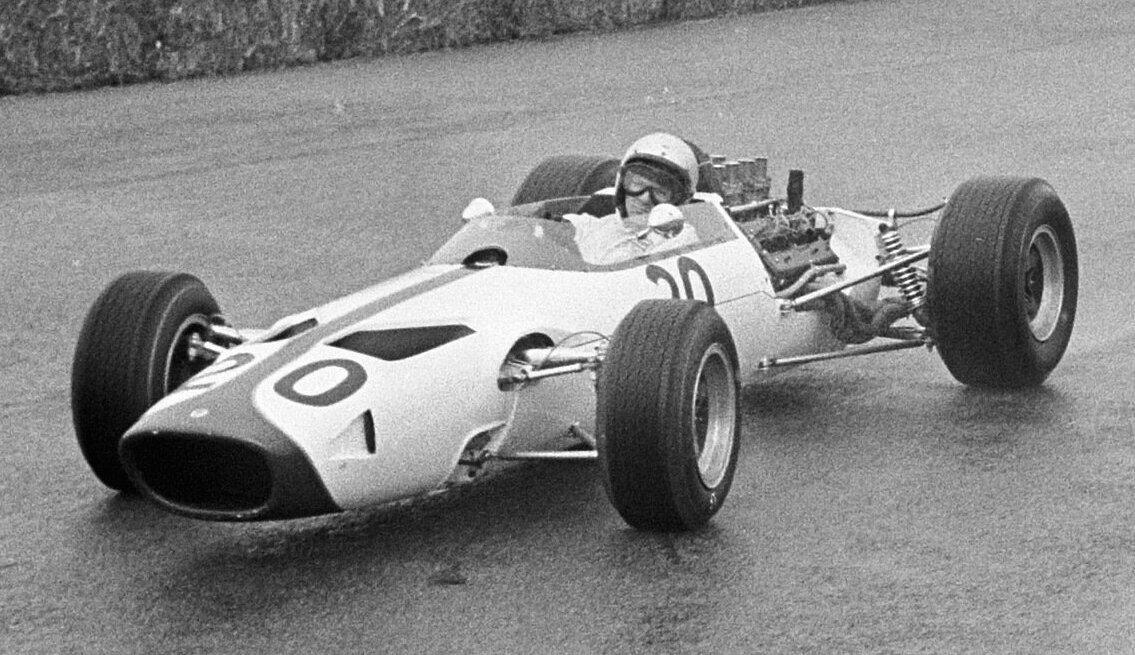
Bruce McLaren (pictured during the 1966 Dutch Grand Prix) entered his own team and chassis.

Dubbed "the return to power", the new formula of 3 litre naturally-aspirated engines was met with enthusiasm. Not all projects were finished in time for the start of the season, however. Following the corporate takeover by Jaguar Cars in 1963, Coventry Climax was forced to get out of racing engine business at the end of 1965 season, despite winning their latest championship in 1965, so most British teams had to find new contracts:

- Brabham partnered with Australian engineering company Repco. Their 3-litre V8 was ready in time.
- Cooper worked with Maserati to receive an updated version of their 1957 engines.
- Lotus had put their hope in a new Climax H16 engine designed by Coventry Climax, but Climax was forced to abandon its development and the engine was never released. So they began the season with a hastily prepared and uncompetitive 2 litre version of Climax FWMV V8. (The team would return to their winning form after a switch to Cosworth DFV engines for 1967.) Peter Arundell was back at Lotus, having recovered from his crash during the 1964 season. Mike Spence, who had replaced him in 1965, was signed by the private Reg Parnell Racing team.

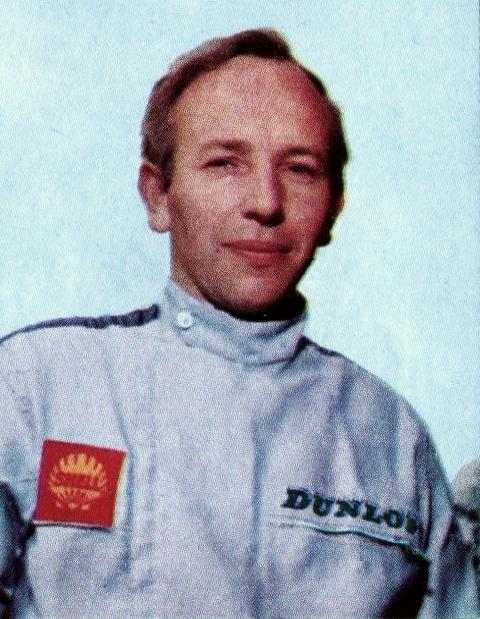
John Surtees left the Ferrari team in disagreement with the management, which severely hampered his championship fight.

Two teams made their debut this year:

- Bruce McLaren had left Cooper to set up his own team. He entered the McLaren M2B, designed by Robin Herd. During the season, McLaren trialled a Ford V8 and a Serenissima V8, switching around multiple times but not finding the right recipe.
- Dan Gurney departed from Brabham to also enter his own team. He had worked with famous car designer Carroll Shelby since 1962 to set up All American Racers. They built an F1 chassis, dubbed the 'Eagle Mk1', and Gurney drove the car himself. The chassis was delayed until the second race of the season and the new Weslake 3 litre V12 was only ready with three races left. They used 2.75L Climax FPF four cylinder until then.

==== Mid-season changes ====
- Honda missed a good part of the races in 1966 but was back on the grid with a new 3 litre V12 engine in the Italian Grand Prix. Richie Ginther left Cooper after two races to make his return to the Japanese team.
- 1964 champion John Surtees was not allowed by Ferrari operations manager Eugenio Dragoni to enter the 1966 24 Hours of Le Mans. Fiat chairman Gianni Agnelli favoured his nephew Ludovico Scarfiotti. When CEO Enzo Ferrari also did not support Surtees, the Brit left the team, thereby also abandoning his F1 drive. Mike Parkes and Scarfiotti, who both did drive the Le Mans race, were promoted to the F1 team, while Surtees took Ginther's place at Cooper.

== Calendar ==
Round	Grand Prix	Circuit	Date
1	Monaco Grand Prix	Circuit de Monaco, Monte Carlo	22 May
2	Belgian Grand Prix	(Belgium) Circuit de Spa-Francorchamps, Stavelot	12 June
3	French Grand Prix	(France) Reims-Gueux, Gueux	3 July
4	British Grand Prix	(United Kingdom) Brands Hatch, West Kingsdown	16 July
5	Dutch Grand Prix	(Netherlands) Circuit Park Zandvoort, Zandvoort	24 July
6	German Grand Prix	(West Germany) Nürburgring, Nürburg	7 August
7	Italian Grand Prix	(Italy) Autodromo Nazionale di Monza, Monza	4 September
8	United States Grand Prix	(United States) Watkins Glen International, New York	2 October
9	Mexican Grand Prix	Magdalena Mixhuca, Mexico City	23 October

=== Calendar changes ===
- The South African Grand Prix at the Prince George Circuit was relegated to non-championship status, because 1.5 litre engines were allowed on the grid while that was no longer the case in the F1 championship.
- The French Grand Prix was moved from the Charade Circuit to Reims-Gueux.
- The British Grand Prix was moved from Silverstone to Brands Hatch, in keeping with the event-sharing arrangement between the two circuits.

== Regulation changes ==
=== Technical regulations ===
- A new engine formula was introduced, heralded as "the return of power". The maximum allowed engine displacement was doubled from 1.5 to 3 litres for naturally-aspirated engines. Compressed engines (using a turbocharger or supercharger) were allowed for the first time since 1960, with a maximum engine displacement of 1.5 litres.
- The minimum weight was raised from 450 kg (990 lb) to 500 kg (1,100 lb).

=== Sporting regulations ===
- Driver completing less than 90% of the race distance would not be classified and did not receive points, even if they finished in the top six.
- The maximum race distance was reduced from 500 km (310 mi) to 400 km (250 mi).

== Championship report ==
=== Rounds 1 to 3 ===
The 1966 season started off with the Monaco Grand Prix. The twisty track seemed for a large part to negate the difference in power between the 3 litre Ferrari engines and the 2 litre BRM and Climax engines (used by Lotuses). 1963 and 1965 champion Jim Clark qualified on pole position in the Lotus-Climax, ahead of 1964 champion John Surtees for Ferrari. On the second row started the two BRMs of Jackie Stewart and 1962 champion Graham Hill. At the start, Clark's car got jammed in first gear and was passed by everyone. Surtees and Stewart created a gap to the rest of the field. Under normal circumstances, the Ferrari would soon leave the BRM behind, but Surtees' rear axle failed and he retired on lap 16. Stewart was out on his own, followed by Jochen Rindt in the Cooper-Maserati and Hill, before Lorenzo Bandini rose up to second place in the Ferrari. Clark was charging back to the front of the field, but spent a lot of time behind Hill. Clark dove through into the first corner to take third place - Rindt had retired with engine failure - but the Lotus's left-rear suspension failed later in the lap and the reigning champion was out of the race. Stewart held on to take his second career win, ahead of Bandini and Hill. Bob Bondurant finished in fourth place to get three BRMs in the points. Behind came three Coopers but none of them were classified and did not receive championship points.

At first, Stewart was setting the pace during practice for the Belgian Grand Prix, but on the high-speed circuit, Surtees qualified on pole in his Ferrari, more than three seconds ahead of Rindt in the Cooper-Maserati. Stewart started third, while Clark could only manage tenth. As the flag was waved, rain was falling at the far end of the track. Stewart and Hill crashed in the Masta Kink, already known as the most dangerous corner, and the Scot got trapped under his car in a pool of leaking fuel for 25 minutes. Both Hill and Bondurant, who had crashed as well, borrowed a spectator's toolkit to free him. Another five cars retired within the first lap of the race, including Clark. Surtees led the race, ahead of Rindt and Bandini, and that became the finishing order as well. Behind them finished 1959 and 1960 champion Jack Brabham and Rindt's teammate Richie Ginther. Two other drivers were still running but were not classified, making it two races in a row that championship points were held back under the new rule. Following his crash, Stewart became a strong advocate of improving driver safety in not only Grand Prix but motor racing in general.

When Surtees was not granted a drive with Ferrari in the 24 Hours of Le Mans, he left the Italian team and, with that, gave up his F1 drive as well. He found a seat at Cooper, where Ginther had left to return to his old team Honda. Bandini qualified on pole for the French Grand Prix, with old teammate Surtees and new teammate Mike Parkes beside him on the first row. At the start, Surtees fell back with fuel pick-up issues, before he retired on lap 5. Brabham got up to second place, the only driver able to follow Bandini's pace. On lap 32, the Australian inherited the lead as the Ferrari's throttle cable broke. The Italian took a piece of string from a straw bale lining the track and tied it to his throttle, operating it by hand and actually nursing his car back to the pits, but finished out of the points. Brabham won the race, ahead of Parkes in his first race and Brabham's teammate Denny Hulme.

In the Drivers' Championship, Jack Brabham (Brabham-Repco) took the lead with 12 points, ahead of Lorenzo Bandini (Ferrari, 10 points), followed by Surtees, Stewart and Rindt (all 9 points). In the Manufacturers' Championship, Ferrari had the lead with 21 points, ahead of Brabham (12) and BRM and Cooper (both 9).

=== Rounds 4 to 6 ===
The British Grand Prix at Brands Hatch saw the Brabham duo of Jack Brabham and Denny Hulme qualify at the front, ahead of Dan Gurney in the Eagle, Graham Hill for BRM and Jim Clark for Lotus. Next came John Surtees in the Cooper, to make it five different constructors in the top six. At the start, it was Brabham and Hill who led away, until it started raining and Jochen Rindt pitted for rain tyres. Rindt got up to second place, pressing Brabham for the lead, while Surtees was third. As the rain dried, however, Rindt fell back and Surtees retired, leaving Brabham and Hulme to finish first and second. Behind them came Hill, Clark and Rindt.

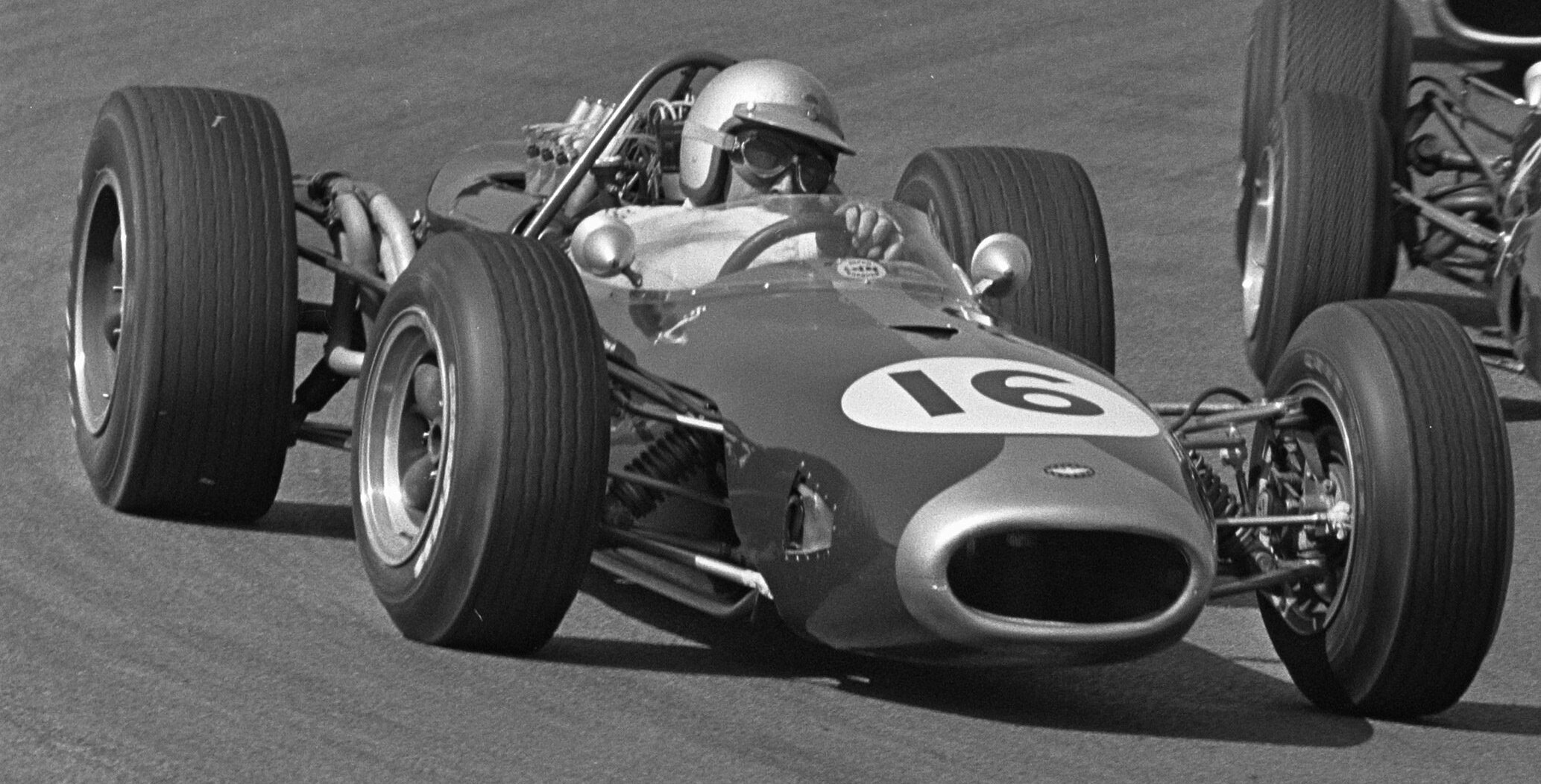
Jack Brabham started on pole position for the Dutch Grand Prix.

Brabham and Hulme again qualified first and second for the Dutch Grand Prix, ahead of Clark, still driving a 2 litre Climax-powered Lotus. Hulme's engine went wrong on lap 17, eventually retiring on lap 37, and leaving Brabham vulnerable to Clark's offense. While lapping some backmarkers, the Brit passed the Australian and pulled out a substantial lead. At half-distance, Graham Hill was the only driver not lapped by Clark and Brabham, but then, a shock absorber on the Lotus's crankshaft broke and punched a hole in the water pump, leading to his engine coolant to leak away. This forced a pit stop and brought him down to third place. Brabham won his third race in a row, ahead of Hill.

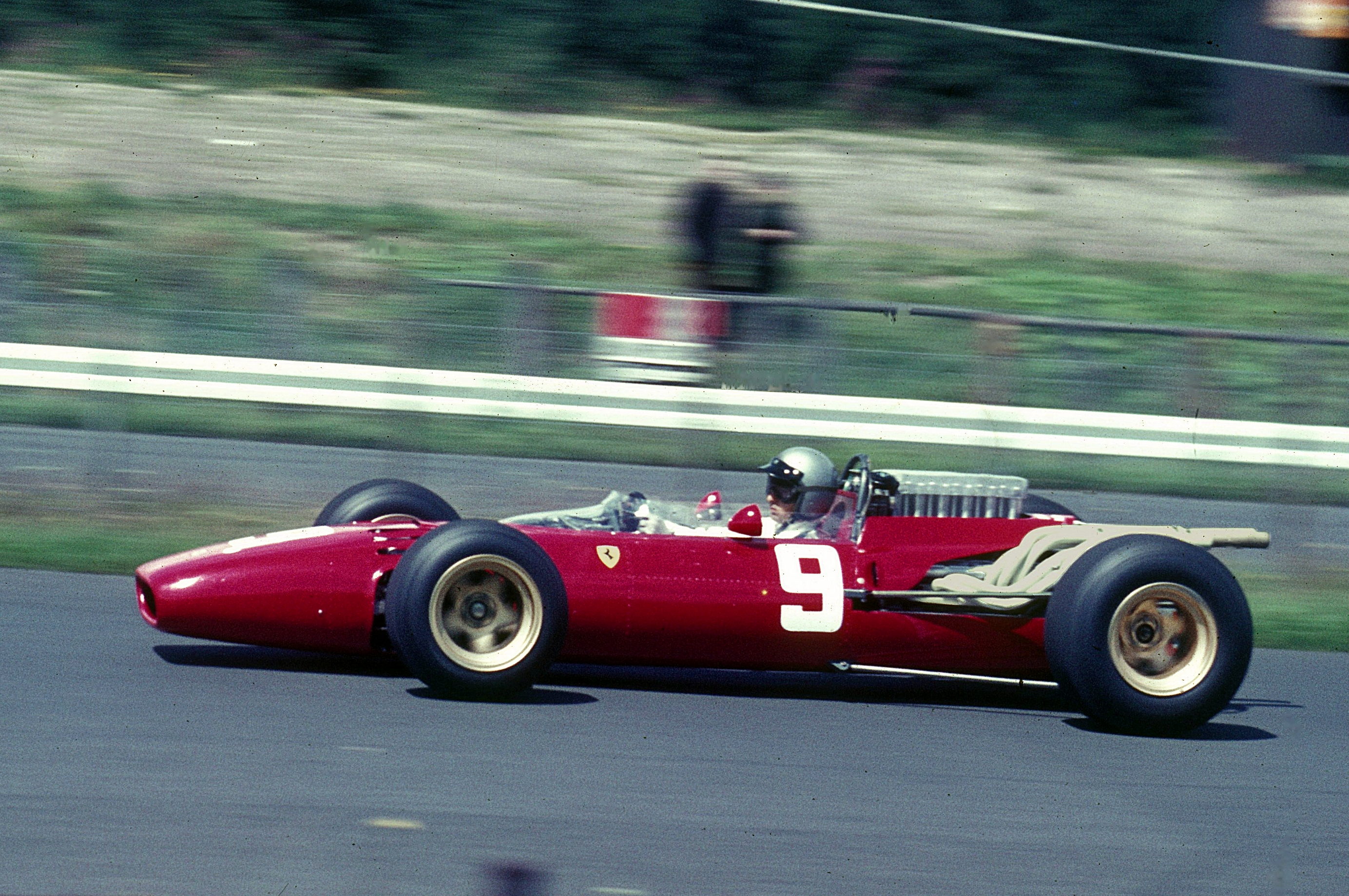
Lorenzo Bandini (Ferrari) during the German Grand Prix

The German Grand Prix was run at the Nürburgring Nordschleife. In fear of a dull race with not enough entries, the FIA allowed Formula Two entries to race simultaneously. They would not be eligible for F1 championship points. The lighter 2 litre cars topped the timings in qualifying, with Clark, Surtees and Stewart occupying the front row. But at the start, the more powerful 3 litre cars got away better: Surtees held the lead, but Brabham and Lorenzo Bandini were his nearest rivals. John Taylor spun off in the rain that had started falling. He got trapped in a burning wreck but was rescued by F2 driver Jacky Ickx. At the end of the first lap, Brabham had taken the lead, ahead of Surtees, Rindt and Clark. The latter crashed out of the race on lap 11, while the podium places remained unchanged.

After winning four consecutive races, Jack Brabham (Brabham) had a sizeable lead in the Drivers' Championship with 39 points, ahead of Graham Hill (BRM, 17 points) and John Surtees and Jochen Rindt (teammates at Cooper, both on 15 points). In the Manufacturers' Championship, Brabham led with 39 points, ahead of Ferrari (23) and BRM (22).

=== Rounds 7 to 9 ===
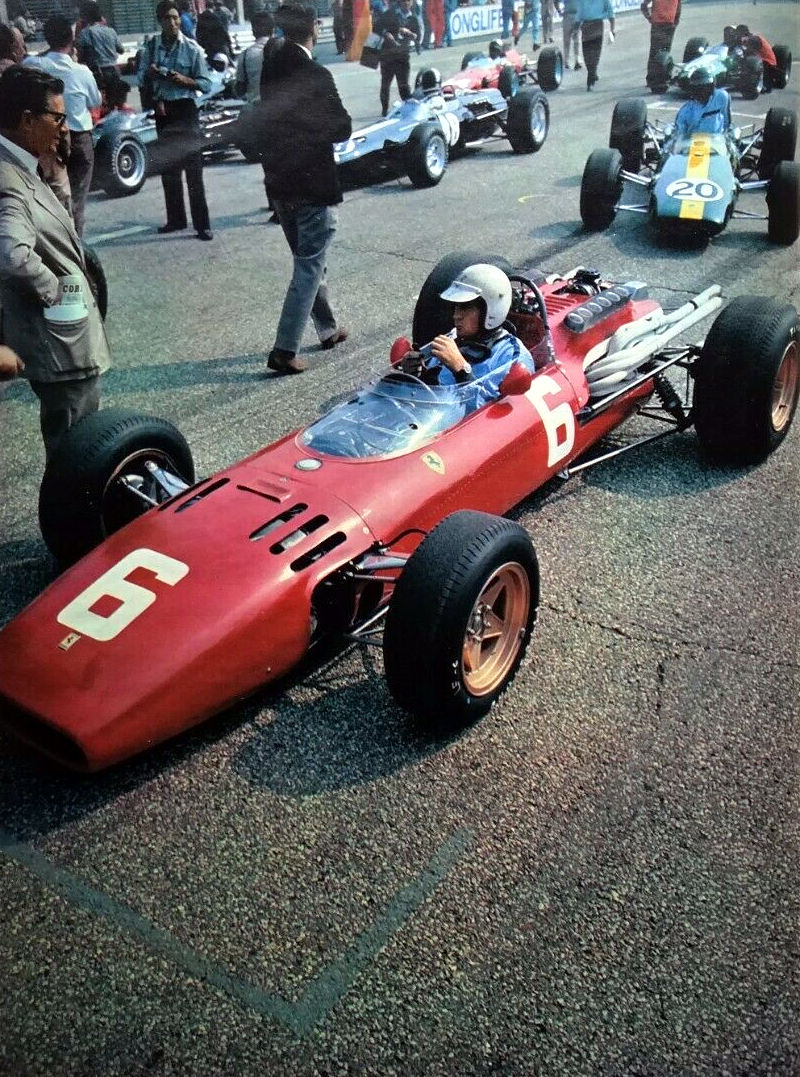
Ludovico Scarfiotti won the Italian Grand Prix for Ferrari.

The teams that had had to make due with limited power until now, could finally take delivery of new 3 litre engines for the Italian Grand Prix: BRM introduced H16 engines for the works team and their customer Team Lotus, the Eagle was powered by the new Weslake V12, and Honda were on the grid for the first time this year with their own V12. Much to the joy of the tifosi, Ferrari teammates Mike Parkes and Ludovico Scarfiotti qualified at the front, ahead of Jim Clark (Lotus), John Surtees (Cooper) and Lorenzo Bandini (Ferrari). Championship leader Jack Brabham started in sixth but felt not much pressure, as Surtees had to win all three remaining races to stop the Australian from claiming the title. Scarfiotti took the lead at the start but was down to seventh at the end of the first lap. His teammate Bandini replaced him at the front. Brabham went by on lap 4 but then retired with an oil leak. Successively, Surtees, Bandini and Clark retired as well, giving the lead back to Scarfiotti, ahead of Parkes and Denny Hulme (Brabham). Jochen Rindt's front tyre deflated coming out of the last corner, the Austrian crossing the finish line while spinning and eventually ending up in the grass. With Surtees' retirement, Brabham had clinched the Drivers' Championship of 1966.

As per usual, the championship ended overseas, firstly with the United States Grand Prix. Freshly crowned champion Brabham qualified on pole with last year's champion Clark next to him. Bandini started third but quickly took the lead, before Brabham went back through on lap 10. Bandini later repassed the Australian but then retired with an engine failure. Halfway through the race, Brabham retired as well. Clark had been left behind by the leading duo but inherited the race win. Rindt ran out of fuel and slowed down. He did finish the race, but his last lap took so long that it was forfeited, putting him a lap behind but still second in the classification, as Surtees in third was even further behind.

The last round of the season, the Mexican Grand Prix, saw Surtees back on pole, for the first time in a Cooper, ahead of Clark and Ginther. The Honda driver took the lead at the start, leading fifth-starting Rindt and fourth-starting Brabham. Surtees fell down to fifth but had charged back to first at the half-way point. He won the race, seven seconds ahead of Brabham and at least a lap ahead of Hulme and the rest of the field.

Jack Brabham had won the Drivers' Championship with 42 points, ahead of John Surtees (28) and Jochen Rindt (22). It was Brabham's third Drivers' Championship (following wins in 1959 and 1960), moving him into the second place in the record standings, behind five-time champion Juan Manuel Fangio. He became the first and, so far, only driver to win the championship in a car carrying his own name. The Brabham team also scored 42 points in the Manufacturers' Champions and won the title, ahead of Ferrari (31 points) and Cooper (30 points).

== Results and standings ==
=== Grands Prix ===
Round	Grand Prix	Pole position	Fastest lap	Winning driver	Winning constructor	Tyre	Report
1	Monaco Grand Prix	(United Kingdom) Jim Clark	(Italy) Lorenzo Bandini	(United Kingdom) Jackie Stewart	(United Kingdom) BRM	D	Report
2	(Belgium) Belgian Grand Prix	(United Kingdom) John Surtees	(United Kingdom) John Surtees	(United Kingdom) John Surtees	(Italy) Ferrari	D	Report
3	(France) French Grand Prix	(Italy) Lorenzo Bandini	(Italy) Lorenzo Bandini	(Australia) Jack Brabham	(United Kingdom) Brabham-Repco	G	Report
4	(United Kingdom) British Grand Prix	(Australia) Jack Brabham	(Australia) Jack Brabham	(Australia) Jack Brabham	(United Kingdom) Brabham-Repco	G	Report
5	(Netherlands) Dutch Grand Prix	(Australia) Jack Brabham	(New Zealand) Denny Hulme	(Australia) Jack Brabham	(United Kingdom) Brabham-Repco	G	Report
6	(West Germany) German Grand Prix	(United Kingdom) Jim Clark	(United Kingdom) John Surtees	(Australia) Jack Brabham	(United Kingdom) Brabham-Repco	G	Report
7	(Italy) Italian Grand Prix	(United Kingdom) Mike Parkes	(Italy) Ludovico Scarfiotti	(Italy) Ludovico Scarfiotti	(Italy) Ferrari	F	Report
8	United States Grand Prix	(Australia) Jack Brabham	(United Kingdom) John Surtees	(United Kingdom) Jim Clark	(United Kingdom) Lotus-BRM	F	Report
9	(Mexico) Mexican Grand Prix	(United Kingdom) John Surtees	(United States) Richie Ginther	(United Kingdom) John Surtees	(United Kingdom) Cooper-Maserati	D	Report

=== Scoring system ===
Points were awarded to the top six classified finishers. Only the best five results counted towards the championship. Formula 2 cars were not eligible for Championship points.

The International Cup for F1 Manufacturers only counted the points of the highest-finishing driver for each race. Additionally, like the Drivers' Championship, only the best five results counted towards the cup.

Numbers without parentheses are championship points; numbers in parentheses are total points scored. Points were awarded in the following system:

Position	1st	2nd	3rd	4th	5th	6th
Race	9	6	4	3	2	1

=== World Drivers' Championship standings ===
Pos.	Driver	MON (Monaco)	BEL (Belgium)	FRA (France)	GBR (United Kingdom)	NED (Netherlands)	GER (West Germany)	ITA (Italy)	USA (United States)	MEX (Mexico)	Pts. (Note: Only the best 5 results counted towards the championship. Numbers without parentheses are championship points; numbers in parentheses are total points scored.)
1	(Australia) Jack Brabham	Ret	(4)	1	1^{P}^{F}	1^{P}	1	Ret	Ret^{P}	2	42 (45)
2	(United Kingdom) John Surtees	Ret	1^{P}^{F}	Ret	Ret	Ret	2^{F}	Ret	3^{F}	1^{P}	28
3	(Austria) Jochen Rindt	Ret	2	4	(5)	Ret	3	4	2	Ret	22 (24)
4	(New Zealand) Denny Hulme	Ret	Ret	3	2	Ret^{F}	Ret	3	Ret	3	18
5	(United Kingdom) Graham Hill	3	Ret	Ret	3	2	4	Ret	Ret	Ret	17
6	(United Kingdom) Jim Clark	Ret^{P}	Ret	DNS	4	3	Ret^{P}	Ret	1	Ret	16
7	(United Kingdom) Jackie Stewart	1	Ret		Ret	4	5	Ret	Ret	Ret	14
8	(United Kingdom) Mike Parkes			2		Ret	Ret	2^{P}			12
=	(Italy) Lorenzo Bandini	2^{F}	3	NC^{P}^{F}		6	6	Ret	Ret		12
10	(Italy) Ludovico Scarfiotti						Ret	1^{F}			9
11	(United States) Richie Ginther	Ret	5					Ret	Ret	4^{F}	5
12	(United States) Dan Gurney		NC	5	Ret	Ret	7	Ret	Ret	5	4
=	(United Kingdom) Mike Spence	Ret	Ret	Ret	Ret	5	Ret	5	Ret	DNS	4
14	(United States) Bob Bondurant	4	Ret		9		Ret	7	DSQ	Ret	3
=	(Switzerland) Jo Siffert	Ret	Ret	Ret	NC	Ret		Ret	4	Ret	3
=	(New Zealand) Bruce McLaren	Ret	DNS		6	DNS			5	Ret	3
17	(United Kingdom) Peter Arundell		DNS	Ret	Ret	Ret	12	8	6	7	1
=	(Sweden) Jo Bonnier	NC	Ret	NC	Ret	7	Ret	Ret	NC	6	1
=	(United Kingdom) Bob Anderson	Ret		7	NC	Ret	Ret	6			1
=	(United Kingdom) John Taylor			6	8	8	Ret				1
—	(United Kingdom) Chris Irwin				7						0
—	(United States) Ronnie Bucknum								Ret	8	0
—	(New Zealand) Chris Amon			8				DNQ			0
—	(France) Guy Ligier	NC	NC	NC	10	9	DNS				0
—	(Italy) Geki							9			0
—	(United Kingdom) Chris Lawrence				11		Ret				0
—	(Italy) Giancarlo Baghetti							NC			0
—	(Mexico) Pedro Rodríguez			Ret			Ret^{1}		Ret	Ret	0
—	(United Kingdom) Innes Ireland								Ret	Ret	0
—	(United Kingdom) Trevor Taylor				Ret						0
—	(Mexico) Moisés Solana									Ret	0
—	(United States) Phil Hill	DNS	Ret					DNQ			0
—	(United Kingdom) Vic Wilson		DNS								0
Drivers ineligible for Formula One points, because they drove with Formula Two cars
—	(France) Jean-Pierre Beltoise						8				
—	(West Germany) Hubert Hahne						9				
—	(France) Jo Schlesser						10				
—	(West Germany) Hans Herrmann						11				
—	(United Kingdom) Piers Courage						Ret				
—	(United Kingdom) Alan Rees						Ret				
—	(West Germany) Kurt Ahrens Jr.						Ret				
—	(Belgium) Jacky Ickx						Ret				
—	(Switzerland) Silvio Moser						DNS				
—	(West Germany) Gerhard Mitter						DNS				
Pos.	Driver	MON (Monaco)	BEL (Belgium)	FRA (France)	GBR (United Kingdom)	NED (Netherlands)	GER (West Germany)	ITA (Italy)	USA (United States)	MEX (Mexico)	Pts.

Key
Colour	Result
Gold	Winner
Silver	Second place
Bronze	Third place
Green	Other points position
Blue	Other classified position
Blue	Not classified, finished (NC)
Purple	Not classified, retired (Ret)
Red	Did not qualify (DNQ)
Black	Disqualified (DSQ)
White	Did not start (DNS)
White	Race cancelled (C)
Blank	Did not practice (DNP)
Blank	Excluded (EX)
Blank	Did not arrive (DNA)
Blank	Withdrawn (WD)
Blank	Did not enter (empty cell)
Annotation	Meaning
P	Pole position
F	Fastest lap

- ^{1} – Ineligible for Formula One points, because he drove with a Formula Two car.

=== International Cup for F1 Manufacturers standings ===
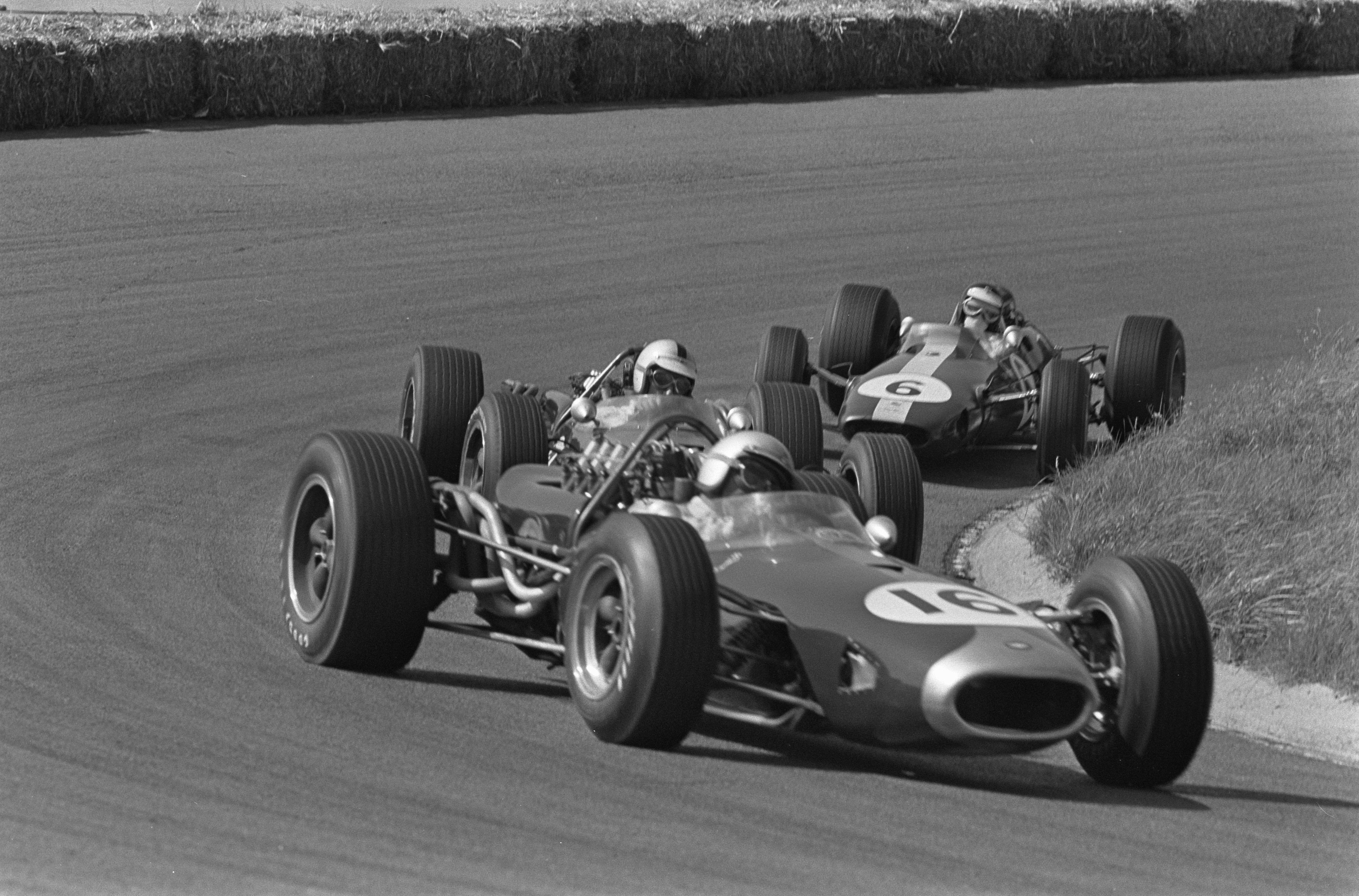
Brabham-Repco won the 1966 International Cup for F1 Manufacturers

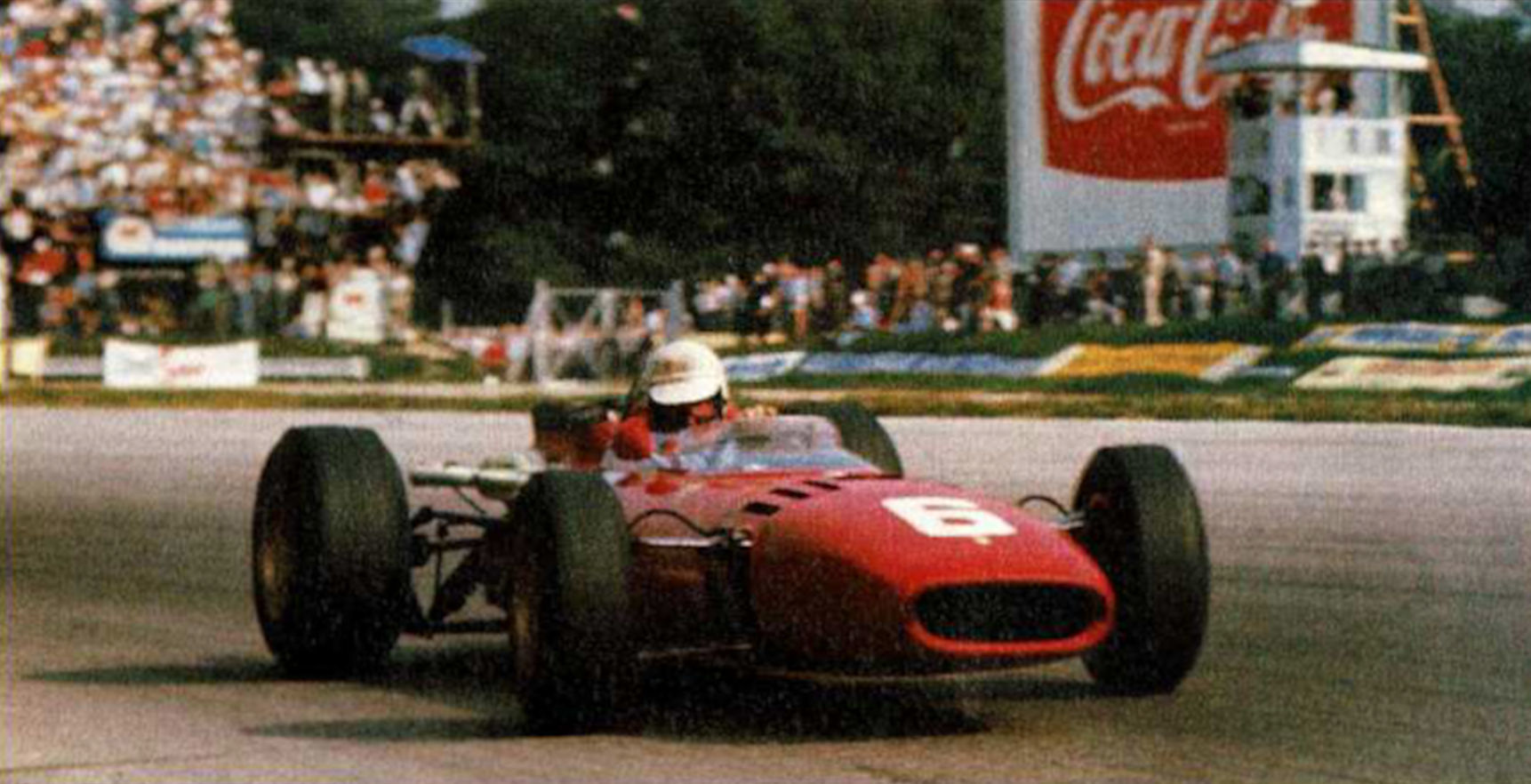
Ferrari placed second in the Manufacturers' title

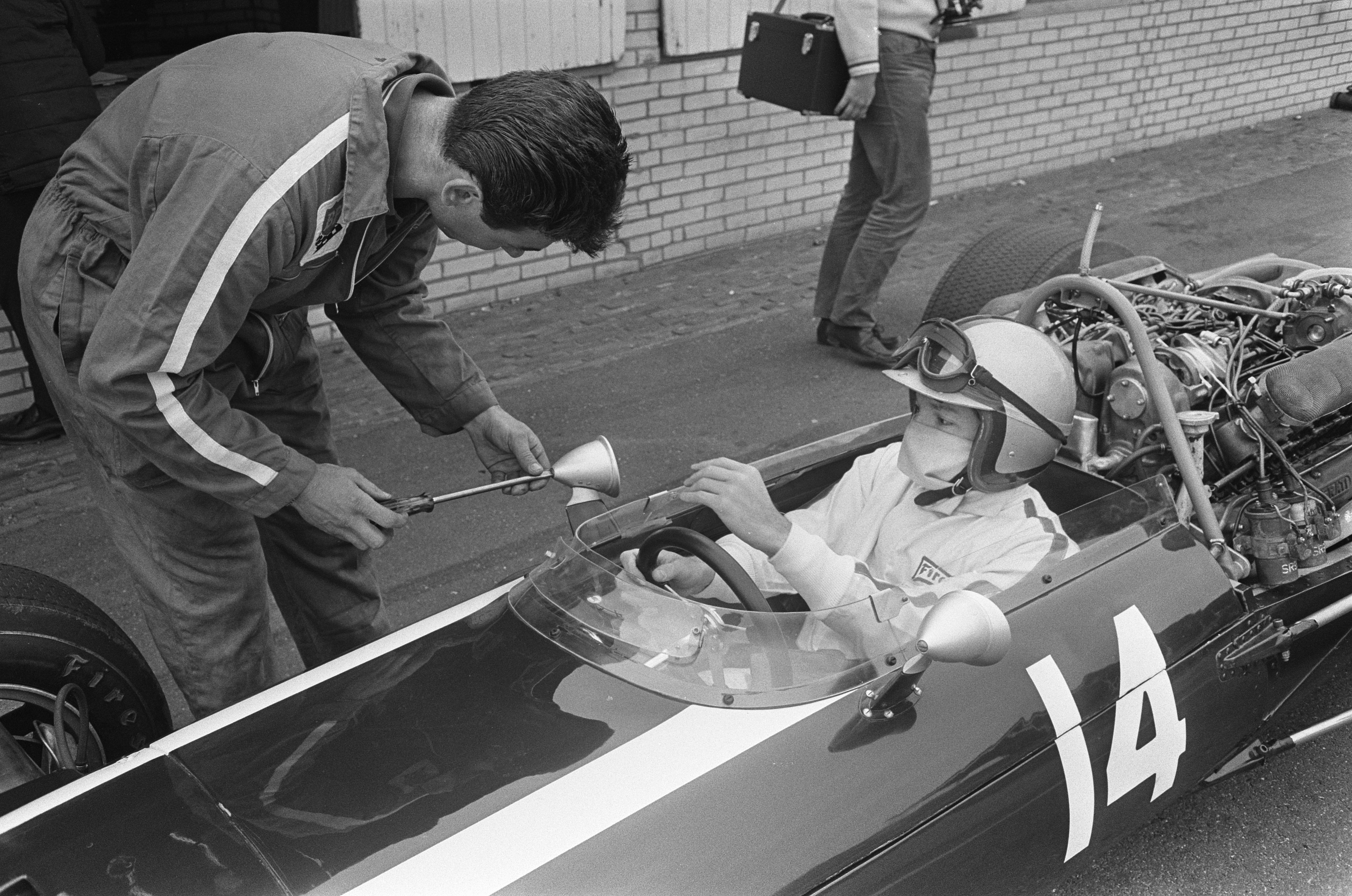
Cooper-Maserati placed third

Pos.	Manufacturer	MON (Monaco)	BEL (Belgium)	FRA (France)	GBR (United Kingdom)	NED (Netherlands)	GER (West Germany)	ITA (Italy)	USA (United States)	MEX (Mexico)	Pts.
1	(United Kingdom) Brabham-Repco	Ret	(4)	1	1	1	1	(3)	Ret	2	42 (49)
2	(Italy) Ferrari	2	1	2		6	(6)	1	Ret		31 (32)
3	(United Kingdom) Cooper-Maserati	NC	2	4	(5)	7	2	(4)	2	1	30 (35)
4	(United Kingdom) BRM	1	Ret	Ret	3	2	4	7	Ret	Ret	22
5	(United Kingdom) Lotus-BRM	Ret	Ret	Ret	Ret	5	12	5	1	7	13
6	(United Kingdom) Lotus-Climax	Ret	Ret	Ret	4	3	Ret	9	6	Ret	8
7	(United States) Eagle-Climax		NC	5	Ret	Ret	7	DNQ	DSQ	5	4
8	(Japan) Honda							Ret	NC	4	3
9	(United Kingdom) McLaren-Ford	Ret	Ret						5	Ret	2
10	(United Kingdom) Brabham-Climax	Ret	Ret	7	7	Ret	Ret	6			1
=	(United Kingdom) Brabham-BRM	Ret		6	8	8	Ret	DNQ			1
=	(United Kingdom) McLaren-Serenissima		DNS		6	DNS					1
—	(United Kingdom) Cooper-Ferrari				11		Ret				0
—	(United States) Eagle-Weslake							Ret	Ret	Ret	0
—	(United Kingdom) Shannon-Climax				Ret						0
Pos.	Manufacturer	MON (Monaco)	BEL (Belgium)	FRA (France)	GBR (United Kingdom)	NED (Netherlands)	GER (West Germany)	ITA (Italy)	USA (United States)	MEX (Mexico)	Pts.

- Bold results counted to championship totals.

== Non-championship races ==
Four other Formula One races were held in 1966, which did not count towards the World Championship.

Race name	Circuit	Date	Winning driver	Constructor	Report
(South Africa) South African Grand Prix	Prince George	1 January	(United Kingdom) Mike Spence	(United Kingdom) Lotus-Climax	Report
(Italy) Gran Premio di Siracusa	Syracuse	1 May	(United Kingdom) John Surtees	(Italy) Ferrari	Report
(United Kingdom) BRDC International Trophy	Silverstone	14 May	(Australia) Jack Brabham	(United Kingdom) Brabham-Repco	Report
(United Kingdom) International Gold Cup	Oulton Park	17 September	(Australia) Jack Brabham	(United Kingdom) Brabham-Repco	Report

== Grand Prix ==
The film Grand Prix is a fictionalized version of the 1966 season, which includes footage of the actual races edited together with footage of actors in staged racing scenes.
