= 1966 Belgian Grand Prix =

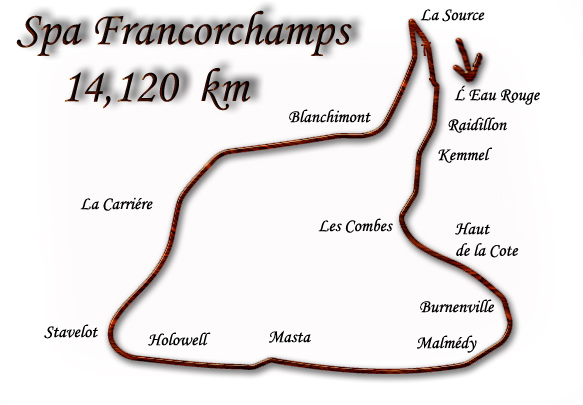

Race details
- Date: 12 June 1966
- Official name: XXVI Grand Prix de Belgique
- Location: Spa-Francorchamps, Francorchamps, Belgium
- Course: Permanent racing circuit
- Course length: 14.120 km (8.770 miles)
- Distance: 28 laps, 395.36 km (245.56 miles)
- Weather: Overcast and wet

Pole position
Driver	(United Kingdom) John Surtees	Ferrari
- Time: 3:38:0

Fastest lap
Driver	(United Kingdom) John Surtees	Ferrari
- Time: 4:18:7

Podium
First	(United Kingdom) John Surtees	Ferrari
Second	(Austria) Jochen Rindt	Cooper-Maserati
Third	(Italy) Lorenzo Bandini	Ferrari

The 1966 Belgian Grand Prix was a Formula One motor race held at Spa-Francorchamps on 12 June 1966. It was race 2 of 9 in both the 1966 World Championship of Drivers and the 1966 International Cup for Formula One Manufacturers. The race was the 26th Belgian Grand Prix and was held over 28 laps of the 14.1-kilometre circuit for a race distance of 395 kilometres.

The race was won by British driver and 1964 world champion, John Surtees, driving a Ferrari 312 in a race that saw the field decimated by weather in the early laps. It was Surtees' fourth Grand Prix victory and his first since the 1964 Italian Grand Prix. Surtees won by 42 seconds over Austrian driver Jochen Rindt driving a Cooper T81, Rindt achieving his first podium finish and the first for the new Cooper-Maserati combination as the works Cooper Car Company team looked to the three-litre Maserati V12 sports car engine for the new regulations. Surtees' Italian teammate Lorenzo Bandini finished third in his Ferrari 246.

With a pair of podiums, Bandini took the lead in the championship by a point over the two race winners, Surtees and Jackie Stewart.

== Race summary ==
The race distance was shortened from the previous year, from 32 to 28 laps. More than half the field crashed out on the first lap due to a heavy rainstorm and only seven runners remained by the start of the second lap. Four drivers went off and crashed at the sweeping Burnenville corner, where the heavy wall of rain was. Jo Bonnier crashed with his Cooper T81 coming to rest balancing on a parapet, the front half car in the air. Jackie Stewart's BRM P261 crashed into a telephone pole and then landed in a ditch at Masta Kink, leading to him being stuck upside down in his BRM, halfway up to his waist in fuel, for 25 minutes. Graham Hill and Bob Bondurant, both of whom had gone off near Stewart, managed to rescue him with a spectator's toolkit. Jack Brabham slid his Brabham BT19 coming out of the Masta Kink at 135 mph, but regained control of the car and rejoined the race. There was so much water on the track that it got into and flooded the Climax engine in Jim Clark's Lotus 33, putting him out on the first lap too. The entire first lap was run under green flags.

The race was filmed for the motion picture Grand Prix. The eight-minute segment of the 1966 film uses a combination of live footage and mocked-up racing scenes. The live footage shows Surtees, Bonnier, Bandini, Ligier, Clark and Gurney in action. Surtees doubles in the scene for the fictional Jean-Pierre Sarti while Bandini doubles for the fictional Nino Barlini. The film is careful not to pick up Jackie Stewart in action as he doubles for the fictional character Scott Stoddard, who at this point in the film is recovering from a near fatal crash earlier in the season, although this was fairly easy since Stewart crashed on the first lap. James Garner's white "Yamura", a repainted McLaren, did not appear in the actual race and scenes showing it are part of the staged race filming.

Because of McLaren's withdrawal, Bob Bondurant's car had to be painted white overnight in order to have actual footage featuring the "Yamura" car. In addition, Phil Hill was allowed to do one lap of the track with his car having a camera mounted on its nose. He managed to avoid the entire first-lap carnage and was able to get pictures of the scene.

After his accident in this race, Jackie Stewart began his efforts for safer racing which continued for decades; particularly after his influence as a Formula One racing driver grew through the next seven seasons he competed in the sport.

== Classification ==
=== Qualifying ===
Pos	No	Driver	Constructor	Time	Gap
1	6	(United Kingdom) John Surtees	Ferrari	3:38.0	—
2	19	(Austria) Jochen Rindt	Cooper-Maserati	3:41.2	+3.2
3	15	(United Kingdom) Jackie Stewart	BRM	3:41.5	+3.5
4	3	(Australia) Jack Brabham	Brabham-Repco	3:41.8	+3.8
5	7	(Italy) Lorenzo Bandini	Ferrari	3:43.8	+5.8
6	20	(Sweden) Jo Bonnier	Cooper-Maserati	3:44.3	+6.3
7	16	(United Kingdom) Mike Spence	Lotus-BRM	3:45.2	+7.2
8	18	(United States) Richie Ginther	Cooper-Maserati	3:45.4	+7.4
9	14	(United Kingdom) Graham Hill	BRM	3:45.6	+7.6
10	10	(United Kingdom) Jim Clark	Lotus-Climax	3:45.8	+7.8
11	8	(United States) Bob Bondurant	BRM	3:50.5	+12.5
12	22	(France) Guy Ligier	Cooper-Maserati	3:51.1	+13.1
13	4	(New Zealand) Denny Hulme	Brabham-Climax	3:51.4	+13.4
14	21	(Switzerland) Jo Siffert	Cooper-Maserati	3:53.8	+15.8
15	27	(United States) Dan Gurney	Eagle-Climax	3:57.6	+19.6
16	28	(United States) Phil Hill	McLaren-Ford	4:01.7	+23.7
DNS	24	(New Zealand) Bruce McLaren	McLaren-Serenissima	3:57.6	+19.6
DNS	8	(United Kingdom) Vic Wilson	BRM	4:26.0	+48.0
DNS	11	(United Kingdom) Peter Arundell	Lotus-BRM	5:01.2	+1:23.2

- Bondurant drove car #8 in practice alongside Wilson, but he would drive car #24 in the race.

=== Race ===
Pos	No	Driver	Constructor	Laps	Time/Retired	Grid	Points
1	6	(United Kingdom) John Surtees	Ferrari	28	2:09:11.3	1	9
2	19	(Austria) Jochen Rindt	Cooper-Maserati	28	+ 42.1	2	6
3	7	(Italy) Lorenzo Bandini	Ferrari	27	+ 1 lap	5	4
4	3	(Australia) Jack Brabham	Brabham-Repco	26	+ 2 laps	4	3
5	18	(United States) Richie Ginther	Cooper-Maserati	25	+ 3 laps	8	2
NC	22	(France) Guy Ligier	Cooper-Maserati	24	+ 4 laps	12	
NC	27	(United States) Dan Gurney	Eagle-Climax	23	+ 5 laps	15	
Ret	15	(United Kingdom) Jackie Stewart	BRM	0	Accident	3	
Ret	20	(Sweden) Jo Bonnier	Cooper-Maserati	0	Accident	6	
Ret	16	(United Kingdom) Mike Spence	Lotus-BRM	0	Accident	7	
Ret	14	(United Kingdom) Graham Hill	BRM	0	Accident	9	
Ret	10	(United Kingdom) Jim Clark	Lotus-Climax	0	Engine	10	
Ret	24	(United States) Bob Bondurant	BRM	0	Accident	11	
Ret	4	(New Zealand) Denny Hulme	Brabham-Climax	0	Accident	13	
Ret	21	(Switzerland) Jo Siffert	Cooper-Maserati	0	Accident	14	
Ret	28	(United States) Phil Hill	McLaren-Ford	0	Withdrawn (camera car)	16	
DNS	24	(New Zealand) Bruce McLaren	McLaren-Serenissima		Wheel bearing in practice		
DNS	11	(United Kingdom) Peter Arundell	Lotus-BRM		Engine		
DNS	8	(United Kingdom) Vic Wilson	BRM		Car raced by Bondurant		

== Notes ==
- This was the 100th Formula One World Championship race wherein a Frenchman participated. In those 100 races, French drivers won 2 Grands Prix, achieved 23 podiums, and 2 fastest laps.
- This was the Formula One World Championship debut for American constructor Eagle.
- This was Ferrari's 5th win of a Belgian Grand Prix in the Formula One World Championship era. In total, the Scuderia had 17 podiums, 5 pole positions, 5 fastest laps and 2 Grand Slams at Spa-Francorchamps.
- This was the Formula One World Championship debut for Italian engine supplier Serenissima.

== Championship standings after the race ==
Drivers' Championship standings

	Pos	Driver	Points
1	1	(Italy) Lorenzo Bandini	10
1	2	(United Kingdom) Jackie Stewart	9
4	3	(United Kingdom) John Surtees	9
3	4	(Austria) Jochen Rindt	6
2	5	(United Kingdom) Graham Hill	4

Constructors' Championship standings

	Pos	Constructor	Points
1	1	(Italy) Ferrari	15
1	2	(United Kingdom) BRM	9
	3	(United Kingdom) Cooper-Maserati	6
	4	(United Kingdom) Brabham-Repco	3

- Notes: Only the top five positions are included for both sets of standings.

Previous race: 1966 Monaco Grand Prix	FIA Formula One World Championship; 1966 season	Next race: 1966 French Grand Prix
Previous race: 1965 Belgian Grand Prix	Belgian Grand Prix	Next race: 1967 Belgian Grand Prix
