= 1966 German Grand Prix =

Race details
- Date: 7 August 1966
- Official name: XXVIII Großer Preis von Deutschland
- Location: Nürburgring, Nürburg, West Germany
- Course: Permanent racing facility
- Course length: 22.810 km (14.168 miles)
- Distance: 15 laps, 342.15 km (212.52 miles)
- Weather: Overcast and wet

Pole position
Driver	(United Kingdom) Jim Clark	Lotus-Climax
- Time: 8:16.5

Fastest lap
Driver	(United Kingdom) John Surtees	Cooper-Maserati
- Time: 8:49.0

Podium
First	(Australia) Jack Brabham	Brabham-Repco
Second	(United Kingdom) John Surtees	Cooper-Maserati
Third	(Austria) Jochen Rindt	Cooper-Maserati

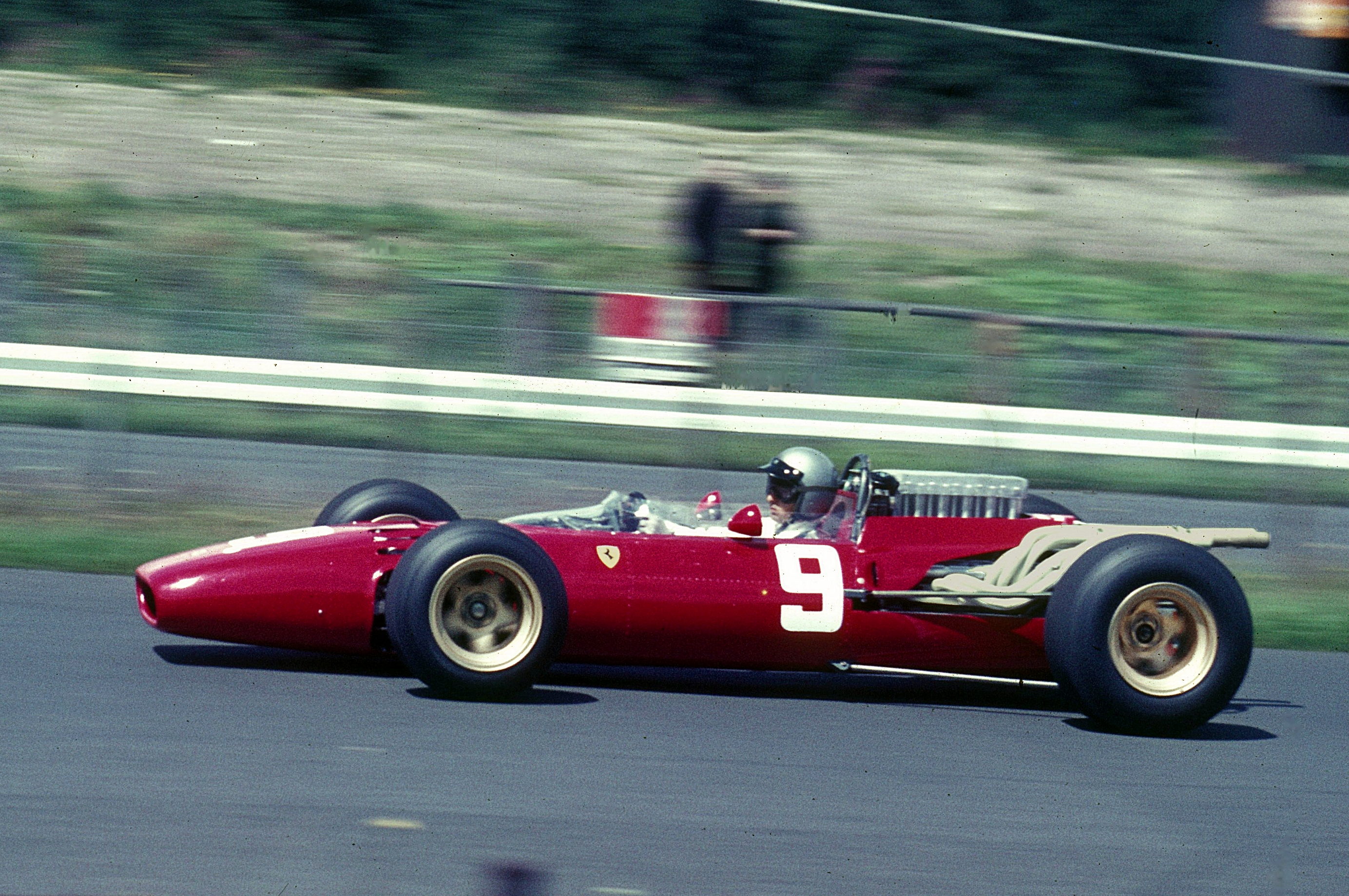
Lorenzo Bandini in his Ferrari on his way to sixth place.

The 1966 German Grand Prix was a mixed Formula One and Formula Two motor race held at the Nürburgring Nordschleife on 7 August 1966. It was race 6 of 9 in both the 1966 World Championship of Drivers and the 1966 International Cup for Formula One Manufacturers. It was the 28th German Grand Prix and the 22nd to be held at the Nordschleife. It was held over 15 laps of the 22 kilometre circuit for a race distance 342 kilometres.

The race was won by 1959 and 1960 World Champion Jack Brabham driving his Brabham BT19, his fourth win in succession. Brabham won by 43 seconds over the Cooper T81 driven by 1964 World Champion John Surtees. Surtees' Austrian teammate Jochen Rindt finished third. The first Formula Two driver to finish was French driver Jean-Pierre Beltoise in eighth driving a Matra Sports entered Matra MS5.

The race also saw the death of British driver John Taylor after a collision with Jacky Ickx.

Brabham had collected 39 points, more than double his nearest rival, BRM driver Graham Hill.

== Race report ==
Another wet track provided a duel between Jack Brabham and John Surtees for the whole race. It was not until the Cooper's clutch failed two laps from the end that the Australian's win was guaranteed. Jim Clark, despite qualifying on pole, made a mistake and spun into a ditch after using the wrong tyres. In a far more serious crash, the Tyrrell-entered Matra MS5 of Jacky Ickx and the privately entered Brabham BT11 of John Taylor crashed near the bridge between Quiddelbacher and Flugplatz. Taylor was badly burned in the accident and succumbed to his injuries four weeks later.

This would be the last Formula One race on the original Nürburgring Nordschleife before the Hohenrain chicane was added to slow the cars coming into the pits.

== Classification ==
=== Qualifying ===
Pos	No	Driver	Constructor	Time	Gap
1	1	(United Kingdom) Jim Clark	Lotus-Climax	8:16.5	—
2	7	(United Kingdom) John Surtees	Cooper-Maserati	8:18.0	+1.5
3	6	(United Kingdom) Jackie Stewart	BRM	8:18.8	+2.3
4	11	(Italy) Ludovico Scarfiotti	Ferrari	8:20.2	+3.7
5	3	(Australia) Jack Brabham	Brabham-Repco	8:20.8	+4.3
6	9	(Italy) Lorenzo Bandini	Ferrari	8:21.1	+4.6
7	10	(United Kingdom) Mike Parkes	Ferrari	8:21.7	+5.2
8	12	(United States) Dan Gurney	Eagle-Climax	8:22.8	+6.3
9	8	(Austria) Jochen Rindt	Cooper-Maserati	8:27.7	+11.2
10	5	(United Kingdom) Graham Hill	BRM	8:28.6	+12.1
11	14	(United States) Bob Bondurant	BRM	8:33.0	+16.5
12	17	(Sweden) Jo Bonnier	Cooper-Maserati	8:35.2	+18.7
13	15	(United Kingdom) Mike Spence	Lotus-BRM	8:38.6	+22.1
14	19	(United Kingdom) Bob Anderson	Brabham-Climax	8:42.5	+26.0
15	4	(New Zealand) Denny Hulme	Brabham-Repco	8:49.3	+32.8
16	27	(Belgium) Jacky Ickx	Matra-Ford	8:52.0	+35.5
17	2	(United Kingdom) Peter Arundell	Lotus-BRM	8:52.7	+36.2
18	34	(France) Jean-Pierre Beltoise	Matra-Ford	9:00.4	+43.9
19	33	(France) Jo Schlesser	Matra-Ford	9:01.5	+45.0
20	31	(Mexico) Pedro Rodríguez	Lotus-Ford	9:03.0	+46.5
21	25	(West Germany) Kurt Ahrens Jr.	Brabham-Ford	9:04.7	+48.2
22	28	(West Germany) Hans Herrmann	Brabham-Ford	9:05.7	+49.2
23	32	(United Kingdom) Piers Courage	Lotus-Ford	9:06.0	+49.5
24	29	(United Kingdom) Alan Rees	Brabham-Ford	9:08.4	+51.9
25	16	(United Kingdom) John Taylor	Brabham-BRM	9:08.9	+52.4
26	20	(United Kingdom) Chris Lawrence	Cooper-Ferrari	9:10.9	+54.4
27	26	(West Germany) Hubert Hahne	Matra-BRM	9:17.0	+1:00.5
28	35	(Switzerland) Silvio Moser	Brabham-Ford	9:17.2	+1:00.7
29	30	(West Germany) Gerhard Mitter	Lotus-Ford	9:32.2	+1:15.7
DNQ	18	(France) Guy Ligier	Cooper-Maserati	No time	—

=== Race ===
Pos	No	Driver	Constructor	Laps	Time/Retired	Grid	Points
1	3	(Australia) Jack Brabham	Brabham-Repco	15	2:27:03.0	5	9
2	7	(United Kingdom) John Surtees	Cooper-Maserati	15	+ 44.4	2	6
3	8	(Austria) Jochen Rindt	Cooper-Maserati	15	+ 2:32.6	9	4
4	5	(United Kingdom) Graham Hill	BRM	15	+ 6:41.4	10	3
5	6	(United Kingdom) Jackie Stewart	BRM	15	+ 8:28.9	3	2
6	9	(Italy) Lorenzo Bandini	Ferrari	15	+ 10:56.4	6	1
7	12	(United States) Dan Gurney	Eagle-Climax	14	Electrical	8	
8	34	(France) Jean-Pierre Beltoise	Matra-Ford	14	+ 1 lap	18	
9	26	(West Germany) Hubert Hahne	Matra-BRM	14	+ 1 lap	27	
10	33	(France) Jo Schlesser	Matra-Ford	14	+ 1 lap	19	
11	28	(West Germany) Hans Herrmann	Brabham-Ford	14	+ 1 lap	22	
12	2	(United Kingdom) Peter Arundell	Lotus-BRM	14	+ 1 lap	17	
Ret	15	(United Kingdom) Mike Spence	Lotus-BRM	12	Alternator	13	
Ret	1	(United Kingdom) Jim Clark	Lotus-Climax	11	Accident	1	
Ret	20	(United Kingdom) Chris Lawrence	Cooper-Ferrari	10	Suspension	26	
Ret	11	(Italy) Ludovico Scarfiotti	Ferrari	9	Electrical	4	
Ret	10	(United Kingdom) Mike Parkes	Ferrari	9	Accident	7	
Ret	4	(New Zealand) Denny Hulme	Brabham-Repco	8	Ignition	15	
Ret	31	(Mexico) Pedro Rodríguez	Lotus-Ford	7	Engine	20	
Ret	17	(Sweden) Jo Bonnier	Cooper-Maserati	3	Clutch	12	
Ret	32	(United Kingdom) Piers Courage	Lotus-Ford	3	Accident	23	
Ret	29	(United Kingdom) Alan Rees	Brabham-Ford	3	Engine	24	
Ret	14	(United States) Bob Bondurant	BRM	3	Engine	11	
Ret	19	(United Kingdom) Bob Anderson	Brabham-Climax	2	Transmission	14	
Ret	25	(West Germany) Kurt Ahrens Jr.	Brabham-Ford	2	Gearbox	21	
Ret	16	(United Kingdom) John Taylor	Brabham-BRM	0	Fatal Accident	25	
Ret	27	(Belgium) Jacky Ickx	Matra-Ford	0	Accident	16	
DNS	18	(France) Guy Ligier	Cooper-Maserati	0	Injury		
DNS	35	(Switzerland) Silvio Moser	Brabham-Ford	0			
DNS	30	(West Germany) Gerhard Mitter	Lotus-Ford	0			

Note: The race was held with both Formula One and Formula Two cars competing together. Formula Two entries are denoted by a pink background.

== Notes ==
- This was the Formula One World Championship debut race for British drivers Piers Courage and Alan Rees, German drivers Kurt Ahrens, jr. and Hubert Hahne, Belgian driver and future Grand Prix winner Jacky Ickx, French drivers Jo Schlesser and future Grand Prix winner Jean-Pierre Beltoise and Swiss driver Silvio Moser.
- This was the Formula One World Championship debut for French constructor Matra.
- This was Cooper's 50th and 51st podium finish.

== Championship standings after the race ==
Drivers' Championship standings

	Pos	Driver	Points
	1	(Australia) Jack Brabham	39
	2	(United Kingdom) Graham Hill	17
4	3	(United Kingdom) John Surtees	15
	4	(Austria) Jochen Rindt	15
2	5	(United Kingdom) Jackie Stewart	14

Constructors' Championship standings

Pos	Constructor	Points
1	(United Kingdom) Brabham-Repco	39
2	(Italy) Ferrari	23
3	(United Kingdom) BRM	22
4	(United Kingdom) Cooper-Maserati	17
5	(United Kingdom) Lotus-Climax	7

- Notes: Only the top five positions are included for both sets of standings.

Previous race: 1966 Dutch Grand Prix	FIA Formula One World Championship; 1966 season	Next race: 1966 Italian Grand Prix
Previous race: 1965 German Grand Prix	German Grand Prix	Next race: 1967 German Grand Prix
