= 1966 Monaco Grand Prix =

Coordinates: 43°44′4.74″N 7°25′16.8″E

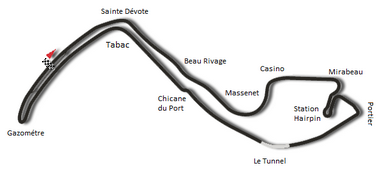

Race details
- Date: 22 May 1966
- Official name: XXIV Grand Prix Automobile de Monaco
- Location: Circuit de Monaco, Monte Carlo, Monaco
- Course: Street Circuit
- Course length: 3.145 km (1.954 miles)
- Distance: 100 laps, 314.500 km (195.400 miles)
- Weather: Overcast, Mild, Dry

Pole position
Driver	(United Kingdom) Jim Clark	Lotus-Climax
- Time: 1:29.9

Fastest lap
Driver	(Italy) Lorenzo Bandini	Ferrari
- Time: 1:29.8

Podium
First	(United Kingdom) Jackie Stewart	BRM
Second	(Italy) Lorenzo Bandini	Ferrari
Third	(United Kingdom) Graham Hill	BRM

The 1966 Monaco Grand Prix was a Formula One motor race held at the Circuit de Monaco on 22 May 1966. It was race 1 of 9 in both the 1966 World Championship of Drivers and the 1966 International Cup for Formula One Manufacturers. The race was the first World Championship event of a new era for Formula One, for which engine regulations were altered from 1.5 litres of maximum engine displacement to 3.0 litres. The race was the 24th Monaco Grand Prix.

The race was won by British driver Jackie Stewart driving a BRM P261. He took a forty-second victory over the Ferrari 246 of Italian driver Lorenzo Bandini. It was Stewart's second Grand Prix victory after winning the Italian Grand Prix the previous year. Stewart's team-mate, fellow Briton Graham Hill finished a lap down in third position in his BRM P261. The only other driver to be classified as a finisher was American driver Bob Bondurant driving a BRM P261 entered privately by Team Chamaco Collect.

== Race report ==
The first World Championship race of the new 3-litre engine formula was held in Monaco. No team was ready for the new regulations, not even those who built their own engines, like Ferrari and BRM, with several teams starting the race with 1965 engines still in place, some of them enlarged Coventry Climax V8. Even pre-1961 engines of the 2.5 litre era were used again, namely the 4cyl Coventry Climax. Some had downsized sports car racing engines to suit, but these were heavy and lacked power. As a 4.2 litre DOHC Ford Indy V8 engine had helped Jim Clark and Team Lotus win the 1965 Indianapolis 500, Bruce McLaren had contracted third parties to make the smaller 3.0 L (180 cu in) Ford 406 that had been chosen by Team McLaren for the F1 constructor debut with the McLaren M2B. It lasted for only 9 laps in the race before leaking oil.

Some sessions were filmed for the movie Grand Prix. Thus, the British-licensed as well as based and New Zealand-owned McLaren team debuted not in British racing green nor in New Zealand's traditional racing colours of green, black and silver, but instead in white and green in order for Grand Prix director John Frankenheimer to be able to use the McLaren as a double for the fictional Yamura cars in the film.

Another new engine based on an American Oldsmobile V8 was the Australian Repco-Brabham V8 in the back of Brabham's new 1966 BT19 chassis. John Surtees, though still recovering from a crash at Mosport Park, led for 14 laps from Jackie Stewart, Jochen Rindt and Denny Hulme until his differential broke, handing the lead to Stewart. Hulme retired whilst Graham Hill and Jim Clark disputed third place before Clark's suspension gave out. Meanwhile, Lorenzo Bandini was smashing the lap record before having to ease off to prevent the front brakes wearing out. Stewart won from Bandini with Graham Hill third and Bob Bondurant fourth the only other car past the line in a race of extreme attrition. New rules meant that cars had to complete 90% of the race distance to be classified and eligible for points, meaning that whilst Guy Ligier and Jo Bonnier were still racing, they were considered far enough behind to have actually retired. To this day, this race holds the record for having the fewest classified finishers in a single race in Formula One history.

== Classification ==
=== Qualifying ===
Pos	No	Driver	Constructor	Time	Gap
1	4	(United Kingdom) Jim Clark	Lotus-Climax	1:29.9	—
2	17	(United Kingdom) John Surtees	Ferrari	1:30.1	+0.2
3	12	(United Kingdom) Jackie Stewart	BRM	1:30.3	+0.4
4	11	(United Kingdom) Graham Hill	BRM	1:30.4	+0.5
5	16	(Italy) Lorenzo Bandini	Ferrari	1:30.5	+0.6
6	8	(New Zealand) Denny Hulme	Brabham-Climax	1:31.1	+1.2
7	10	(Austria) Jochen Rindt	Cooper-Maserati	1:32.2	+2.3
8	15	(United Kingdom) Bob Anderson	Brabham-Climax	1:32.5	+2.6
9	9	(United States) Richie Ginther	Cooper-Maserati	1:32.6	+2.7
10	2	(New Zealand) Bruce McLaren	McLaren-Ford	1:32.8	+2.9
11	7	(Australia) Jack Brabham	Brabham-Repco	1:32.8	+2.9
12	6	(United Kingdom) Mike Spence	Lotus-BRM	1:33.5	+3.6
13	14	(Switzerland) Jo Siffert	Brabham-BRM	1:34.4	+4.5
14	18	(Sweden) Jo Bonnier	Cooper-Maserati	1:35.0	+5.1
15	21	(France) Guy Ligier	Cooper-Maserati	1:35.2	+5.3
16	19	(United States) Bob Bondurant	BRM	1:37.3	+7.4
DNS	20	(United States) Phil Hill	Lotus-Climax	1:42.2	+12.3

=== Race ===
Pos	No	Driver	Constructor	Laps	Time/Retired	Grid	Points
1	12	(United Kingdom) Jackie Stewart	BRM	100	2:33:10.5	3	9
2	16	(Italy) Lorenzo Bandini	Ferrari	100	+ 40.2	5	6
3	11	(United Kingdom) Graham Hill	BRM	99	+ 1 lap	4	4
4	19	(United States) Bob Bondurant	BRM	95	+ 5 laps	16	3
Ret	9	(United States) Richie Ginther	Cooper-Maserati	80	Transmission	9	
NC	21	(France) Guy Ligier	Cooper-Maserati	75	+ 25 laps	15	
NC	18	(Sweden) Jo Bonnier	Cooper-Maserati	73	+ 27 laps	14	
Ret	4	(United Kingdom) Jim Clark	Lotus-Climax	60	Suspension	1	
Ret	10	(Austria) Jochen Rindt	Cooper-Maserati	56	Engine	7	
Ret	14	(Switzerland) Jo Siffert	Brabham-BRM	35	Clutch	13	
Ret	6	(United Kingdom) Mike Spence	Lotus-BRM	34	Suspension	12	
Ret	7	(Australia) Jack Brabham	Brabham-Repco	17	Gearbox	11	
Ret	17	(United Kingdom) John Surtees	Ferrari	16	Transmission	2	
Ret	8	(New Zealand) Denny Hulme	Brabham-Climax	15	Transmission	6	
Ret	2	(New Zealand) Bruce McLaren	McLaren-Ford	9	Oil leak	10	
Ret	15	(United Kingdom) Bob Anderson	Brabham-Climax	3	Engine	8	
DNS	20	(United States) Phil Hill	Lotus-Climax		Camera car		
WD	1	(New Zealand) Chris Amon	McLaren-Ford				
WD	3	(United Kingdom) Peter Arundell	Lotus-BRM				
WD	5	(United Kingdom) Richard Attwood	BRM				

== Notes ==
- This was the Formula One World Championship debut race for French driver Guy Ligier.
- This was BRM's fourth win of the Monaco Grand Prix, thereby breaking the old record of three wins in Monte Carlo set by Cooper at the 1962 Monaco Grand Prix.
- This was the Formula One World Championship debut for McLaren.
- This was the Formula One World Championship debut for Repco, the first Australian and Oceanian engine supplier in Formula One.

== Championship standings after the race ==
Drivers' Championship standings

Pos	Driver	Points
1	(United Kingdom) Jackie Stewart	9
2	(Italy) Lorenzo Bandini	6
3	(United Kingdom) Graham Hill	4
4	(United States) Bob Bondurant	3

Constructors' Championship standings

Pos	Constructor	Points
1	(United Kingdom) BRM	9
2	(Italy) Ferrari	6

- Notes: Only the top five positions are included for both sets of standings.

Previous race: 1965 Mexican Grand Prix	FIA Formula One World Championship; 1966 season	Next race: 1966 Belgian Grand Prix
Previous race: 1965 Monaco Grand Prix	Monaco Grand Prix	Next race: 1967 Monaco Grand Prix
