= 1966 French Grand Prix =

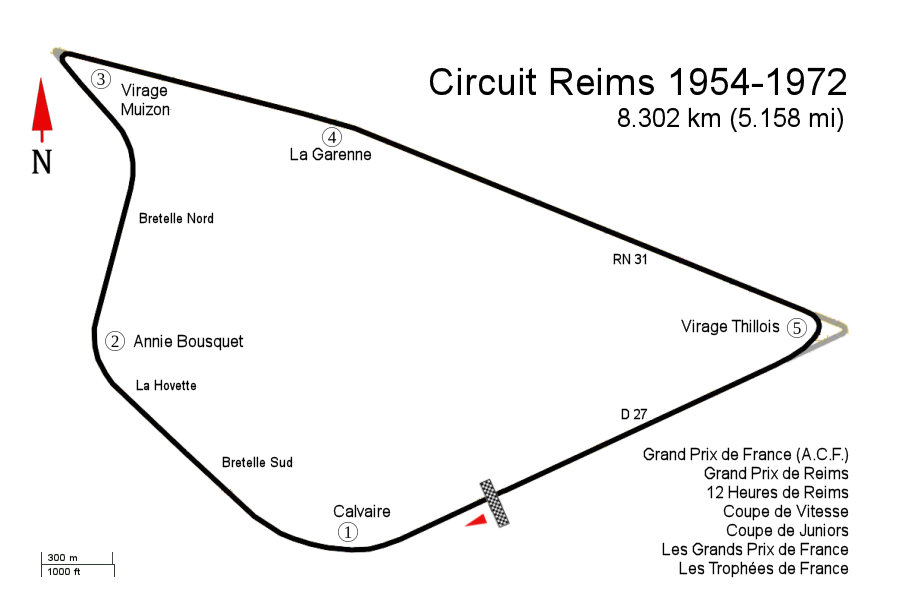
- Reims-Gueux

Race details
- Date: 3 July 1966
- Official name: 52e Grand Prix de l'ACF
- Location: Reims-Gueux, Reims, France
- Course: Temporary road course
- Course length: 8.348 km (5.187 miles)
- Distance: 48 laps, 400.694 km (248.980 miles)
- Weather: Hot, dry

Pole position
Driver	(Italy) Lorenzo Bandini	Ferrari
- Time: 2:07.8

Fastest lap
Driver	(Italy) Lorenzo Bandini	Ferrari
- Time: 2:11.3

Podium
First	(Australia) Jack Brabham	Brabham-Repco
Second	(United Kingdom) Mike Parkes	Ferrari
Third	(New Zealand) Denny Hulme	Brabham-Repco

The 1966 French Grand Prix was a Formula One motor race held at Reims on 3 July 1966. It was race 3 of 9 in both the 1966 World Championship of Drivers and the 1966 International Cup for Formula One Manufacturers. The race was the "60th Anniversary race" of Grand Prix racing, which had started with the GP of France in 1906. It was also the 16th and last time the French Grand Prix was held on variations of French highways near Reims, following a three-year absence from the region. The race was held over 48 laps of the 8.35-kilometre (5.19 mi) circuit for a race distance of 400.694 kilometres (248.980 mi).

The race was won by the 1959 and 1960 World Champion, Australian driver Jack Brabham, driving his Brabham BT19. It was Brabham's eighth Grand Prix victory and his first since the 1960 Portuguese Grand Prix, six years earlier. It was also his first win since establishing his Brabham team, and the first win for the Australian-developed Repco-Brabham V8 engine. Brabham became the first driver to win a World Championship Grand Prix in a car bearing his own name. British driver Mike Parkes finished second in a Ferrari 312, 9.5 seconds behind, while Brabham's team-mate, New Zealander Denny Hulme, finished third in his Brabham BT20, albeit two laps down.

Brabham now led the Driver's Championship on 12 points, two ahead of Ferrari driver Lorenzo Bandini and three ahead of BRM's Jackie Stewart and Ferrari's John Surtees. The win was the first of four in succession for Brabham as he began his march towards his third world title.

== Race summary ==
Jim Clark was a non-starter, recovering from an accident after he was hit in the eye by a bird during practice. Qualifying was firmly in the hands of Ferrari and especially Lorenzo Bandini with a pole set at 2:07.8 in his 3-litre 312/66, averaging 146.112 mph (233.780 km/h). After the start, Bandini duly led, with Jack Brabham in what would later be nicknamed his 'Old Nail' BT19 – which had a bit less straightline speed – following in his slipstream for a while. Mike Parkes, who had taken over at Ferrari from John Surtees acquitted himself well, duelling with Graham Hill for third place, becoming second when Hill's camshaft broke. When the Italian had to retire due to a broken throttle linkage, Brabham took first place at the finish – his first win since the 1960 Portuguese Grand Prix and the first driver to win a championship Grand Prix in his own car. It was also the last race ever at Reims-Gueux, the original venue of the Formula One French Grand Prix.

1950 World Champion Nino Farina died in a car accident while on his way to watch this race.

== Classification ==
=== Qualifying ===
Pos	No	Driver	Constructor	Time	Gap
1	20	(Italy) Lorenzo Bandini	Ferrari	2:07.8	—
2	10	(United Kingdom) John Surtees	Cooper-Maserati	2:08.4	+0.6
3	22	(United Kingdom) Mike Parkes	Ferrari	2:09.1	+1.3
4	12	(Australia) Jack Brabham	Brabham-Repco	2:10.2	+2.4
5	6	(Austria) Jochen Rindt	Cooper-Maserati	2:10.9	+3.1
6	38	(Switzerland) Jo Siffert	Cooper-Maserati	2:12.2	+4.4
7	8	(New Zealand) Chris Amon	Cooper-Maserati	2:12.4	+4.6
8	16	(United Kingdom) Graham Hill	BRM	2:12.8	+5.0
9	14	(New Zealand) Denny Hulme	Brabham-Repco	2:13.3	+5.5
10	32	(United Kingdom) Mike Spence	Lotus-BRM	2:14.2	+6.4
11	42	(France) Guy Ligier	Cooper-Maserati	2:15.4	+7.6
12	36	(United Kingdom) Bob Anderson	Brabham-Climax	2:15.6	+7.8
13	2	(United Kingdom) Jim Clark	Lotus-Climax	2:15.6	+7.8
14	2	(Mexico) Pedro Rodríguez	Lotus-Climax	2:16.5	+8.7
15	26	(United States) Dan Gurney	Eagle-Climax	2:17.9	+10.1
16	44	(United Kingdom) John Taylor	Brabham-BRM	2:19.2	+11.4
17	4	(United Kingdom) Peter Arundell	Lotus-BRM	2:19.6	+11.8
18	30	(Sweden) Jo Bonnier	Brabham-Climax	2:23.5	+15.7

=== Race ===
Pos	No	Driver	Constructor	Laps	Time/Retired	Grid	Points
1	12	(Australia) Jack Brabham	Brabham-Repco	48	1:48:31.3	4	9
2	22	(United Kingdom) Mike Parkes	Ferrari	48	+ 9.5	3	6
3	14	(New Zealand) Denny Hulme	Brabham-Repco	46	+ 2 Laps	9	4
4	6	(Austria) Jochen Rindt	Cooper-Maserati	46	+ 2 Laps	5	3
5	26	(United States) Dan Gurney	Eagle-Climax	45	+ 3 Laps	14	2
6	44	(United Kingdom) John Taylor	Brabham-BRM	45	+ 3 Laps	15	1
7	36	(United Kingdom) Bob Anderson	Brabham-Climax	44	+ 4 Laps	12	
8	8	(New Zealand) Chris Amon	Cooper-Maserati	44	+ 4 Laps	7	
NC	42	(France) Guy Ligier	Cooper-Maserati	42	+ 6 Laps	11	
Ret	2	(Mexico) Pedro Rodríguez	Lotus-Climax	40	Oil Leak	13	
NC	20	(Italy) Lorenzo Bandini	Ferrari	37	+ 11 Laps	1	
NC	30	(Sweden) Jo Bonnier	Brabham-Climax	32	+ 16 Laps	17	
Ret	16	(United Kingdom) Graham Hill	BRM	13	Engine	8	
Ret	38	(Switzerland) Jo Siffert	Cooper-Maserati	10	Fuel System	6	
Ret	32	(United Kingdom) Mike Spence	Lotus-BRM	8	Clutch	10	
Ret	10	(United Kingdom) John Surtees	Cooper-Maserati	5	Fuel System	2	
Ret	4	(United Kingdom) Peter Arundell	Lotus-BRM	3	Gearbox	16	
DNS	2	(United Kingdom) Jim Clark	Lotus-Climax		Accident	(18)	

== Championship standings after the race ==
Drivers' Championship standings

	Pos	Driver	Points
6	1	(Australia) Jack Brabham	12
1	2	(Italy) Lorenzo Bandini	10
	3	(United Kingdom) John Surtees	9
2	4	(United Kingdom) Jackie Stewart	9
1	5	(Austria) Jochen Rindt	9

Constructors' Championship standings

	Pos	Constructor	Points
	1	(Italy) Ferrari	21
2	2	(United Kingdom) Brabham-Repco	12
1	3	(United Kingdom) BRM	9
1	4	(United Kingdom) Cooper-Maserati	9
	5	(United States) Eagle-Climax	2

- Note: Only the top five positions are included for both sets of standings.

Previous race: 1966 Belgian Grand Prix	FIA Formula One World Championship; 1966 season	Next race: 1966 British Grand Prix
Previous race: 1965 French Grand Prix	French Grand Prix	Next race: 1967 French Grand Prix
Previous race: 1965 Belgian Grand Prix	European Grand Prix (Designated European Grand Prix)	Next race: 1967 Italian Grand Prix
