= 1966 Dutch Grand Prix =

Race details
- Date: July 24, 1966
- Official name: XIV Grote Prijs van Nederland
- Location: Circuit Zandvoort, Zandvoort, Netherlands
- Course: Permanent racing facility
- Course length: 4.252 km (2.642 miles)
- Distance: 90 laps, 382.68 km (237.78 miles)
- Weather: Sunny, Mild, Dry

Pole position
Driver	(Australia) Jack Brabham	Brabham-Repco
- Time: 1:28.1

Fastest lap
Driver	(New Zealand) Denny Hulme	Brabham-Repco
- Time: 1:30.6

Podium
First	(Australia) Jack Brabham	Brabham-Repco
Second	(United Kingdom) Graham Hill	BRM
Third	(United Kingdom) Jim Clark	Lotus-Climax

The 1966 Dutch Grand Prix was a Formula One motor race held at Zandvoort on July 24, 1966. It was race 5 of 9 in both the 1966 World Championship of Drivers and the 1966 International Cup for Formula One Manufacturers. The race was the 16th Dutch Grand Prix since it was first held in 1948. It was held over 90 laps of the four kilometre circuit for a race distance of 382 kilometres.

The race was the third in succession to be won by Australian driver, 1959 and 1960 world champion, Jack Brabham in his Brabham BT19. Brabham lapped the field on his way to his second Dutch Grand Prix victory to add to his win in 1960. British driver, 1962 world champion Graham Hill finished second in his BRM P261, himself a lap ahead of the rest of the field. Reigning world champion Jim Clark took his first podium finish of the year in his Lotus 33, after duelling with the Brabhams in the early stages, even leading the race and pulling away before suffering a water pump failure that set him back two laps.

Brabham's win expanded his points lead to 16 points over Hill, with Hill's BRM teammate Jackie Stewart two points further away.

== Classification ==
=== Qualifying ===
Pos	No	Driver	Constructor	Time	Gap
1	16	(Australia) Jack Brabham	Brabham-Repco	1:28.1	—
2	18	(New Zealand) Denny Hulme	Brabham-Repco	1:28.7	+0.6
3	6	(United Kingdom) Jim Clark	Lotus-Climax	1:28.7	+0.6
4	10	(United States) Dan Gurney	Eagle-Climax	1:28.8	+0.7
5	4	(United Kingdom) Mike Parkes	Ferrari	1:29.0	+0.9
6	26	(Austria) Jochen Rindt	Cooper-Maserati	1:29.2	+1.1
7	12	(United Kingdom) Graham Hill	BRM	1:29.7	+1.6
8	14	(United Kingdom) Jackie Stewart	BRM	1:29.8	+1.7
9	2	(Italy) Lorenzo Bandini	Ferrari	1:30.0	+1.9
10	24	(United Kingdom) John Surtees	Cooper-Maserati	1:30.6	+2.5
11	28	(Switzerland) Jo Siffert	Cooper-Maserati	1:31.1	+3.0
12	32	(United Kingdom) Mike Spence	Lotus-BRM	1:31.4	+3.3
13	30	(Sweden) Jo Bonnier	Cooper-Maserati	1:31.7	+3.6
14	20	(New Zealand) Bruce McLaren	McLaren-Serenissima	1:31.7	+3.6
15	34	(United Kingdom) Bob Anderson	Brabham-Climax	1:32.0	+3.9
16	8	(United Kingdom) Peter Arundell	Lotus-BRM	1:32.0	+3.9
17	36	(France) Guy Ligier	Cooper-Maserati	1:35.0	+6.9
18	38	(United Kingdom) John Taylor	Brabham-BRM	1:35.7	+7.6

=== Race ===
Pos	No	Driver	Constructor	Laps	Time/Retired	Grid	Points
1	16	(Australia) Jack Brabham	Brabham-Repco	90	2:20:32.5	1	9
2	12	(United Kingdom) Graham Hill	BRM	89	+ 1 lap	7	6
3	6	(United Kingdom) Jim Clark	Lotus-Climax	88	+ 2 laps	3	4
4	14	(United Kingdom) Jackie Stewart	BRM	88	+ 2 laps	8	3
5	32	(United Kingdom) Mike Spence	Lotus-BRM	87	+ 3 laps	12	2
6	2	(Italy) Lorenzo Bandini	Ferrari	87	+ 3 laps	9	1
7	30	(Sweden) Jo Bonnier	Cooper-Maserati	84	+ 6 laps	13	
8	38	(United Kingdom) John Taylor	Brabham-BRM	84	+ 6 laps	17	
9	36	(France) Guy Ligier	Cooper-Maserati	84	+ 6 laps	16	
Ret	28	(Switzerland) Jo Siffert	Cooper-Maserati	79	Engine	11	
Ret	34	(United Kingdom) Bob Anderson	Brabham-Climax	73	Suspension	14	
Ret	24	(United Kingdom) John Surtees	Cooper-Maserati	44	Electrical	10	
Ret	18	(New Zealand) Denny Hulme	Brabham-Repco	37	Ignition	2	
Ret	8	(United Kingdom) Peter Arundell	Lotus-BRM	28	Ignition	15	
Ret	10	(United States) Dan Gurney	Eagle-Climax	26	Oil Leak	4	
Ret	4	(United Kingdom) Mike Parkes	Ferrari	10	Accident	5	
Ret	26	(Austria) Jochen Rindt	Cooper-Maserati	2	Accident	6	
DNS	20	(New Zealand) Bruce McLaren	McLaren-Serenissima		Engine		

== Championship standings after the race ==
Drivers' Championship standings

	Pos	Driver	Points
	1	(Australia) Jack Brabham	30
5	2	(United Kingdom) Graham Hill	14
3	3	(United Kingdom) Jackie Stewart	12
2	4	(Austria) Jochen Rindt	11
1	5	(Italy) Lorenzo Bandini	11

Constructors' Championship standings

Pos	Constructor	Points
1	(United Kingdom) Brabham-Repco	30
2	(Italy) Ferrari	22
3	(United Kingdom) BRM	19
4	(United Kingdom) Cooper-Maserati	11
5	(United Kingdom) Lotus-Climax	7

- Notes: Only the top five positions are included for both sets of standings.

Previous race: 1966 British Grand Prix	FIA Formula One World Championship; 1966 season	Next race: 1966 German Grand Prix
Previous race: 1965 Dutch Grand Prix	Dutch Grand Prix	Next race: 1967 Dutch Grand Prix
