= Henry Pelham Lee =

Henry Pelham Lee (1877–1953) was an English engine pioneer.

== Biography ==
Lee was born in Putney the son of a London architect. Known as Horace by his family. Following his education at Bradfield College he studied electrical engineering in Kensington. He served with the Royal Buckinghamshire Hussars during the Boer War, and on his return to England he moved to Coventry to finish his engineering training with the Daimler Company.

In 1903, Lee left Daimler convinced that his future lay, not in electrical engineering, but in the development of the internal combustion engine. That year he, in partnership with Jens Stroyer, a Dane, founded the Lee Stroyer company in Coventry, producing petrol engines, and a limited number of cars.

Following the departure of Stroyer in 1905 Lee relocated and renamed the company Coventry Simplex. The company continued the production of engines which were used in many early cars including the Abbey, the Ashton-Evans, the Crouch 11/27 and Marendaz cars.

In 1917, Lee's engine company became Coventry Climax Engines, a company which, in the 1960s, produced championship Formula One and Two racing engines.

By the late 1930s, Lee had passed the running of Coventry Climax to his son, Leonard Pelham Lee.
