= GWK =

GWK may stand for:

- Garuda Wisnu Kencana Cultural Park, a cultural park in Indonesia
- GWK (car), a light car made in England between 1911 and 1931
- Griqua Park in Kimberley, South Africa, previously known by its sponsor's name as GWK Park
