= Godiva Fire Pumps =

Godiva Ltd
- Type: Private Company
- Industry: Fire pumps
- Founded: United Kingdom (1967)
- Headquarters: Warwick, United Kingdom
- Products: Fire Pumps
- Owner: IDEX Corporation
- Website: godiva.co.uk

Godiva Fire Pumps was an offshoot from Coventry Climax, directed by Charles Pelham Lee, son of Leonard Pelham Lee.

== Company history ==
The building of fire pumps was initially developed as a division of the Coventry Climax engine company in the late 1930s – the company primarily made engines for motor cars, but during WW1 had produced engines to drive generators to power searchlights.

In 1963 Jaguar took ownership of Coventry Climax, and in 1966 Jaguar merged with British Motor Corporation, which via further mergers became British Motor Holdings then merged with Leyland to form British Leyland in 1968. Now part of a huge group under British Leyland, British Leyland completed the transfer of Coventry Climax into their special products division in December 1971. At this point Leonard Lee stepped down as chairman of Coventry Climax and left the business which his father had created in 1903. When he left he took with him the Godiva Fire Pump business, and merged it with his Iso-Speedic Company of Warwick (manufacturers of electric vehicles, fork lift chains, and engine speed regulators) – with both businesses held by the Pelham Lee Group. Adverts from 1973/1974 indicate that Godiva Fire Pumps were considered a division of the Iso-Speedic Company.

In 1979 Pelham Lee Holdings Ltd were acquired by Booker McConnell for £1.9 million. Under Booker, Godiva Fire Pumps came under Sigmund Pulsometer Pumps Ltd [SPP Pumps Ltd] Pulsometer pump – who within a 9-month period also acquired Europump Services Ltd of Bristol and 76% share in Robot Pumpen NV of Holland.

In April 1988 Braithwaite Holding Company acquired SPP Pumps Ltd Pulsometer pump (and hence Godiva Fire Pumps) for £31 million. In 1989 they put the Godiva business up for sale, and later that year it was sold and merged with the US Company, Hale Products. In 1994 both were taken over by IDEX Corporation. Godiva pumps continue to be made in Warwick, England.

== Products ==
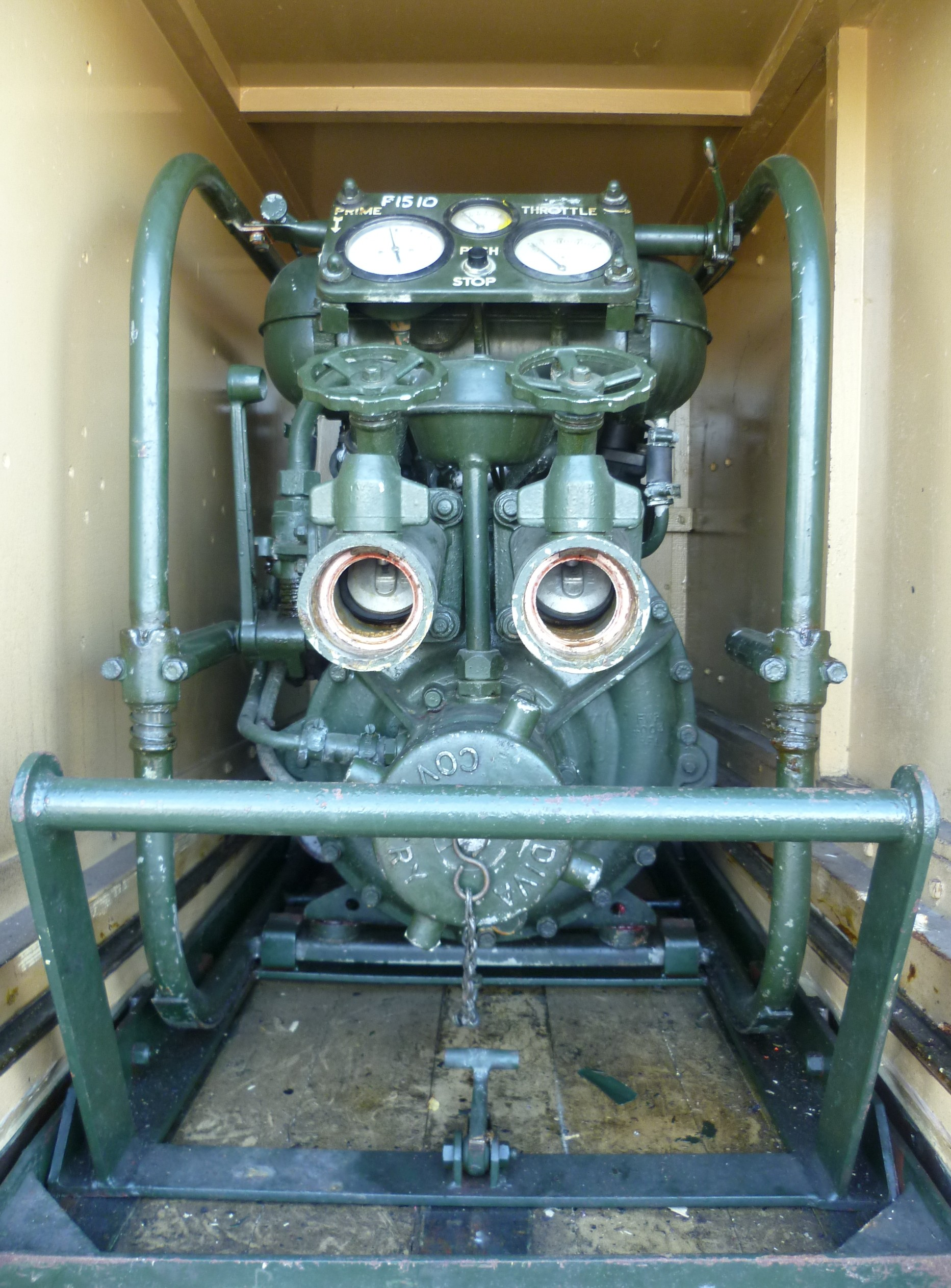
Godiva fire pump in a Green Goddess

The fire pump was developed by Coventry Climax in the late 1930s, and was referred to as the Coventry Climax fire pump, the name Godiva appears in 1940, and may have its origins in the steam pump operated by Coventry Fire Brigade named "Godiva". This was the second such engine operated by Coventry Fire Brigade and was christened at a well attended ceremony in 1889 (the first was "Sherborne" made in 1872). It was remembered in the Coventry papers on its 50th anniversary – in 1939.

By 1938 large numbers of the Coventry trailer pumps were being purchased by fire brigades, and demonstrated to ARP staff and members of the Auxiliary Fire Service. The "Coventry Climax trailer pump" was described as being capable of delivering 250–300 imperial gallons per minute (1,100–1,400 L/min). "A complete, self-contained unit, with a powerful petrol-driven engine, it is towed behind a lorry and will be on patrol through the streets in the event of an air raid".

In January 1940 they claimed they were the "World's largest producer of trailer fire engines" with over 6000 ordered by H.M.Government. As well as supplying the Fire Service and the AFS, hundreds had been supplied to foreign governments and major companies. Two models were listed, the smaller 120/220GPM model claimed 140 imperial gallons per minute (640 L/min) at 100 psi (690 kPa) with a ten-foot (three-metre) lift, the larger model was the 500GPM claiming 520 imp gal/min (2,400 L/min) at 100 psi (690 kPa) with a 10 ft (3 m) lift. In addition to the large numbers bought by the Ministry of Defence during WW2, the fire pumps were also exported to the United States and used to fight forest fires.

One of the most unusual spin-offs from post war fire pump development were race car engines. After the war the Government asked Coventry Climax to develop a portable self-contained pump unit capable of delivering 350 gallons per minute. The new power unit designed for this pump unit was such a successful combination of light weight and high power that it formed the basis for a line of race car engines. The portable pump unit created in 1950 was named the "feather weight pump" (FWP). The lightweight aluminium engine of 1,020 cm^{3} (62 cu in) featured an overhead camshaft and produced 38 bhp (28 kW). Three years after the FWP came out, the pump engine had been adapted for car racing use. The first racing engines had designations FWA, and were to be an outstanding success. Main article : Coventry Climax

In the post war period the pumps found a role in the Cold War civil defence preparations, with the portable Godiva pump units being carried in vehicles called "The Green Goddess". These were pump vehicles extensively used by the auxiliary fire service during the cold war and called upon to relieve the firemen's strikes in the 1970s and 1980s. The portable pumps later became diesel powered, and trailer mounted versions were also available.

A new development in 1971 was the Godiva UMP pump. This was a two-stage unit allowing it to work as high volume low-pressure, or low-volume high pressure.. This was fitted to fire engines, for example the Hestair Dennis R133. The UMP and other Godiva pump types were and are fitted to a wide range of fire appliances including Dennis Carmichael airport fire tender (UFP pump), Mercedes Benz 263A airport fire tender (UMPX pump), Mercedes-Benz Atego 1023/1325, MAN L2000, and Volvo FL6 . Godiva also devised remote fire fighting systems for use by the Royal Navy following the Falklands War.

Godiva Fire Pumps continued to provide parts for the Coventry Climax forklift truck at a factory on the northern outskirts of Leamington Spa.
