= Leonard Pelham Lee =

Leonard Pelham Lee (1903–1980) was an executive in the English internal combustion engine industry.

== Biography ==
Leonard Pelham Lee was born on 31 May 1903, the son of Horace Pelham Lee. He joined Coventry Climax Engines in 1919 and was appointed a Director in 1927. In 1933 he married Ivy D. Jones, with whom he had a son, Charles Pelham Lee.

Following the death of his father in 1953, Lee became Chairman and Managing Director of Coventry Climax Engines. Four years later, in 1957, he was appointed Chairman of Godiva Fire Pumps. He lived at Park House on Warwick Road in Coventry, and in 1960, at the age of 57, was elected Chairman of the British Internal Combustion Engine Manufacturers Association. He died in 1980 in Warwickshire, England.

== Formula One ==
In 1961, Coventry Climax was dominating the British Formula One field with the successful FPF and FWMV engines, but FWMV's initial selling price (3,000 Pounds), though considerably higher than the selling price of FPF (2,250 Pounds), did not cover the development cost and the mounting maintenance cost as more and more teams wanted to run it. He announced that the situation is the equivalent of his company subsidising the teams, so that the company will withdraw from Formula One racing at the end of the year.

As the customer teams did not have alternative engine suppliers, and thus being totally dependent on the supply of the FWMV engine, the teams got together and negotiated with Lee so that Oil company sponsorship funds would be funneled through the teams to Coventry Climax to cover the mounting costs, and Lee agreed to continue the development and support of these engines.

This incident became the seed for the formation of Formula One Constructors Association later in the 1970s.

== Dewar Trophy ==
In May 1964, the Royal Automobile Club presented the Dewar Trophy, which is given at the recommendation of RAC's Technical and Engineering Committee for the most outstanding British achievement in the automotive field, to Leonard Pelham Lee. The citation reads: "Awarded to Coventry Climax Engines Ltd. for the design, development and production of engines which have brought British cars to the forefront in the field of Grand Prix racing."

History of this trophy dates back to 1906. The last time Dewar Trophy was awarded before 1964, the recipient was Alec Issigonis for British Motor Corporation in 1959, who once was a Junior Engineer at Coventry Climax, on the design and production of ADO15 Mini.

== See also ==
- Henry Pelham Lee
- Coventry Climax Engines
- Godiva Fire Pumps
