= Zoller supercharger =

Zoller's supercharged "Doppelkolben" engine

The Zoller supercharger was a vane-type supercharger created by Arnold Zoller (1882-1934) who had patents regarding supercharging engines before WW1. The Zoller supercharger was popular in the 1920s and 1930s.

== Company History ==
In the UK the distributor for Zoller superchargers was Forced Induction Ltd of London c1931, then M.A. McEvoy (London) Ltd of Leaper Street Works, Derby. A McEvoy advert in 1933 claimed they designed, and made the Zoller superchargers. Supporting that they were manufactured in the UK was an article from 1939 which stated that they were manufactured in the UK from 1931 to 1936. This also stated that they were made under licence by Petters Limited of Yeovil for application to their 2-stroke engine, though by 1945 the Petter superscavenge (SS) engine had Roots-type blowers (Holmes-Connersville blowers on the six cylinder).

Although Arnold Zoller died in 1934, McEvoy displayed the Zoller supercharger (manufactured at their Derby works) at the 1935 Berlin show, and it appears it was manufactured until the war, though from 1936 McEvoy had been developing a new supercharger they called the 'Velox' (also a vane type, but with variable boost). By mid-1939 they had experimental ones made for testing, unfortunately they were made in Taunus, Germany.

== Technical Data ==
Zoller had a particular interest in high performance 2-stroke engines, in particular those with two parallel cylinders sharing a common combustion chamber, with the pistons arranged so that one uncovered the inlet port and the other the exhaust port. His patented linked con-rod design was adopted by DKW for their highly successful pre-war racing motorcycles. These engines responded very well to supercharging, typically using a piston type charger (e.g. DKW SS 350), though the 1939 250 and 350 US models used rotary superchargers. Zoller had something rather larger in mind, and his 12-cylinder 1500cc racing engine (with twin Zoller superchargers) produced 200 bhp - he also made a 723cc eight cylinder engine for car use that produced 30 hp at 2600rpm.

Zoller's supercharger patents (initially targeted specifically at two stroke engines) also date back to 1910. This patented design was updated in 1923 to a type similar to those sold by McEvoy, and used by car makers such as Lagonda (although they also used the Cozette supercharger). Further patented refinements followed, as well as the patent for his supercharged two-stroke engine.

== Applications ==
According to the McEvoy advertising in 1933, the Zoller supercharger had been used with the following engines :

- Industrial and Marine
  - Sulzer
  - Swiss Locomotive Works
  - Brown Boveri
  - A.E.G.
- Small diesel engines
  - Hirshi A.G.
  - Süddeutsche Bremsen-AG
- Car
  - D.K.W.
  - Lagonda
  - Marendaz
- Motor Cycle
  - BMW Racer

The AJS V4 racing motorcycle was fitted with a Zoller supercharger in 1936, and stayed with it through subsequent development until 1939 when the war intervened, though it did manage the first 100 mph lap on the Ulster Grand Prix in its final year.

The E.R.A. (English Racing Automobiles Ltd.) race car - made from 1936 until the war in very small numbers, used a highly modified and supercharged Riley engine. Several were fitted with Zoller superchargers, others had a Roots-type supercharger.

The Zoller designed supercharged 2-stroke engine was reviewed in 1931, and this also mentions that a "well-known central European Motor Works" has produced a 3-litre 12 cylinder version. The 723cc unit produced 30 bhp at 2600rpm, but it never went into production. A 12-cylinder version, of 1500cc was raced at least twice in 1934 suffering mechanical problems and then overheating problems in the next race, but later that year Arnold Zoller collapsed and died, and the true potential of the design was never fully explored.
