= 1966 British Grand Prix =

Race details
- Date: 16 July 1966
- Official name: XIX RAC British Grand Prix
- Location: Brands Hatch; Kent, England
- Course: Permanent racing facility
- Course length: 4.26 km (2.65 miles)
- Distance: 80 laps, 341.18 km (212.00 miles)
- Weather: Wet, drying later

Pole position
Driver	(Australia) Jack Brabham	Brabham-Repco
- Time: 1:34.5

Fastest lap
Driver	(Australia) Jack Brabham	Brabham-Repco
- Time: 1:37.0

Podium
First	(Australia) Jack Brabham	Brabham-Repco
Second	(New Zealand) Denny Hulme	Brabham-Repco
Third	(United Kingdom) Graham Hill	BRM

The 1966 British Grand Prix was a Formula One motor race held at Brands Hatch on 16 July 1966. It was race 4 of 9 in both the 1966 World Championship of Drivers and the 1966 International Cup for Formula One Manufacturers. It was the 21st British Grand Prix and the second to be held at Brands Hatch. It was held over 80 laps of the four kilometre circuit for a race distance of 341 kilometres.

The race, the first of the new three-litre engine regulation era where starters reached 20 cars, was won for the third time by Australian driver Jack Brabham in his Brabham BT19, his second win in succession after winning the French Grand Prix two weeks earlier. New Zealand driver Denny Hulme finished second in his Brabham BT20, a first 1–2 win for the Brabham team. The pair finished a lap ahead of third placed British driver Graham Hill in his BRM P261. Ferrari did not participate in this Grand Prix weekend to honour a metalworkers strike in Italy.

Brabham's win ended a streak of 4 consecutive wins by Jim Clark at the British Grand Prix.

Brabham's win put him ten points clear in the championship chase over Austrian Cooper racer Jochen Rindt with Hulme and Ferrari's Lorenzo Bandini a point further back.

== Race summary ==
Brabham and Hill duelled at the start, until rain storms arrived on the circuit. Whilst Brabham maintained his lead, Rindt who had changed to rain tyres was catching him rapidly, whilst John Surtees in the Cooper was in third, well clear of the rest of the field. Hill and Jim Clark then battled for second and third until Clark pitted and then Hulme took over second place. As the rain dried, Rindt fell back. Surtees retired with mechanical problems, leaving Clark in fourth. Brabham duly led home teammate Hulme, Hill, Clark, Rindt and Bruce McLaren.

== Classification ==
=== Qualifying ===
Pos	No	Driver	Constructor	Time	Gap
1	5	(Australia) Jack Brabham	Brabham-Repco	1:34.5	—
2	6	(New Zealand) Denny Hulme	Brabham-Repco	1:34.8	+0.3
3	16	(United States) Dan Gurney	Eagle-Climax	1:35.8	+1.3
4	3	(United Kingdom) Graham Hill	BRM	1:36.0	+1.5
5	1	(United Kingdom) Jim Clark	Lotus-Climax	1:36.1	+1.6
6	12	(United Kingdom) John Surtees	Cooper-Maserati	1:36.4	+1.9
7	11	(Austria) Jochen Rindt	Cooper-Maserati	1:36.6	+2.1
8	4	(United Kingdom) Jackie Stewart	BRM	1:36.9	+2.4
9	17	(United Kingdom) Mike Spence	Lotus-BRM	1:37.3	+2.8
10	21	(United Kingdom) Bob Anderson	Brabham-Climax	1:37.5	+3.0
11	20	(Switzerland) Jo Siffert	Cooper-Maserati	1:38.0	+3.5
12	7	(United Kingdom) Chris Irwin	Brabham-Climax	1:38.1	+3.6
13	14	(New Zealand) Bruce McLaren	McLaren-Serenissima	1:38.5	+4.0
14	25	(United States) Bob Bondurant	BRM	1:38.9	+4.4
15	18	(Sweden) Jo Bonnier	Brabham-Climax	1:39.3	+4.8
16	22	(United Kingdom) John Taylor	Brabham-BRM	1:40.0	+5.5
17	19	(France) Guy Ligier	Cooper-Maserati	1:41.4	+6.9
18	23	(United Kingdom) Trevor Taylor	Shannon-Climax	1:41.6	+7.1
19	24	(United Kingdom) Chris Lawrence	Cooper-Ferrari	1:43.8	+9.3
20	2	(United Kingdom) Peter Arundell	Lotus-BRM	1:54.3	+19.8

=== Race ===
Pos	No	Driver	Constructor	Laps	Time/Retired	Grid	Points
1	5	(Australia) Jack Brabham	Brabham-Repco	80	2:13:13.4	1	9
2	6	(New Zealand) Denny Hulme	Brabham-Repco	80	+ 9.6	2	6
3	3	(United Kingdom) Graham Hill	BRM	79	+ 1 lap	4	4
4	1	(United Kingdom) Jim Clark	Lotus-Climax	79	+ 1 lap	5	3
5	11	(Austria) Jochen Rindt	Cooper-Maserati	79	+ 1 lap	7	2
6	14	(New Zealand) Bruce McLaren	McLaren-Serenissima	78	+ 2 laps	13	1
7	7	(United Kingdom) Chris Irwin	Brabham-Climax	78	+ 2 laps	12	
8	22	(United Kingdom) John Taylor	Brabham-BRM	76	+ 4 laps	16	
9	25	(United States) Bob Bondurant	BRM	76	+ 4 laps	14	
10	19	(France) Guy Ligier	Cooper-Maserati	75	+ 5 laps	17	
11	24	(United Kingdom) Chris Lawrence	Cooper-Ferrari	73	+ 7 laps	19	
NC	21	(United Kingdom) Bob Anderson	Brabham-Climax	70	+ 10 laps	10	
NC	20	(Switzerland) Jo Siffert	Cooper-Maserati	70	+ 10 laps	11	
Ret	12	(United Kingdom) John Surtees	Cooper-Maserati	67	Transmission	6	
Ret	18	(Sweden) Jo Bonnier	Brabham-Climax	42	Clutch	15	
Ret	2	(United Kingdom) Peter Arundell	Lotus-BRM	32	Gearbox	20	
Ret	4	(United Kingdom) Jackie Stewart	BRM	17	Engine	8	
Ret	17	(United Kingdom) Mike Spence	Lotus-BRM	15	Oil leak	9	
Ret	16	(United States) Dan Gurney	Eagle-Climax	9	Engine	3	
Ret	23	(United Kingdom) Trevor Taylor	Shannon-Climax	0	Engine	18	

== Notes ==
- This was the Formula One World Championship debut race for British drivers Chris Irwin and Chris Lawrence.
- This was the Formula One World Championship debut for British constructor Shannon.
- This was the 100th race for a Cooper. In those 100 races, Cooper had won 14 Grands Prix, achieved 49 podium finishes, 10 pole positions, 12 fastest laps, 2 Grand Slams and had won 2 Driver's and 2 Constructor's World Championships.

== Championship standings after the race ==
Drivers' Championship standings

	Pos	Driver	Points
	1	(Australia) Jack Brabham	21
3	2	(Austria) Jochen Rindt	11
5	3	(New Zealand) Denny Hulme	10
2	4	(Italy) Lorenzo Bandini	10
2	5	(United Kingdom) John Surtees	9

Constructors' Championship standings

	Pos	Constructor	Points
1	1	(United Kingdom) Brabham-Repco	21
1	2	(Italy) Ferrari	21
	3	(United Kingdom) BRM	13
	4	(United Kingdom) Cooper-Maserati	11
1	5	(United Kingdom) Lotus-Climax	3

- Notes: Only the top five positions are included for both sets of standings.

Previous race: 1966 French Grand Prix	FIA Formula One World Championship; 1966 season	Next race: 1966 Dutch Grand Prix
Previous race: 1965 British Grand Prix	British Grand Prix	Next race: 1967 British Grand Prix
