= Waverley Cars =

British automobile manufacturer

Waverley Cars Limited of Willesden, London were a manufacturer of motor cars from 1910 to c. 1930.

== Company History ==
The company started out as Light Cars Limited in Willesden, North London in 1910. Their first model, named the Waverley, was exhibited on the stand of T.B.Andre Ltd on their stand at the 1910 Motor Show. They also exhibited on T.B.Andre's stand in 1911, but had their own stand at the 1912 show. Light Cars Ltd had showrooms at 119 Great Portland Street, London.

Production recommenced in 1919 by which time the company had changed its name to Waverley Cars Ltd. They last exhibited at Olympia in 1927, and production probably ceased in 1928.

== Pre WW1 Models ==
The Waverley name was used from the outset, and the car described as a distinctive 4-cylinder car of British design with unique suspension. These early cars used Chapuis-Dornier engines. At the 1912 Olympia show they listed two models, the 10 hp and the 12 hp, although both models at the show were the 12 hp, this having an engine with a bore of 75mm and stroke of 120mm, with inlet over exhaust layout. The unusual rear suspension was a feature of the car, and comprised two quarter-elliptic springs on either side spaced about 4 inches apart.

At the 1913 Olympia show there were 3 models, the 10 hp with four cylinder motor of 65mm bore and 130mm stroke, the 12 hp with 75mm bore and 120mm stroke, and a new high power option with an engine of 69.5mm bore and 120mm stroke. Also added to their range was a 'Colonial type' fitted with 32in Sankey wheels, and two light delivery vans of 10cwt and 14cwt load capacity.

== Post WW1 Models ==
After the war Waverley Cars reappeared in 1919 fitted with Smith's starting and lighting system, and they changed their power unit to a Coventry-Simplex engine. In 1923 they announced that for 1924 they would offer a 1500cc Burt-McCollum sleeve-valve engine as an alternative to the 1500cc Coventry-Simplex engine, they also offered either 2-wheel or 4-wheel brakes. At the 1924 show another new engine was revealed, the new 6-cylinder Coventry Climax engine of 1990cc. These 16/50 models largely with bodywork by the Carlton Carriage Company were to be the mainstay of production, though the company did try the sleeve-valve engine again in 1926, and also tried a car with a rear mounted flat-four engine.

In 1926 Waverley Cars attracted a lot of publicity as one of a few car manufacturers stating they would bring a car to the market for just £100. At the 1926 Olympia show they revealed their £100 car, a 7 hp car with an opposed twin cylinder water cooled engine and a four-seater body. The other manufacturers' cars at the show hitting the £100 target were the 8 hp Gillet, and the 10 hp Seaton-Petter, while outside the show a 7 hp Lafitte car was on show giving demonstrations, this also priced at £100. Unfortunately the thousands of orders received did not result in thousands of satisfied customers either from Gillet or Waverley - in the case of Waverley they had relied on a third-party manufacturer in part and the fixed price contract fell through, and in addition the required works expansion fell through. They stated that they would not show the £100 car at the 1927 Olympia Show unless it was in full production. In the end it was not an economic proposition.
