= Shannon Racing Cars =

British Formula One constructor

Shannon Racing Cars as a Formula One chassis constructor
- Base: UK
- Founder(s): Paul Emery; Aiden Jones

Formula One World Championship career
- Engines: Coventry Climax
- First entry: 1966 British Grand Prix
- Last entry: 1966 British Grand Prix
- Races entered: 1
- Race victories: 0
- Constructors' Championships: 0
- Drivers' Championships: 0
- Pole positions: 0
- Fastest laps: 0

Shannon Racing Cars was a Formula One constructor from the United Kingdom with Aiden Jones, formerly a mechanic for Prince Bira and Prince Chula, and Paul Emery as the principals. Using a car built by former Emeryson designer Emery and an old Coventry Climax engine, they participated in a single Grand Prix. Trevor Taylor drove for the team at the 1966 British Grand Prix, retiring early in the race. The car was then used for Formula 3 until 1969.

== SH1 ==
The only F1 chassis Shannon Racing Cars made had steel monocoque frame, upper and lower wishbone front suspension with outboard brake, and anti-roll bar. It was a very compact design with an upper I arm and lower reversed A arm with upper and lower radius arms mated with an outboard spring/damper unit, outboard brake, and anti-roll bar in the rear. The rear arm of the front upper A arm was much thicker than the front tube, acting as a canti-lever to operate the inboard spring/damper unit mounted vertically. The monocoque extended to the rear of the engine, with the gearbox sticking out further aft. Another monocoque tub was made in aluminium, but was never used.

The Coventry Climax 2.5-litre FPE Godiva V8 engine used in the Shannon had been built 12 years earlier in 1954 for Kieft F1, but was not released for a lack of proper fuel injection. The entire stock of parts was sold to Andrew Getley, who permitted Paul Emery to convert one unit to the 1966 3-litre F1 format, which required it to run on pump fuel as opposed to the original alcohol.

Paul Emery bored out the engine, used a Tecalemit Jackson fuel injection, and the 2-valve gear-driven DOHC 3-litre crossplane V8 made 312 bhp at Chrysler's dynamometer located in Kew.

The SH1 arrived at Brands Hatch with Syd Fox as the driver, who drove on the practice day. Pannier fuel tanks were installed overnight to cope with the fuel consumption of the 3-litre engine. However, the decision was made to offer the seat to Trevor Taylor, who qualified and started the race. After one lap, one of the pannier tanks developed a leak, and the car was retired.

A petrol company sponsorship was promised but fell through, and SH1 received a 1-litre Cosworth MAE built by Holbay (later by EMC Motorsport), fitted with two twin-choke diagonal throat sand-cast Weber carburettors for Formula 3 racing. This car participated in many F3 races in the hands of John Wilson and Keith Jupp until 1969. Wilson later recalled the car handled better than the competition that had two or three years newer designs.

The subsequent owner of SH1 obtained a Climax FPE from Gordon Chapman, then owner of the FPE parts, and the car and the engine are said to be in Austria with Mr. Burkhardt List along with a collection of Emeryson racing cars.

== Complete Formula One results ==
(key)

Year	Chassis	Engine(s)	Tyres	Drivers	1	2	3	4	5	6	7	8	9	Points	WCC
1966	Shannon SH1	Climax FPE V8	D		MON	BEL	FRA	GBR	NED	GER	ITA	USA	MEX	0	NC
1966	Shannon SH1	Climax FPE V8	D	(United Kingdom) Trevor Taylor				Ret						0	NC
