= Coventry Climax =

British forklift truck, fire pump, and speciality engine manufacturer

- Type: Limited company
- Industry: Speciality machinery and engine manufacture
- Predecessor: Johnson & Smith Ltd.
- Founded: 1903
- Defunct: 1986 (Coventry Climax Holdings Ltd)
- Fate: Purchased by Jaguar Cars, businesses merged by British Leyland or divested
- Successor: Kalmar Climax (forklift business)
- Headquarters: Coventry
- Key people: Lee Stroyer, Henry Pelham Lee, Leonard Pelham Lee; Walter Hassan, Harry Mundy, Peter Windsor Smith

Coventry Climax as a Formula One engine manufacturer
Formula One World Championship career
- First entry: 1957 Monaco Grand Prix
- Last entry: 1969 Canadian Grand Prix
- Races entered: 97 (96 starts)
- Chassis: Cooper, Lotus, Fry, BRM, JBW, Ferguson, Gilby, Emeryson, Lola, Brabham, Scirocco, LDS, Eagle, Shannon
- Constructors' Championships: 4 (1959, 1960, 1963, 1965)
- Drivers' Championships: 4 (1959, 1960, 1963, 1965)
- Race victories: 40
- Podiums: 104
- Points: 684
- Pole positions: 44
- Fastest laps: 44

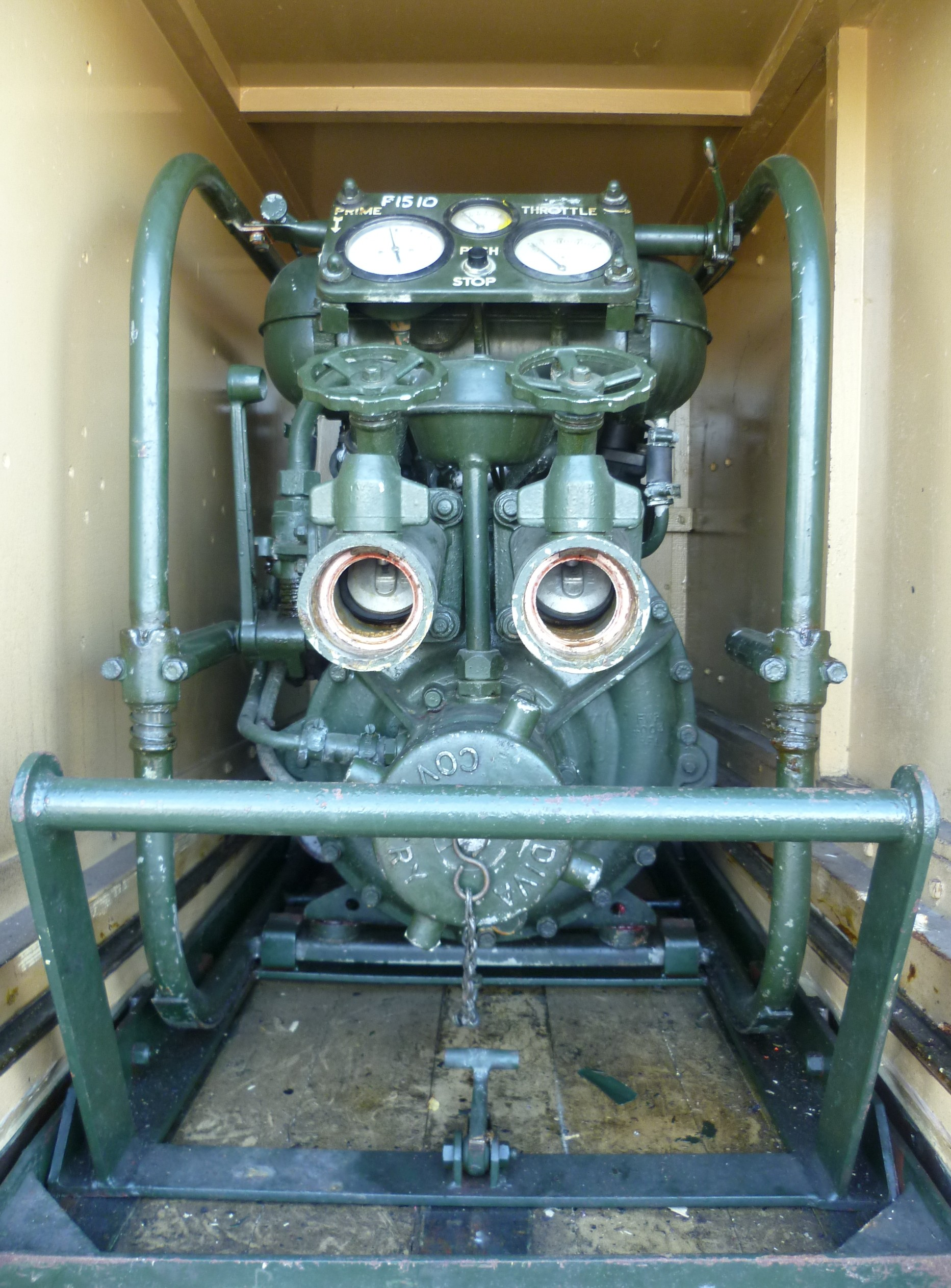
Coventry Climax Godiva fire pump in a Green Goddess

Coventry Climax was a British manufacturer of forklift trucks, fire pumps, racing engines, and other speciality engines.

== History ==
=== Pre WWI ===
The company was started in 1903 as Lee Stroyer, a joint venture by Jens Stroyer and Horace Pelham Lee, a former Daimler employee, who saw an opportunity in the nascent internal combustion engine market. In 1905, following the departure of Stroyer, it was relocated to Paynes Lane, Coventry, and renamed as Coventry Simplex by Lee.

An early user was GWK, who produced over 1,000 light cars with Coventry-Simplex two-cylinder engines between 1911 and 1915. Just before the First World War, a Coventry-Simplex engine was used by Lionel Martin to power the first Aston Martin car. Ernest Shackleton selected Coventry-Simplex to power the tractors that were to be used in his Imperial Trans-Antarctic Expedition of 1914.

Hundreds of Coventry-Simplex engines were manufactured during the First World War to be used in generator sets for searchlights.

=== Post WWI ===
In 1919, Pelham Lee acquired an existing company, Johnson & Smith Ltd, and changed its name to Coventry Climax Engines Ltd with premises at East Street, Coventry. (Coventry Simplex continued under separate management).

Throughout the 1920s and 1930s, the company supplied engines to many companies manufacturing light cars such as Abbey, AJS, Albatross, Ashton-Evans, Bayliss-Thomas, Clyno, Crossley, Crouch, GWK, Marendaz, Morgan, Triumph, Swift, Standard, and Waverley Cars of London. In the early 1930s, the company also supplied engines for buses, and in 1935 supplied the 'L' engine to David Brown tractors for the 550 Model A, being a collaborative venture with Ferguson. In the 1920s, the company moved to Friars Road, Coventry, and in the late 1930s, they also acquired the former Riley premises on Widdrington Road, Coventry.

With the closure of Swift in 1931, the company was left with a stock of engines that were converted to drive electric generators, a field in which they had experience from building WW1 searchlight generators. They also started to make engine driven pumps, and mounted on a trailer as a mobile fire fighting appliance this was to be a great success. The economic problems of the 1930s hit the business hard, and Leonard Pelham Lee, who had taken over from his father, created a separate division of the company for the fire pumps. While the motor car engine business suffered during the recession, the mobile fire pump division of Coventry Climax became a great success, particularly during the late 1930s and this continued during the war.

Another diversification was into commercial vehicle engines. This started in 1929 with the launch of a large (5.8 litre) six-cylinder side-valve petrol engine intended for buses and trucks, and was followed in 1931 by a six-cylindered 6.8 litre petrol engine of inlet over exhaust (IOE) design, and a 4-cylinder engine in 1932. In 1934 Commercial Motor referred to the 'popular Coventry Climax engines' as the six-cylindered L6 and the four-cylindered B4 – the latter being of 'especially modern design with wet liners'. Examples of vehicles using the engines include the 1932 Karrier Bantam refuse truck, and the 1935 Gilford Motors CF176 coach.

Going into the war, Coventry Climax used their marine diesel experience to further develop and build the Armstrong Whitworth supercharged H30 multifuel engine for military use. This has been fitted as an auxiliary engine in the British Chieftain and Challenger battle tanks and Rapier anti-aircraft missile systems.

=== Post WWII ===
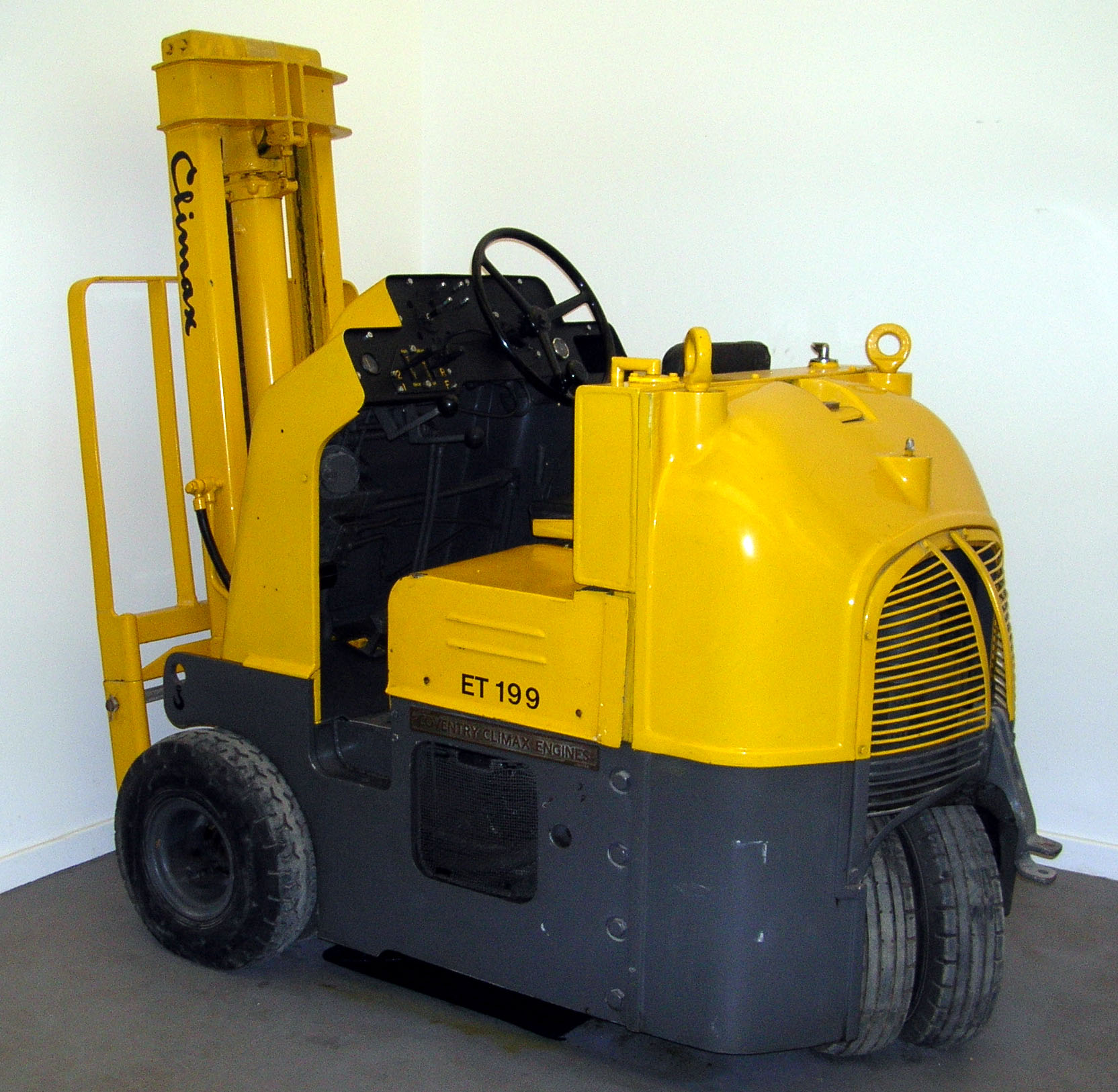
Coventry Climax ET 199 (1949 model)

In the late 1940s, the company shifted away from automobile engines and into other markets, including marine diesels, and forklift trucks – plus continuing to make their very successful fire pumps. In 1946, the ET199 forklift was announced, which the company claimed was the first British-produced forklift truck. The ET199 was designed to carry a 4,000 lb (1,800 kg) load with a 24-inch (610 mm) load centre, and with a 9 ft (2.7 m) lift height.

In 1950, Harry Mundy joined Coventry Climax, and a new lightweight all-aluminium overhead camshaft engine was developed in response to the government's ambitious requisition outline asking for a portable fire pump that was capable of pumping double the amount of water specified in the previous outline, with half the weight.

This was designated the FW for "Feather Weight". The engine was displayed at the Motor Show in London and attracted attention from the motor racing fraternity for its very high "horsepower per pound of weight". With strong persuasions at the show, including those by Cyril Kieft (who had Stirling Moss as an F3 driver) and a young Colin Chapman, Lee concluded that success in competition could lead to more customers for the company, and so the team designed the FWA, a Feather Weight engine for Automobiles.

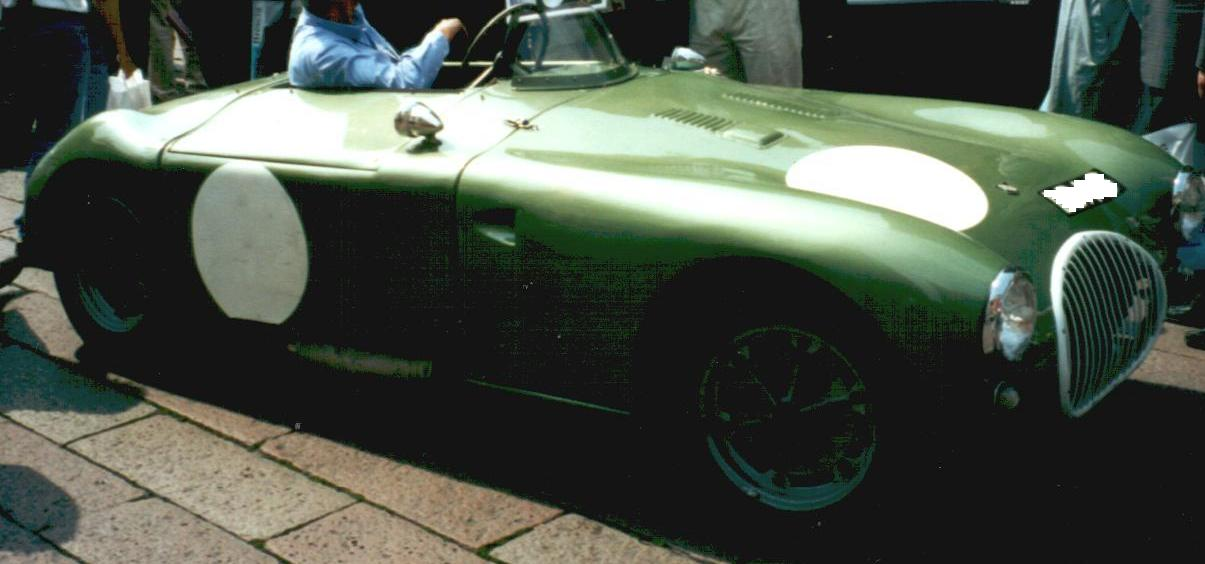
Kieft 1100 at 1954 24 Hours of Le Mans

The first Coventry Climax racing engine appeared at the 1954 24 Hours of Le Mans in the front of one of two Kieft 1100 sports racers, but both cars (one with an MG engine) failed to finish the race due to problems unrelated to the engines. The FWA became popular in sportscar racing and was followed by the Mark II and then by the FWB, which had a capacity of nearly 1.5-litres. The new Formula Two regulations suited the 1.5-litre engine, and it quickly became the engine to have in F2 racing. By 1957, the first Climax engines began to appear in Formula One in the back of Cooper chassis.

Initially, these were FWBs, but the FPF engine followed. Stirling Moss scored the company's first Formula One victory in Argentina in 1958, using a 2-litre version of the engine. In general terms, however, the engines were not powerful enough to compete with the 2.5-litre machinery, and it was not until the 2.5-litre version of the FPF arrived in 1959 that Jack Brabham was able to win the world championship in a Cooper-Climax. At the same time, the company produced the FWE engine for the Lotus Elite, and this enjoyed considerable success in sports car racing, with a series of class wins at the Le Mans events in the early 1960s.

In 1961, there was a new 1.5-litre formula, and the FPF engine was given a new lease on life, although the company began work on a V8 engine, designated the FWMV, and this became competitive in 1962 predominantly in Lotus, Cooper, Brabham, and Lola chassis, with Jim Clark's Lotus outstandingly the most successful. There were a total of 22 Grand Prix victories before 1966 with crossplane, flat-plane, two- and four-valve versions of the FWMV. When the new, 3-litre, formula was introduced, Coventry Climax decided not to build engines for the new formula and withdrew from racing after the unsuccessful FWMW project, with the exception of the new 2-Litre version of the FWMV.

Also, in the early 1960s, Coventry Climax was approached by Rootes to mass-produce FWMAs for use in a compact family car project called Apex with an all-aluminium alloy overhead cam engine combined with a full-synchromesh aluminium transaxle. This combination was considered very radical at the time, especially the synchromesh on all forward gears, which had been declared 'impossible' by Alec Issigonis of BMC Mini fame. The adoption to mass-production was successful, and the project came out to the market as the 875cc Hillman Imp totaling over 400,000 units made by 1976, including the later 998cc version.

=== Final years ===
At Earls Court in 1962, Coventry Climax chairman, Leonard Pelham Lee announced the withdrawal from building Formula 1 engines, stating that the company was losing money and not gaining enough publicity from their involvement. Nonetheless, Coventry Climax remained in Formula One until they were unable to come up with a new engine for the three-litre formula. The company was purchased by Jaguar Cars in 1963, which itself merged with the British Motor Corporation (BMC) in 1966 to form British Motor Holdings (BMH).

In May 1964, the Royal Automobile Club presented the Dewar Trophy, which is given at the recommendation of RAC's Technical and Engineering Committee for the most outstanding British achievement in the automotive field, to Leonard Pelham Lee. The citation reads: "Awarded to Coventry Climax Engines Ltd. for the design, development, and production of engines which have brought British cars to the forefront in the field of Grand Prix racing." The history of this trophy dates back to 1906. The last time the Dewar Trophy was awarded before 1964, the recipient was Alec Issigonis for British Motor Corporation (BMC) in 1959 on the design and production of the ADO15 Mini.

BMH merged with the Leyland Motor Corporation in 1968 to form the British Leyland Motor Corporation, which was then nationalised in 1975 as British Leyland (BL). Coventry Climax became part of the British Leyland Special Products Division, alongside Alvis, Aveling-Barford, and others. At the end of 1978, BL brought together Coventry Climax Limited, Leyland Vehicles Limited (trucks, buses, and tractors), Alvis Limited (military vehicles), and Self-Changing Gears Limited (heavy-duty transmissions) into a new group called BL Commercial Vehicles (BLCV) under managing director David Abell.

In the early 1970s, the fire pump business was sold back into private ownership, and the Godiva Fire Pumps company was formed in Warwick. In 1977 Coventry Climax acquired the Warrington forklift truck business of Rubery Owen Conveyancer, renaming it Climax Conveyancer.

In 1982 BL sold off the Coventry Climax forklift truck business back into private ownership to Coventry Climax Holdings Limited. Sir Emmanuel Kaye, also chairman and a major shareholder of Lansing Bagnall at the time, formed the company, independent of his other interests for the purpose of acquiring Coventry Climax.

In 1986 Coventry Climax went into receivership and was acquired by Cronin Tubular. In 1990, a further change of ownership came with the engine business being sold to Horstman Defence Systems of Bath, Somerset, thus breaking the link with Coventry. Kalmar Industries acquired the forklift truck interests of Coventry Climax in 1985. The company traded as "Kalmar Climax" for a few years but is now trading as Kalmar Industries Ltd. The 'Coventry Climax logo trademark is the property of Canadian Peter Schömer, based in Chichester.

== Engines ==
=== Design ===
Within the complicated corporate lineage, the reputation of Coventry Climax as a top-rate engine designer-builder is largely credited to Walter Hassan and Harry Mundy, who designed and developed the FW together. The following design aspects are credited to these two people, except the last two items, in which Peter Windsor Smith played a considerable role in place of Mundy, who left the firm in 1955 and returned in 1963.

- Designed as a fire engine component, one unique requirement the Feather Weight fulfilled was the ability to be run at nearly full-throttle without a proper warm-up. This required careful attention to lubrication and thermal expansion rates on its parts, which translated into legendary durability in rough racing environments at the price of high oil consumption.
- Another technical significance of the FW series, which was carried over to the FWM, is an interpretation of Harry Ricardo's intake turbulence theory, whereby intake and exhaust valves are tilted to the same side of the engine where the intake and exhaust ports are located. In the SOHC reverse-flow cylinder head design, where valves are actuated directly under the camshaft, and where the intake and exhaust ports are located fore and aft of the cylinder bore centre, this arrangement allows intake and exhaust flows to encourage a swirl in the same rotational direction in the combustion chamber going into and coming out of the cylinder.
- Later crossflow DOHC FPF designs incorporated the same concept in a completely different arrangement, where the tracts in the intake manifold are connected to the intake ports in a staggered manner, in a somewhat corkscrew fashion, to create the turbulence by the intake flow.
- The FWMV had an unusually small intake valve size to exhaust valve size ratio for an increased intake flow speed at the valve opening for the same reason. At one time, the FWMV's exhaust valve size (1.37") exceeded the inlet valve size (1.35") on the most successful Mk.4 version.
- Separately, the FWMV Mk.III and Mk.4 became famous for proving that flatplane crankshaft design is more advantageous for a racing V8 than a crossplane, in spite of the engineering theories at the time suggesting otherwise. Flatplane crankshafts became the norm in V8 racing engine designs from the 1970s on.

=== F Type ===
At the Olympia Motor Show in 1923, Coventry Climax listed four F-type 4-cylinder water cooled engines. All had 100 mm stroke, and the bores were 59 (1,094 cc displacement), 63 (1,247 cc), 66 (1,368 cc) and 69 mm (1,496 cc). The GWK car had featured in Coventry Climax adverts from late 1920 with a Coventry Climax 10.8 hp 4-cylinder engine, the same horsepower rating as the 66 mm bore F type. The engines were available either separate or in unit construction with a three speed gearbox.

=== ET 2 ===
Also displayed at the 1923 Olympia Motor Show was a 1,005 cc twin cylinder 2-stroke engine. The bore was 80 mm and the stroke 85 mm.

=== CX ===
The main engine of interest at the 1923 show was the new 6-cylinder 1,753 cc CX engine. This had 61 mm bore and 100 mm stroke, and was rated at 13.8 hp. The same six-cylinder engine appeared in the Waverley car at the 1925 Olympia motor show. The engine size had increased to 1,991 cc (65 mm bore, 16 hp rating), with overhead valves and Lanchester style vibration damper, it was coupled to a 4-speed Meadows gearbox.

=== OC ===
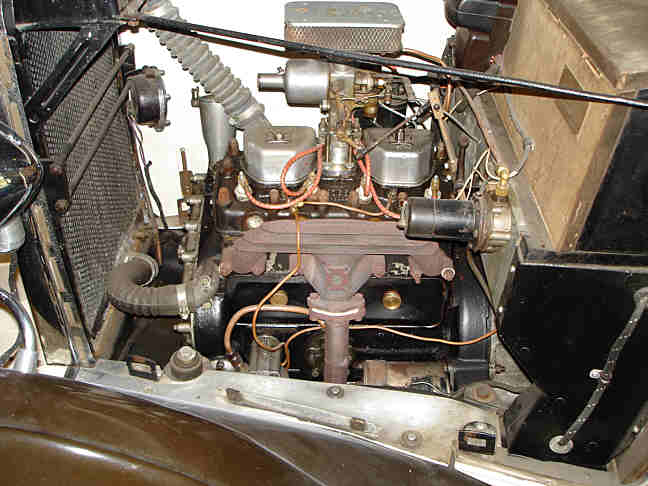
Type OC engine in a Crossley 10 hp

At first, the OC was made with a capacity of 1,122 cc as a straight-four using a bore of 63 mm and stroke of 90 mm with overhead inlet and side exhaust valves, producing 34 bhp (25 kW). It was introduced in the early 1930s and also built under licence by Triumph.

=== MC ===
The OC engine had morphed into the MC engine by 1933. It looked virtually identical, but there were internal differences. It was still 1,122 cc, I.O.E., and four cylinders inline, but the camshaft was different, as were the cam followers. The timing marks on the flywheel are now observed from the top of the engine rather than the underside as on the OC. Carburation varied, from the side draught Solex, the down draught SU, to the progressive choke down draught and then a larger side draught SU system on Triumph engines. The engine was water-cooled by thermosyphon with no water pump or fan.

=== JM ===
A six-cylinder version of the MC engine, the JM, was made with a capacity of 1,476 cc with a 59 mm bore, developing 42 bhp (31 kW). The JMC version had its capacity increased to 1,683 cc by increasing the bore to 63 mm and produced 48 bhp (36 kW). It was different from the 4 cylinder engine in that it had both a water pump and an oil filter, whereas the 4 cylinder engine relied on thermosyphon alone and no oil filter.

=== FW ===
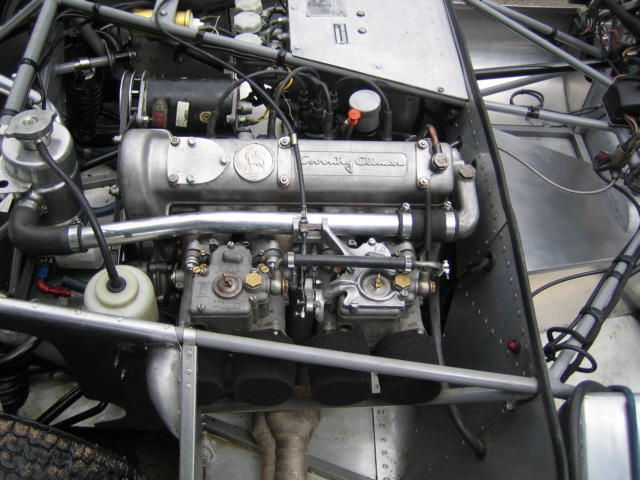
1,098cc FWA installed in a Lotus 17

The FW 38 hp 1,020 cc straight-four SOHC was designed by Hassan and Mundy as the motive unit for a portable service fire pump which was supplied to the government under three contracts totaling over 150,000 units. This engine was revolutionary in its lightness, with a bare weight of 180 pounds, combined with the maintenance-free valve adjustment using shims under an overhead camshaft.

In 1953 it was adapted for automotive racing as the 1,098 cc FWA retaining the cast crank three main bearing construction of the FW but with a distributor ignition in place of a magneto, a different camshaft, and a higher, 9.8:1 compression ratio. With a bore of 2.85 inches and a stroke of 2.625 inches, it produced 71 hp (53 kW) at 6,000 rpm and was first used at Le Mans in 1954 by Kieft Cars. After the FWA was introduced, the FW was renamed to FWP (Pump).

The larger bore (3 inches) and longer stroke (3.15 inches) 1,460 cc FWB engine followed; it retained the FWA head but had a forged steel crank and produced a nominal 108 bhp (81 kW). In 1966–67, Fisher-Pierce of America imported an 85 hp version of the FWB with twin-carburetors to be mounted vertically in their outboard marine unit. This outboard boat engine came out to the market as Bearcat 85.

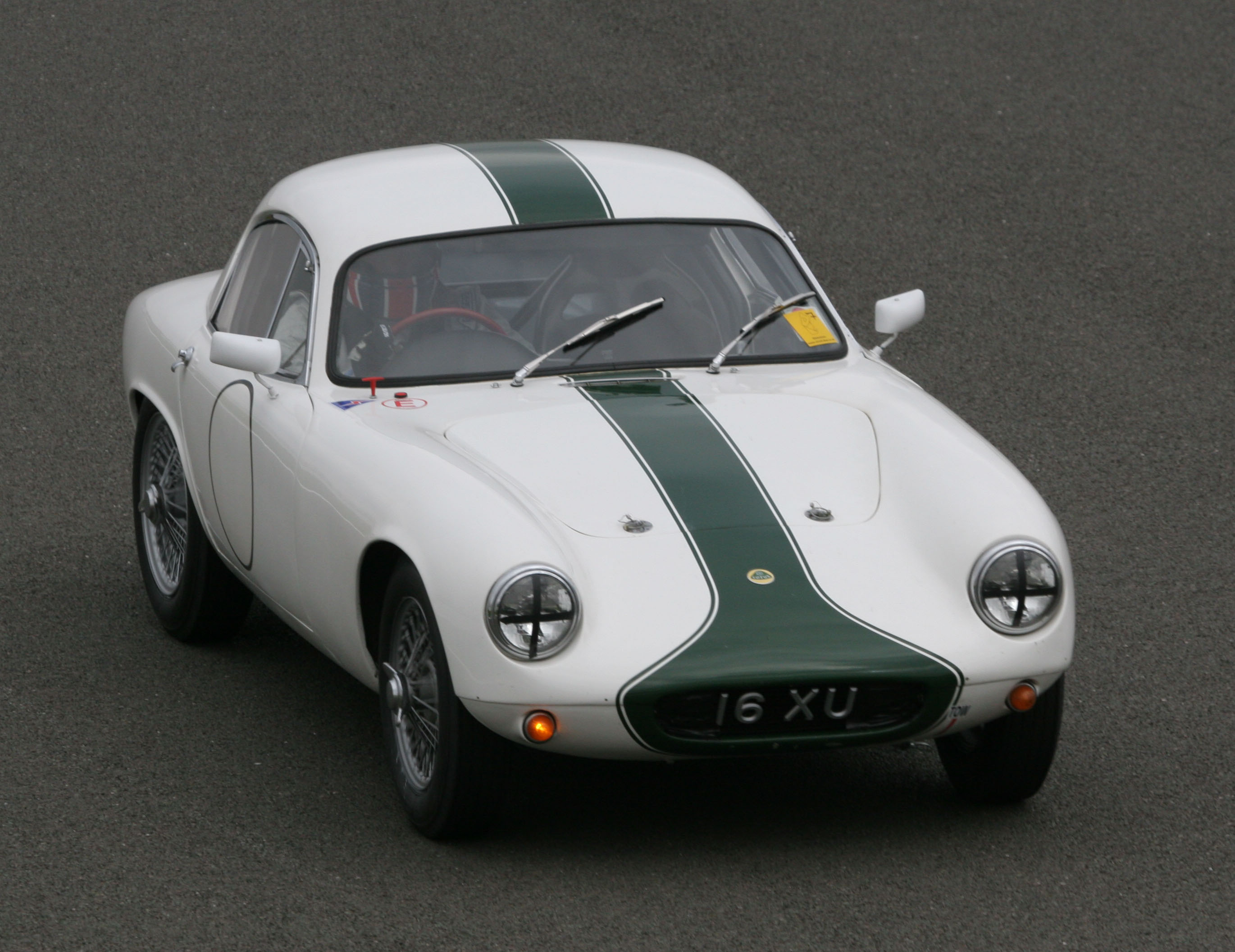
Lotus Elite for which the FWE (E for Elite) was developed

The most significant of the series was the FWE which used the FWB bore size and the FWA stroke for a displacement of 1,216 cc. In exchange for a 1,000 unit purchase agreement signed by Chapman, it was specifically designed for the Lotus Elite with forged steel crank but became a favourite with a number of sports car racing firms for its racing durability and high power-to-weight ratio.

- FWE Stage I – 10:1 compression ratio, single 1-1/2" SU H4 carburetor on cast iron intake and exhaust manifold, 75 bhp at 6100rpm
- FWE Stage II – Dual 1-1/2" SU H4 carburetors on alloy manifold, standard on Series 2 Elite, 80 bhp at 6100rpm
- FWE Stage III (Super 95) – 10.5:1 compression ratio, dual twin-choke Weber 40DCOE, 95 bhp at 7000rpm
- FWE Super 100 – Five-bearing high lift camshaft, steel timing gear, ported head, 100 bhp
- FWE Super 105 – 11:1 compression ratio, racing (tuned steel tubular, rather than cast) exhaust manifold, 105 bhp

The FWE powered Lotus Elites won their class six times and the Index of Thermal Efficiency once during the 24 Hours of Le Mans. The FW series engines in modified forms also powered Lotus Eleven cars which took three class wins at Le Mans and one Index of Performance win.

Other FW variants included a short-stroke (1.78 inches) steel crank version of the FWA named the 744 cc FWC, as used by Dan Gurney early in his career in US club racing. The objective of this engine was for Lotus to campaign for the 750 cc Le Mans Index of Performance prize in 1957, three engines were made for this purpose, and it won the prize in a Lotus Eleven driven by Cliff Allison and Keith Hall. Lotus also campaigned the FWC at Le Mans in 1958. Another variant was the 998 cc FWG, which was designed to the 1,000 cc FIA Formula Two rules, also with a steel crankshaft to produce just shy of 100 bhp at 9,000 rpm.

=== FPE (the 'Godiva') ===
Commission Sportive Internationale announced in 1952 that 2.5L naturally aspirated engines would be a part of Formula One regulation starting 1954. Walter Hassan and especially Harry Mundy having their roots deeply in the racing field, started discussions and preliminary designs of a 2.5L 8 Cylinder GP engine in 1952 without a formal directive from the father and son Pelham Lees. Because this project was a pure racing engine from the beginning, which was in stark contrast to the corporate product history up to FWA, the engine was named FPE for Fire Pump Engine (Eight according to another lore) by the playful minds of Hassan and Mundy.

After the corporate blessing was given to the project with the name 'Godiva', this DOHC, 90-degree, steel crossplane crank V8 engine was built in 1954 for an F1 Kieft with the intention to use the fuel injection system made by Skinners Union (SU).

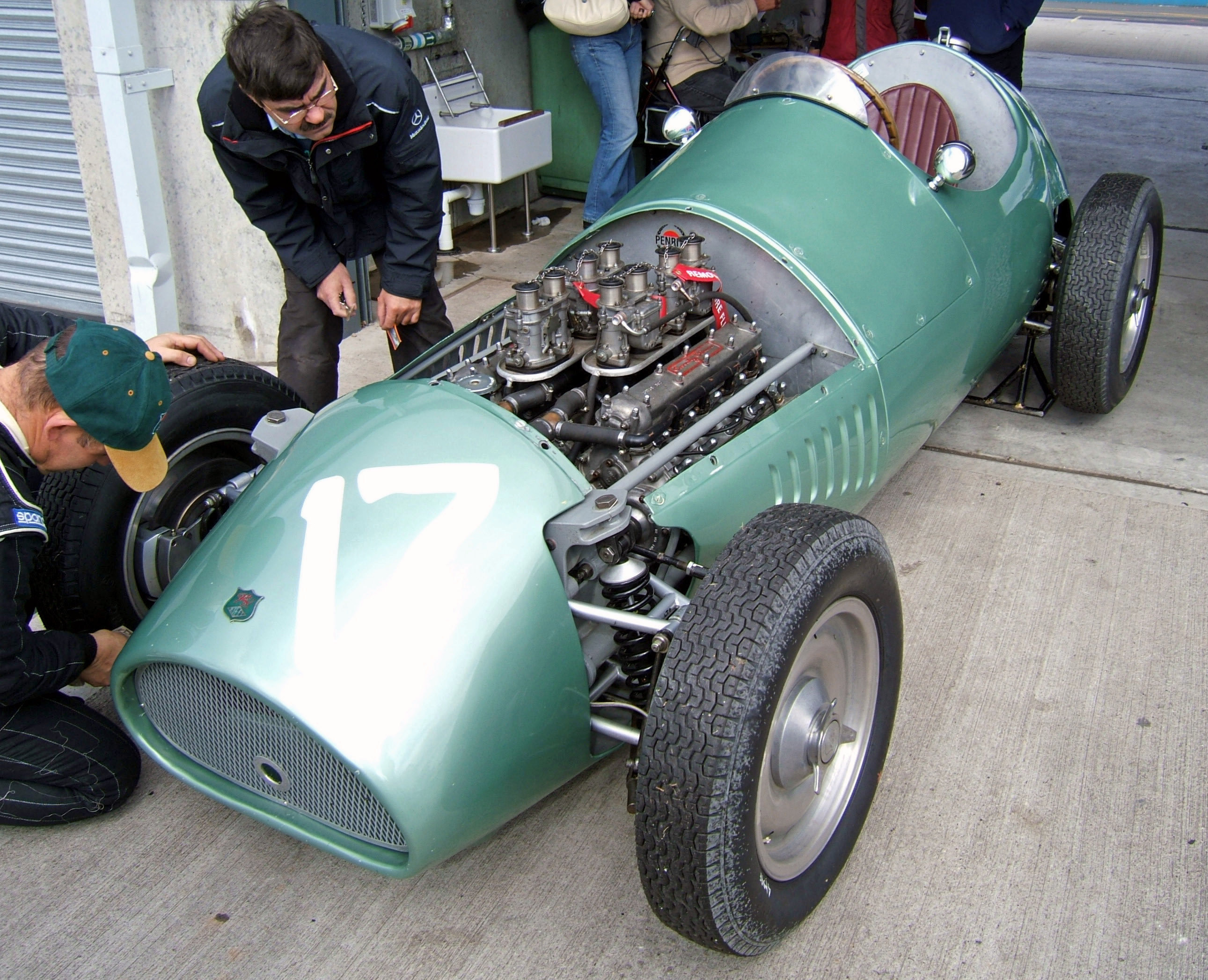
2.5L FPE Godiva with Weber Carburetors finally installed in the original 1954 Kieft chassis after being separated for 48 years.

However, this fuel injection system, designed for aeroplane engines, was found not to have the means to enrich the mixture for acceleration, which is not suitable for automobile use. FPE initially showed 240 bhp using Weber carburettors, but the press at the time reported the rumoured fuel-injected Mercedes 2.5L GP engine is quoted as producing more than 300 bhp, and a corporate decision was made not to release FPE to Kieft in light of the lack of proper fuel injection, leaving the Kieft F1 project, as well as other prospective users, HWM and Connaught, high and dry.

There were reports to the effect that the engine was not run because of fears about the rumoured power of other 2.5L GP engines, but shortly after, John Cooper brought a race-winning, works Maserati F1 engine he had on loan into Coventry Climax, where it produced 225 bhp running on the same dynamometer upon which the FPE had made 264 bhp after some development.

Ultimately, development on the engine was abandoned in favour of focusing on the FPF engine, which was already proven competitive in 1.5L form with side-draft Weber carburetors in the F2 races, and the entire stock of parts was sold to Andrew Getley in the mid-1960s. When the Formula One regulation changed to 3 Litres for 1966, Mr. Getley permitted Paul Emery to rebuild one FPE to 3 Litre format and fit it into a one-off Shannon steel monocoque chassis to make the Shannon F1 car named SH1 driven by Trevor Taylor at 1966 British Grand Prix. Bored out to 3 Litres and Tecalemit Jackson fuel injection installed, this Emery-built FPE produced 312 bhp on the dynamometer at Chrysler's Kew facility.

Remnants of other FPE parts were much later found by the then-owner of 1954 Kieft F1 chassis, Gordon and Martyn Chapman, in an air-raid cellar in the abandoned building which used to belong to Bill Lacey (of Power Engines Ltd., a Coventry Climax specialist) near the main entrance of Silverstone Circuit, including 3 blocks, 2 cranks, 16 cylinder heads, 20-some cam covers (carriers?), two card boxes full of timing gears and camshafts, which all belonged to "Doc Murfield" who had purchased the parts from Andrew Getley in 1968-69 and had entrusted them to Bill Lacey.

These parts were assembled into two engines under the ownership of Gordon Chapman and then under Bill Morris, who bought the engine parts and the Kieft chassis after Gordon Chapman's death. One engine was sold by Chapman to the then-owner of Shannon SH1, and this FPE is said to be in Austria together with Shannon SH1. Another using two of the later type twin spark plug heads in the stock, was run in the original 1954 Kieft-Climax V8 Grand Prix chassis with downdraft Weber 40IDF carburetors when they were finally mated, and the construction finished on 21 September 2002 at VSCC Silverstone Meeting, and this car was campaigned in VSCC events for the next 10 years.

Four sets of period-correct Weber 40DCNL carburetors were installed on the FPE during the 10 years, and the car, one spare chassis, and the FPE parts were sold in a lot at Bonhams Chichester auction on 15 September 2012 for £185,000.

=== FPF ===
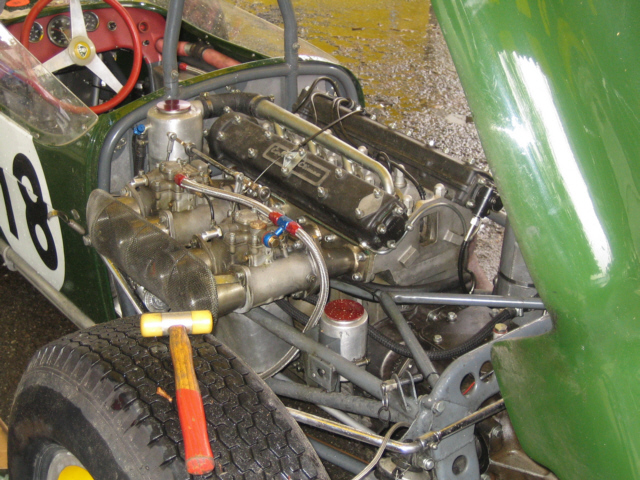
2.5L FPF in Lotus 18

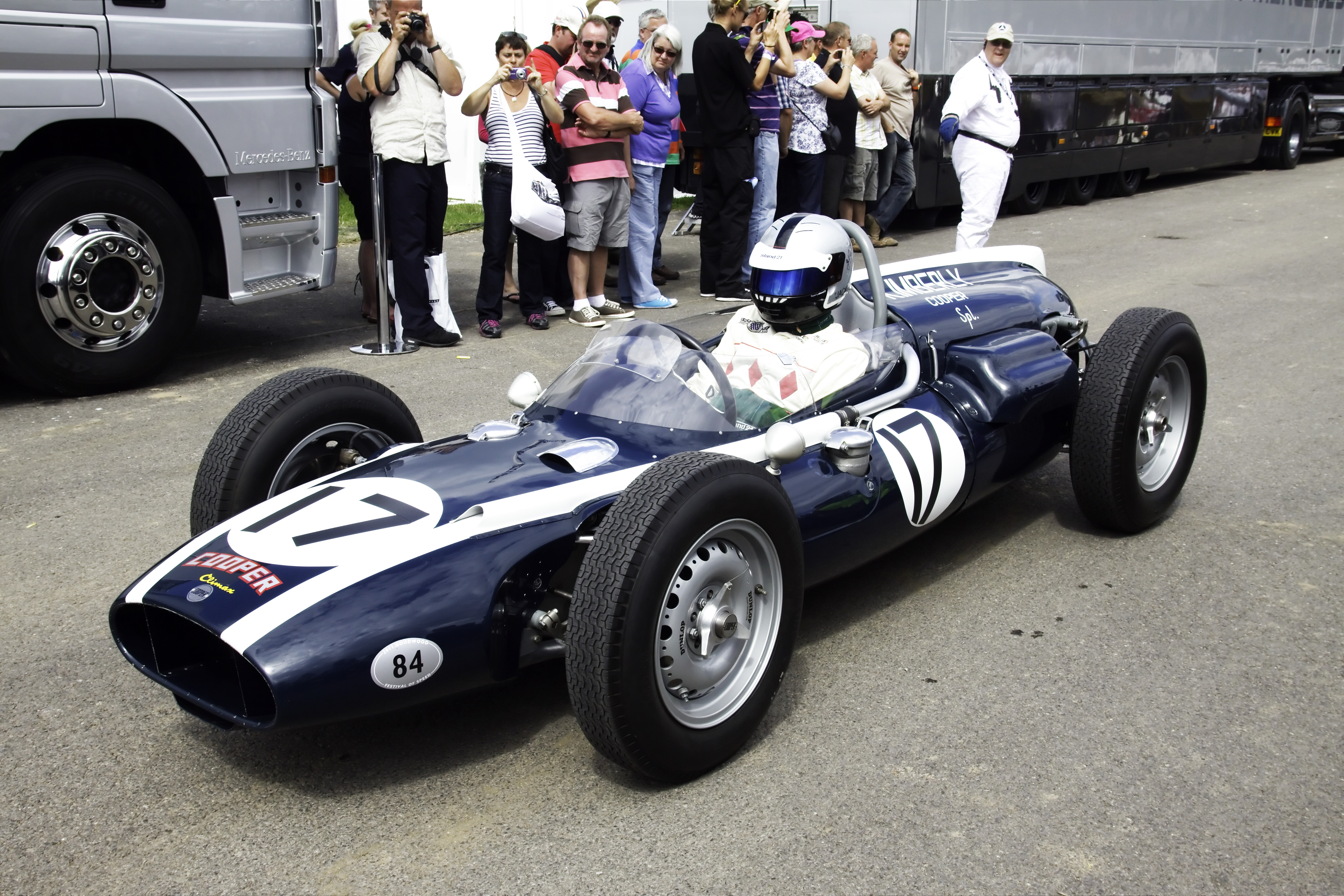
1961 Cooper T54, the first rear-engine Indy car, with 2.75L FPF

The FPF was a double overhead cam all-aluminium four-cylinder that was essentially half of the above FPE V8 engine, which was designed as a pure racing engine from the outset. Designed in 1955 and becoming available in 1956, it had gear-driven camshafts, steel alloy cylinder sleeves, and individual oil scavenge as well as pressure feed pumps for a dry sump system. Carburetion was by two twin-choke Weber DCO side-draft carburettors.

It started life as a 1,475 cc Formula Two engine by enlarging the 2.95 in bore of the FPE to 3.2 in with the slightly increased 2.8 in (71 mm) stroke, and was gradually enlarged for use in Formula One that allowed 2500cc until 1960.

A 1,964 cc (3.4" x 3.3") version took Stirling Moss and Maurice Trintignant to Cooper's first two Grand Prix victories against 2.5 L opposition in 1958. After the interim 2,207 cc (3.5" x 3.5") version, a larger block was cast to result in 2,467 cc (3.7" x 3.5") in 1958, and then to a full-sized 2,497 cc (3.7" x 90 mm (Note: See the FWM Evolution section for the reason for this inches/mm mixed specification.)) in 1960. Jack Brabham won the World Championship of Drivers in both 1959 and 1960 driving FPF powered Coopers.

The FPF with the smaller block was then adopted to the new 1.5-litre Formula One of 1961 as 1,499.8 cc (82 mm x 71 mm) FPF Mk.II and won three World Championship Grand Prix races in that year. In addition, capacity was increased on the larger block to 2,751 cc (96 mm x 95 mm) for the Indianapolis 500 and this variant was also utilised for sports car racing, the Intercontinental Formula and Formula Libre racing.

The 2,497 cc FPF gained a new lease of life in 1964 with the introduction of the Tasman Formula and the Australian National Formula, both of which had a maximum engine capacity of 2.5 litres. It also served as a 2.8L stopgap in the new 3.0 L Formula One regulation, which went into effect in Formula One return to power in 1966.

The 2.5L Coventry Climax FPF engines used in Australia at the time were in fact manufactured under licence by Australian engineering company Repco.

FPF versions
Model	Size	Power	Notes
1956 FPF	1,475 cc 4 cyl 3.20" × 2.80"	141 bhp (105 kW) at 7300 rpm	for F2
1957 FPF	1,964 cc 4 cyl 3.40" × 3.30"	175 bhp (130 kW) at 6500rpm	for F1
1958 FPF	2,207 cc 4 cyl 3.50" × 3.50"		Smaller block
1958 FPF	2,467 cc 4 cyl 3.70" × 3.50"	220 bhp (160 kW) at 6500rpm	Larger block for F1
1960 FPF	2,497 cc 4 cyl 3.70" × 90 mm	239 bhp (180 kW) at 6750rpm.	for F1
1961 FPF	2,751 cc 4 cyl 96 mm × 95 mm		Indianapolis and Formula Libre
1961 FPF Mk.II	1,499.8 cc 4 cyl 82 mm × 71 mm	151 bhp (113 kW) at 7500rpm	for F1

=== FWM ===
The FW was designed in response to the British Government's Ministry of Defence (MoD) requisition outline issued in 1950, specifying a water pump and petrol engine combination to deliver 350 gallons of water per minute at 100 psi, with 35 to 40 bhp at the weight of 350 pounds or less. The successful bid by a portable pump driven by the 38 bhp 4-cylinder FW mounted in a steel pipe frame resulted in a 5000 unit supply contract in 1952.

By 1956, 1,460 cc FWB was adapted back to a higher output fire pump engine as FWBP with good results, and led to the realisation that the newer 35 hp general purpose engine specification by the government (including for Search Lights and Generator Sets) could be met with a smaller displacement engine than the FW(P). This resulted in the development of SOHC 654 cc (2.35" bore x 2.25" stroke) FWM in 1957, which basically was a smaller and lighter version of FWP with many detailed differences that reflect the improvements and cost-cutting as well as weight-saving measures found in the development of FWA, FWB, and FWE. The differences include:

- Deletion of the intermediary shaft (Jackshaft) making the cam drive a single stage chain as opposed to FW series' two stage gear/chain set up. This made the camshaft turn in the same direction as the crank.
- Conrod big end part line was made horizontal, as opposed to the previous diagonal.
- The number of cylinder head studs was reduced from 18 to 10.

==== Evolution ====
FWM was then developed into an automotive engine as FWMA of 742 cc with larger 2.45" bore and 2.4" stroke in 1959. Several versions of FWMD diesel utility engines, including a marine version, followed, and then a chain-driven DOHC 2 valves per cylinder crossflow cylinder head was developed and became the FWMC, succeeding FWC as the all-out racing engine for the 750cc class. FWMC became known for the unusually loud and high-pitched exhaust note when installed in a specially made super-light version of Lotus Elite run by UDT Laystall at 1961 Le Mans 24 Hours. It was this 4-cylinder DOHC FWMC that was used as the basis to develop the successful FWMV V8 engine for the 1.5 litre limit introduced for the 1961 Formula One season.

However, coinciding with the promotion of Peter Windsor Smith as the Chief Engineer (reporting to Walter Hassan) in 1960, Coventry Climax reverted (as in OC and JM engines) to using the metric system for specifying piston and crankshaft sizes, so FWMV cylinder dimensions were 63 mm (2.4803 in) bore and 60 mm (2.3622 in) stroke, ending up having almost no parts interchangeability to FWMC despite having an extremely similar piston and cylinder-head design. To streamline production, the 63 mm × 60 mm sizes were later applied back to the 4 cylinder engine to form the 748 cc FWMB with the same cylinder head as the FWMA.

=== FWMV ===
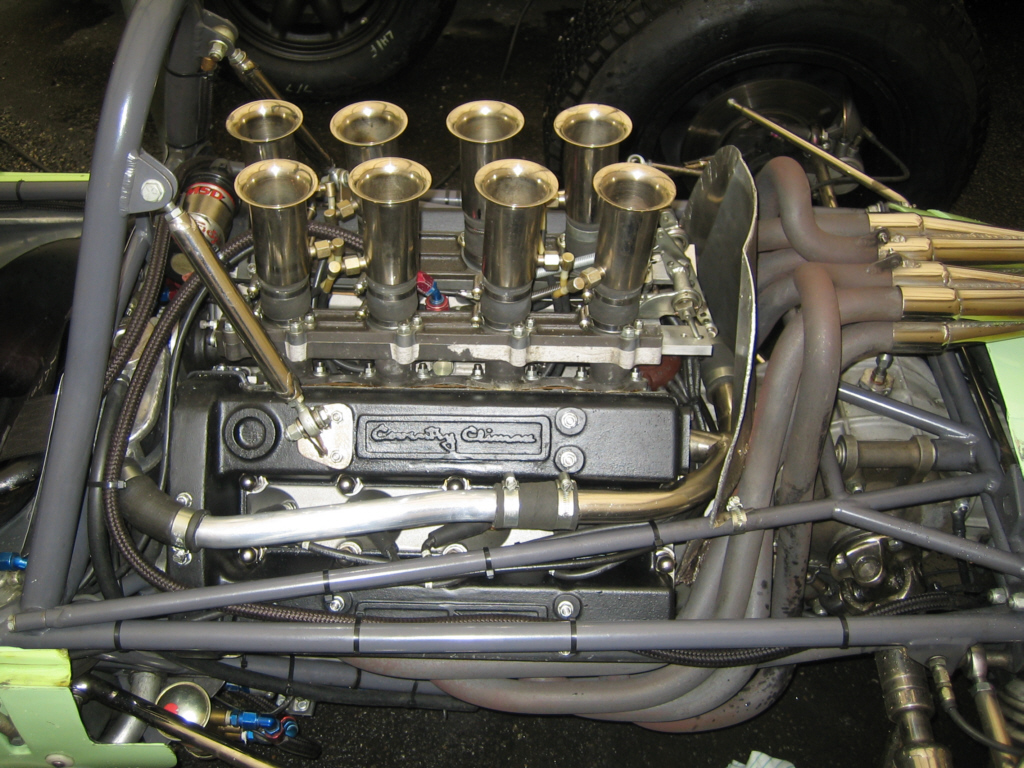
FWMV Mk.III on Lotus 24

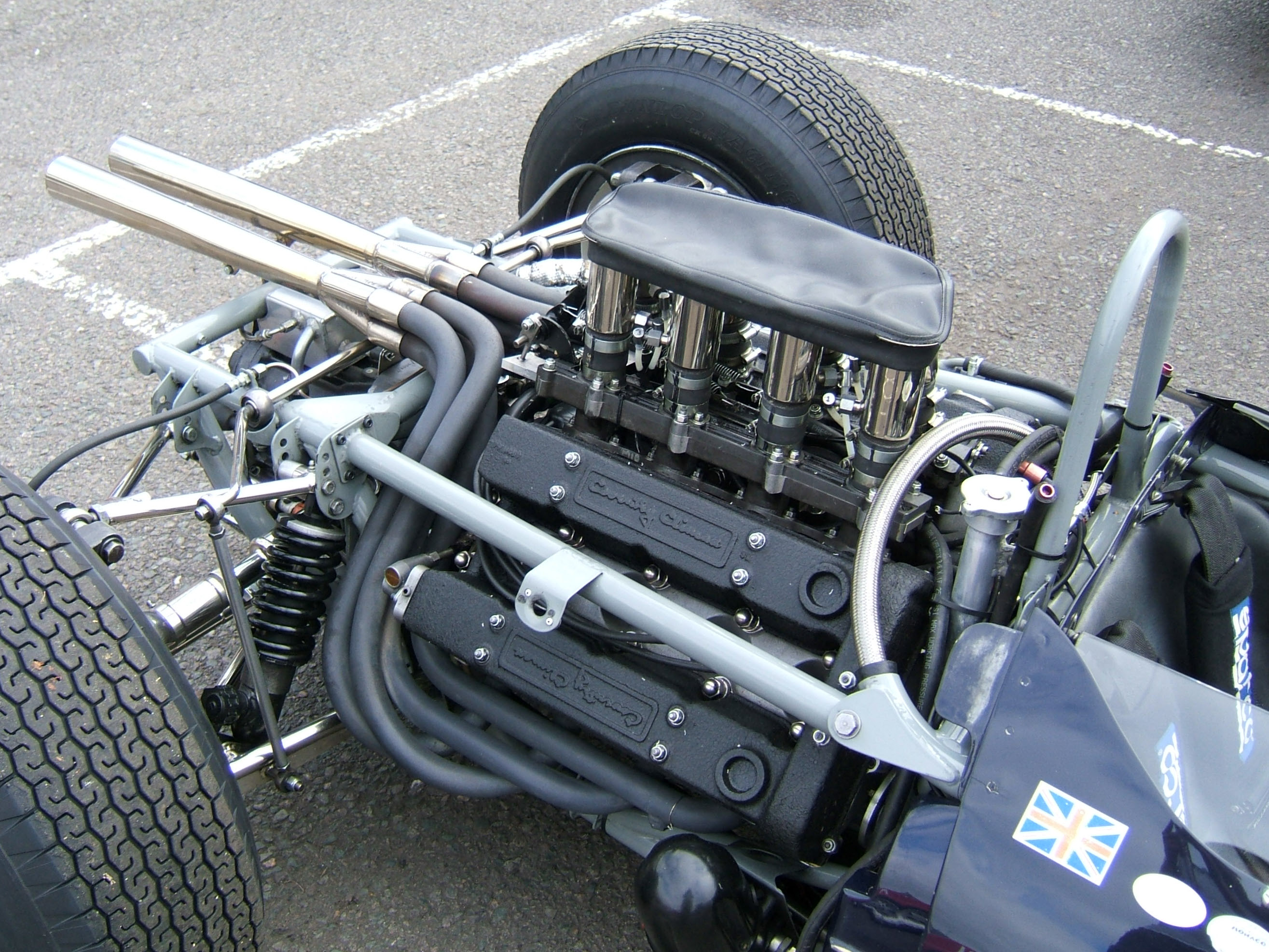
FWMV Mk.4 on Cooper T66

The 1.5-litre FWMV V8, developed from combining two FWMC at 90° using a crossplane crankshaft, was designed in 1960 and ran for the first time in May 1961. It produced 174 bhp (130 kW) from 11.5:1 compression ratio and made its debut in the Cooper T58 of defending champion Jack Brabham at the 1961 German GP in August. Initial developments resulted in 181 bhp (135 kW) at 8500rpm soon after, but Brabham at Cooper and Stirling Moss at Rob Walker Racing Team suffered over-heating problems while enjoying a great amount of V8 power for the rest of the season.

The problem was diagnosed to originate in the steel cylinder sleeve's thermal expansion rate being different from the Aluminium alloy cylinder-head, causing the Cooper Ring in between the sleeve and the head to leak: "[T]he water temperature remained relatively constant, the height of the aluminum cylinder block also remained relatively constant, whereas the cast iron cylinder liner was subject to temperature changes due to firing conditions, that is, throttle open and throttle closed. Once the cause was known, it was quickly and easily rectified by replacing the lower flange on the cylinder liner with an aluminum sleeve, sealing into the base of the cylinder block, and supporting the liner under the upper flange."

With this problem solved in the Mk.II 186 bhp version, having a larger 1.35" intake valves (1.30" previously), FWMV started to score GP victories in the 1962 season in which both Championships were won by BRM and its high-revving V8, scoring 4 wins and two second places. Three Climax-V8-powered British "Garagistes" teams ranked second to fourth, with 3 wins for Lotus, 1 win for Cooper, 5 second places (two for Lola) and 4 third places, in addition to 7 pole positions and 6 fastest laps. The established sportscar factories Porsche (one win) and defending champion Ferrari (winless, three podiums) only ranking 5th and 6th.

For 1963, Coventry Climax was able to convince Lucas to supply the cogged belt-driven fuel injection system originally developed for BRM with then-unique sliding throttle plates with four round intake bores cut-out. With the larger bore (from 63 mm to 68 mm) and shorter stroke (60 mm to 51.5 mm) compared to Mk.II, notable changes include the increase in conrod length (from 4.2" to 5.1" centre to centre, with a shorter piston crown height) and the switch from crossplane to flat-plane crankshaft, which surprisingly did not increase vibration in the higher RPM range because the longer conrod length (and, to a less extent, lighter pistons) counteracted the increase in secondary vibration inherent in flatplane design.

The flat-plane crank was adopted partly due to Rob Walker's proposed successor to the 4WD Ferguson P99 Formula 1 having a front engine layout, which could not accommodate exhaust pipes that merge with pipes from exhaust ports on the opposing bank on crossplane arrangement, but this project did not materialise. Later, such an elaborate crossplane exhaust system became well-known as "bundle of snakes" on the Ford GT40, but was a feature of FWMV Mk.I and Mk.II.

This Mk.III developed 195 bhp (145 kW) at 9,500 rpm, propelling Jim Clark, Lotus 25 and Team Lotus to 7 wins, 7 pole positions, 6 fastest laps, and the 1963 World Championship title.

Mk.4 was developed for 1964 with yet larger bore (72.4 mm) and shorter stroke (45.5 mm) with a larger exhaust valve (from 1.237" to 1.37") and 12:1 compression ratio to result in 200 bhp (149 kW) at 9750rpm. One-off Mk.5 was made with a larger inlet valve (from 1.35" to 1.40") for 203 bhp (151 kW), which was delivered to Lotus and used by Clark in the 1964 season. Mk.4 and Mk.5 scored five wins (three by Clark for Lotus, two by Gurney for Brabham), seven pole positions, and seven fastest laps.

A one-off 4 valves per cylinder Mk.6 had 1.04" intake and 0.935" exhaust valves, new pistons, cylinder sleeves and crankshaft, and had gear driven camshafts as opposed to the previous chain drive. This engine made 212 bhp (158 kW) at 10,300 rpm and went to Lotus during 1965. Another 4-valve one-off, Mk.7, was built with 1.107" intake and 1.043" exhaust and all the new Mk.6 parts for 213 bhp (159 kW) at 10,500 rpm, and was delivered to Brabham. However, these engines started showing reliability problems.

Except for these two one-off 4 valve engines with characteristic ribbed cam covers, all the FWMVs used in 1965 season were 2 valve Mk.5 or earlier versions with various levels of upgrade. This was because Coventry Climax had started the FWMW flat-16 project, which was finally announced at the beginning of 1965, and had more than a handful of things that needed to be developed or solved, so the 4-valve configuration on FWMV did not get completely developed nor did reach a series production. However, Jim Clark was able to win 6 championship races (3 with Mk.6), 6 pole positions and 6 fastest laps to become the 1965 World Champion.

At the end of the 1965 season, the failure of the FWMW project left Coventry Climax with no 3-litre successor to FWMV for the 1966 "return to power" season, so a 2 Litre version of FWMV was assembled using Mk.4 bore (72.40 mm) and Mk.II stroke (60.00 mm) and was used by Lotus in 1966 as a stopgap until 3 litre BRM H-16 engines became available but with little success for BRM except for one GP win by Jim Clark and Lotus. Clark also won the 1967 Tasman Series with the H-16 engine in his Lotus 33.

Overall, FWMV powered Cooper, Lotus and Brabham Formula One cars won 22 World Championship Grand Prix races. The V8 engine also was used by other single-seater constructors, and even in sportscars.

=== FWMW ===
By the middle of the 1962 season, Peter Windsor Smith and Walter Hassan were convinced that the only viable route to more power was through higher revs, and the decision was made, partly in light of Harry Mundy's experiences on the 1.5-Litre supercharged BRM V16, to develop a 1.5-Litre flat-16 designated the FWMW. Design work started in 1963, and a prototype was running on the bench in late 1964 with two flatplane flat-8 cranks end-to-end, shrunk-fit to a central spur gear at 90 degrees phase shift to each other. (Note: not a true boxer arrangement, but rather with opposing pistons sharing a crankpin)

Work on this project continued through the later years of the 1.5 Litre formula with Lotus and Brabham the likely recipients. The engine was fairly compact at 30.9" long (only 1" longer than FWMV Mk.4) and 22.6" wide, but there were a number of design problems still to solve before the formula ran out. Not only had the engine shown no power advantage over the V8 despite its much higher rev limit, but it had mechanical problems that would have required either a major rework to solve properly or, at the least, the need for complete engine rebuilds after 3 hours of running.

From the outset, the largest problem was torsional vibration of the crankshaft, which at one time necessitated a ban on using less than 4000 rpm on the bench. The vibration often caused one or other of the cranks to shear itself off the central spur gear, resulting in the engine becoming two aphasic flat-8s, or the parallel quill shaft (driven at 0.8 times the crank speed, located below crank, and in turn driving the flywheel and ancillaries) overheated and disintegrated.

The central power-take-off system using the parallel shaft was intended to reduce torsional vibration of the long crankshaft, but destructive vibration appeared no matter what was changed in firing order, crank counter-weight configuration or crankshaft weight distribution.

As a result, Coventry Climax could not derive revenues from the project, and was further forced to develop a 2-Litre version of FWMV so that Lotus, who built one Lotus 33 chassis specifically for FWMW, and were counting on using FWMW's anticipated 3-litre successor, could avoid missing the first races of the 1966 season. Neither the old four-cylinder FPF nor the eight-cylinder FWMV could be enlarged to 3 litres, and the 11 years old 2.5-Litre FPE parts had been sold off in their entirety and were in the hands of Paul Emery, who was in the process of enlarging FPE to 3-Litres.

Partly because of this project's grand scale failure, and partly because of Jaguar's take over (Note: See the Jaguar V12 for the reason why Jaguar wanted Coventry Climax resources.) in 1963, Coventry Climax could not develop a 3-litre successor to the FWMW, and announced its withdrawal from the F1 engine business. Its reputation and the long-standing relationship with Team Lotus were seriously tarnished.

=== Jaguar V12 ===
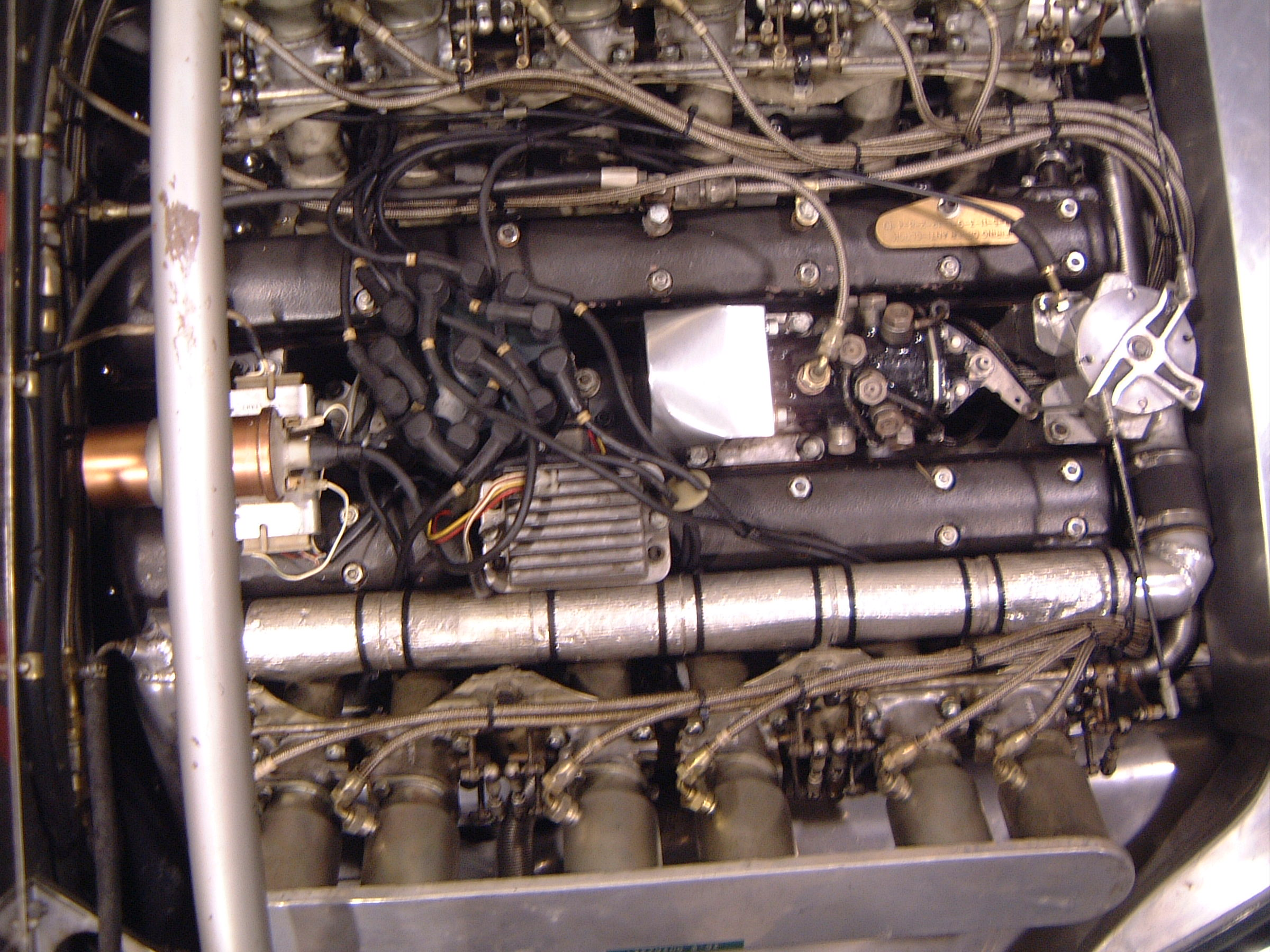
Jaguar XJ13 5 Litre V12

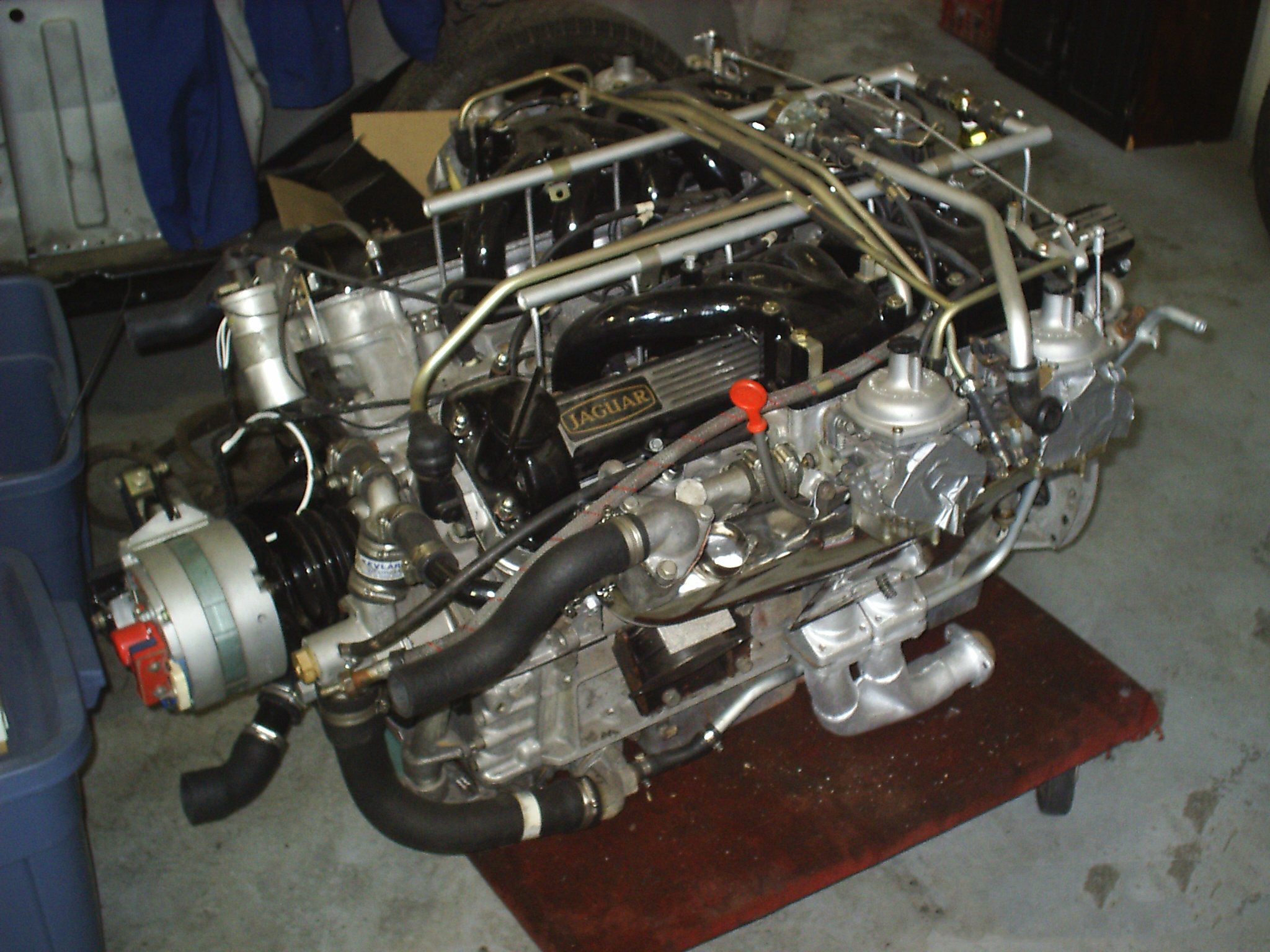
Jaguar 5.3 Litre V12

Having designed and developed the successful Jaguar XK engine under the guidance of William Heynes at SS Cars Ltd, Walter Hassan and the team were tasked to develop a Jaguar 5.0 L DOHC V12 engine when Coventry Climax was purchased by Jaguar in 1963. It was about this time when Walter Hassan convinced Harry Mundy, who had left to become the Technical Editor of The Autocar magazine in 1955 (while there he also designed the Lotus-Ford Twin Cam for Colin Chapman), to rejoin the team, which now included the Jaguar engineer, Claude Baily, who always worked under William Heynes from the days of XK engine development. William Heynes was the executive in charge of the team, who retired in July 1969.

This engine was initially conceived in 1954 for the Le Mans 24 Hour Race by combining two Jaguar XK cylinder heads on a common 60 degree block. The first prototype was assembled in 1964 with LM8 aluminium alloy sand cast block and flanged cast iron liners, EN4A forged and nitrided 7 main bearing crankshaft for 4994 cc (87 mm × 70 mm). This racing engine, with its intake ports in between the intake and the exhaust camshafts, came out to be the fuel-injected 5L DOHC Jaguar XJ13 engine in 1966, but more importantly, it was further developed by the same team into the series-production 5.3 L SOHC V12 engine. This engine, with characteristically long intake tracts connecting the four carburetors on the outside of cam covers to the intake ports inside the V angle, came out to the market on Jaguar E-Type in 1971, on Jaguar XJ12 in 1972, and, together with the later 6.0 L version, remained in production until 1997.

=== CFA and CFF ===
After the designing was finished on the 5.3 L V12 and the Jaguar XJ, Jaguar wanted a modern engine for a smaller version of XJ. Although Jaguar had gained access to the 2.5 Litre iron block Daimler V8 with the take over of Daimler in 1960, it was a pushrod engine designed in the 1950s, and was not particularly small or light as it was based on, and had many common components with, the 4.5 Litre version.

In response, Coventry Climax designed an aluminium crossflow chain-driven SOHC cylinder head somewhat similar to the 5.3L V12 head, on FWMV Mk.4 block with a stroked crank and wet sump. Tecalemit-Jackson fuel injection was used for the development of this 2,496 cc CFA V8 that weighed 300 lb, with a bore and stroke of 80.77 mm and 60.96 mm and the engine was installed on Leonard Pelham Lee's personal Triumph 2000 Estate.

The testing was promising, producing more than 200 bhp at 7,000 rpm in flexible sports-car tune and a 1,812 cc CFF version was prototyped; however, this 1.8 – 2.5 Litre baby XJ project was killed along with the V8 engines when British Motor Holdings merged with Leyland Motor Corporation in 1968 for the strategy to eliminate internal competition against what came out to be the Rover SD1.

=== F1 engines ===
1960 2.5 litre 4 cyl in a Cooper T53

The F1 engines were as follows (bore and stroke figures are unified in inches on Metric designs for comparison):

- 1954 FPE 2492cc V-8 2.95 x 2.78125" 264 bhp (197 kW)@7900rpm Godiva
- 1956 FPF 1475cc 4 cyl 3.20 x 2.80" 141 bhp (105 kW)@7300rpm for F2, ran in GP races
- 1957 FPF 1964cc 4 cyl 3.40 x 3.30" 175 bhp (130 kW)@6500rpm
- 1958 FPF 2207cc 4 cyl 3.50 x 3.50" power figures unknown
- 1958 FPF 2467cc 4 cyl 3.70 x 3.50" 220 bhp (160 kW)@6500rpm
- 1960 FPF 2497cc 4 cyl 3.70 x 3.54" 239 bhp (178 kW)@6750rpm
- 1961 FPF 2751cc 4 cyl 3.78 x 3.74" Indianapolis and Formula Libre
- 1961 FPF Mk.II 1499.8cc 4 cyl 3.23 x 2.80" 151 bhp (113 kW)@7500rpm
- 1961 FWMV Mk.I 1496cc V-8 2.48 x 2.36" 181 bhp (135 kW)@8500rpm Crossplane crank
- 1962 FWMV Mk.II 1496cc V-8 2.48 x 2.36" 186 bhp (139 kW)@8500rpm 1.35" Intake, Crossplane
- 1963 FWMV Mk.III 1496cc V-8 2.675 x 2.03" 195 bhp (145 kW)@9500rpm Fuel injection, Flatplane
- 1964 FWMV Mk.4 1499cc V-8 2.85 x 1.79" 200 bhp (150 kW)@9750rpm 1.37" Exhaust, Flatplane
- 1964 FWMV Mk.5 1499cc V-8 2.85 x 1.79" 203 bhp (151 kW)@9750rpm 1.4" Intake, Lotus
- 1965 FWMV Mk.6 1499cc V-8 2.85 x 1.79" 212 bhp (158 kW)@10300rpm 4 valve/cyl, Lotus
- 1965 FWMV Mk.7 1499cc V-8 2.85 x 1.79" 213 bhp (159 kW)@10500rpm 4 valve/cyl, 1.107" Intake, Brabham
- 1966 FWMV Mk.8 1976cc V-8 2.85 x 2.36" 244 bhp (182 kW)@8900rpm 2 valve/cyl, Lotus, Bonnier
- 1964 FWMW 1495cc F-16 2.13 x 1.60" 209 bhp (156 kW)@12000rpm 2 valve/cyl

== Formula One legacy ==
In the period 1958–1965, Climax-powered cars won 40 (out of 75) World Championship Grands Prix, were runners-up on another 8 occasions, and won 59 non-championship races. The last win for a Climax-powered car in an international event was Mike Spence's win in the non-championship 1966 South African Grand Prix, driving a Lotus 33. The last entries for Climax-powered cars in a World Championship Grand Prix were at the 1969 Canadian Grand Prix, where John Cordts' Brabham retired with an oil leak and Al Pease in an Eagle was disqualified for driving too slowly.

World Championship Formula One wins
Year	Race	Entrant	Driver	Chassis	Engine
1958	Argentine Grand Prix	R.R.C. Walker Racing Team	(United Kingdom) Stirling Moss	Cooper T43	FPF
1958	Monaco Grand Prix	R.R.C. Walker Racing Team	(France) Maurice Trintignant	Cooper T45	FPF
1959	Monaco Grand Prix	Cooper Car Company	(Australia) Jack Brabham	Cooper T51	FPF
1959	British Grand Prix	Cooper Car Company	(Australia) Jack Brabham	Cooper T51	FPF
1959	Portuguese Grand Prix	R.R.C. Walker Racing Team	(United Kingdom) Stirling Moss	Cooper T51	FPF
1959	Italian Grand Prix	R.R.C. Walker Racing Team	(United Kingdom) Stirling Moss	Cooper T51	FPF
1959	United States Grand Prix	Cooper Car Company	(New Zealand) Bruce McLaren	Cooper T51	FPF
1960	Argentine Grand Prix	Cooper Car Company	(New Zealand) Bruce McLaren	Cooper T51	FPF
1960	Monaco Grand Prix	R.R.C. Walker Racing Team	(United Kingdom) Stirling Moss	Lotus 18	FPF
1960	Dutch Grand Prix	Cooper Car Company	(Australia) Jack Brabham	Cooper T53	FPF
1960	Belgian Grand Prix	Cooper Car Company	(Australia) Jack Brabham	Cooper T53	FPF
1960	French Grand Prix	Cooper Car Company	(Australia) Jack Brabham	Cooper T53	FPF
1960	British Grand Prix	Cooper Car Company	(Australia) Jack Brabham	Cooper T53	FPF
1960	Portuguese Grand Prix	Cooper Car Company	(Australia) Jack Brabham	Cooper T53	FPF
1960	United States Grand Prix	R.R.C. Walker Racing Team	(United Kingdom) Stirling Moss	Lotus 18	FPF
1961	Monaco Grand Prix	R.R.C. Walker Racing Team	(United Kingdom) Stirling Moss	Lotus 18	FPF Mk II
1961	German Grand Prix	R.R.C. Walker Racing Team	(United Kingdom) Stirling Moss	Lotus 18/21	FPF Mk II
1961	United States Grand Prix	Team Lotus	(United Kingdom) Innes Ireland	Lotus 21	FPF Mk II
1962	Monaco Grand Prix	Cooper Car Company	(New Zealand) Bruce McLaren	Cooper T60	FWMV
1962	Belgian Grand Prix	Team Lotus	(United Kingdom) Jim Clark	Lotus 25	FWMV
1962	British Grand Prix	Team Lotus	(United Kingdom) Jim Clark	Lotus 25	FWMV
1962	United States Grand Prix	Team Lotus	(United Kingdom) Jim Clark	Lotus 25	FWMV
1963	Belgian Grand Prix	Team Lotus	(United Kingdom) Jim Clark	Lotus 25	FWMV
1963	Dutch Grand Prix	Team Lotus	(United Kingdom) Jim Clark	Lotus 25	FWMV
1963	French Grand Prix	Team Lotus	(United Kingdom) Jim Clark	Lotus 25	FWMV
1963	British Grand Prix	Team Lotus	(United Kingdom) Jim Clark	Lotus 25	FWMV
1963	Italian Grand Prix	Team Lotus	(United Kingdom) Jim Clark	Lotus 25	FWMV
1963	Mexican Grand Prix	Team Lotus	(United Kingdom) Jim Clark	Lotus 25	FWMV
1963	South African Grand Prix	Team Lotus	(United Kingdom) Jim Clark	Lotus 25	FWMV
1964	Dutch Grand Prix	Team Lotus	(United Kingdom) Jim Clark	Lotus 25	FWMV
1964	Belgian Grand Prix	Team Lotus	(United Kingdom) Jim Clark	Lotus 25	FWMV
1964	French Grand Prix	Brabham Racing Organisation	(United States) Dan Gurney	Brabham BT7	FWMV
1964	British Grand Prix	Team Lotus	(United Kingdom) Jim Clark	Lotus 25	FWMV
1964	Mexican Grand Prix	Brabham Racing Organisation	(United States) Dan Gurney	Brabham BT7	FWMV
1965	South African Grand Prix	Team Lotus	(United Kingdom) Jim Clark	Lotus 33	FWMV
1965	Belgian Grand Prix	Team Lotus	(United Kingdom) Jim Clark	Lotus 33	FWMV
1965	French Grand Prix	Team Lotus	(United Kingdom) Jim Clark	Lotus 25	FWMV
1965	British Grand Prix	Team Lotus	(United Kingdom) Jim Clark	Lotus 33	FWMV
1965	Dutch Grand Prix	Team Lotus	(United Kingdom) Jim Clark	Lotus 33	FWMV
1965	German Grand Prix	Team Lotus	(United Kingdom) Jim Clark	Lotus 33	FWMV

== Climax-powered vehicles ==
Some notable Coventry Climax-powered cars:

- 1911 GWK, 2 cyl. Coventry Simplex
- 1913 Bamford & Martin, 4 cyl. Coventry Simplex, The first Aston Martin
- 1922 Lea Francis C-Type, 1074cc OC
- 1922 Clyno 1368cc F-type (also 1496cc, 1593cc)
- 1925 Waverley Cars, 1990cc CX
- 1929 AJS Nine, 1018cc OC
- 1930 Crossley 10, 1122cc OC
- 1933 Vale Special, 1098cc OC, 1476cc JM
- 1935 Triumph Gloria, 1087/1232cc OC, 1476/1991cc JM
- 1935 Crossley Regis, 1122cc OC, 1476 cc and 1640cc JM
- 1936 Morgan 4-4, 1122cc OC
- 1954 Kieft-Climax 1100 LeMans, 1098cc FWA
- 1954 Kieft-Climax V8, 2492cc FPE, not raced
- 1955 Cooper T39 Climax 'Bobtail', 1098cc FWA
- 1955 Lotus Mark IX 1098 FWA Le Mans
- 1955–64 Cooper Monaco Mk.I(T49), Mk.II(T57/59), Mk.III(T61/62/64), 1475/1964/2203/2467/2751cc FPF
- 1956–7 Lotus Eleven, 1098cc FWA, 1460cc FWB, 744cc FWC
- 1957 Cooper T43 Climax, 1964cc FPF, The first mid-engine car to win a Grand Prix
- 1957–58 Lotus 12 Climax, 1475/1964/2203cc FPF
- 1957–63 Lotus Elite, 1216cc FWE, 742cc FWMC (UDT Laystall, 1961 Le Mans)
- 1958 TVR Grantura, 1216cc FWE
- 1958–60 Lotus 16 Climax, 1475/1964/2467/2495cc FPF
- 1959 Lotus 17, 1098cc FWA, 1460cc FWB, 742cc FWMA
- 1959 Cooper T51, 2467cc FPF, World Champion
- 1959–65 Turner Sports, 1098cc FWA, 1216cc FWE
- 1960–61 Lotus 18, 2495cc FPF, 1475cc FPF
- 1960 Cooper T53, 2495cc FPF, World Champion
- 1960–63 Lotus 19, 2467/2495/2751cc FPF
- 1961 Cooper T54, 2751cc FPF, The first mid-engine Indy car
- 1962–64 Lotus 23, 742cc FWMC, 748cc FWMB
- 1962–65 Lotus 25, 1496/1497cc FWMV, World Champion
- 1963–76 Hillman Imp, 875 – 998cc Rootes engine, but design inspired by FWMA
- 1964–65 Brabham BT11, 1497cc FWMV
- 1965 Lotus 33, 1497cc FWMV, World Champion
- 1965–75 Bond 875 and Bond Ranger, low compression version of Imp engine
- 1967–74 Ginetta G15, 875cc Imp and 998cc Rally Imp engines
- 1970–75 Elfin Type 350/360, 2.0–2.5L FPF
- 1971–74 Clan Crusader, 875cc Imp engine

== See also ==
- Cosworth
- List of automotive superlatives
- Forklift truck

== Bibliography ==
- Hammill, Des Coventry Climax Racing Engines: The Definitive Development History ISBN 1-903706-83-1
- Brain, Eric (5 March 2010). "Coventry Climax Engines Ltd". Archived from the original on 23 August 2012.
- Hassan, Walter, Climax in Coventry ISBN 0953072126
