= GWK (car) =

British car made between 1911 and 1931

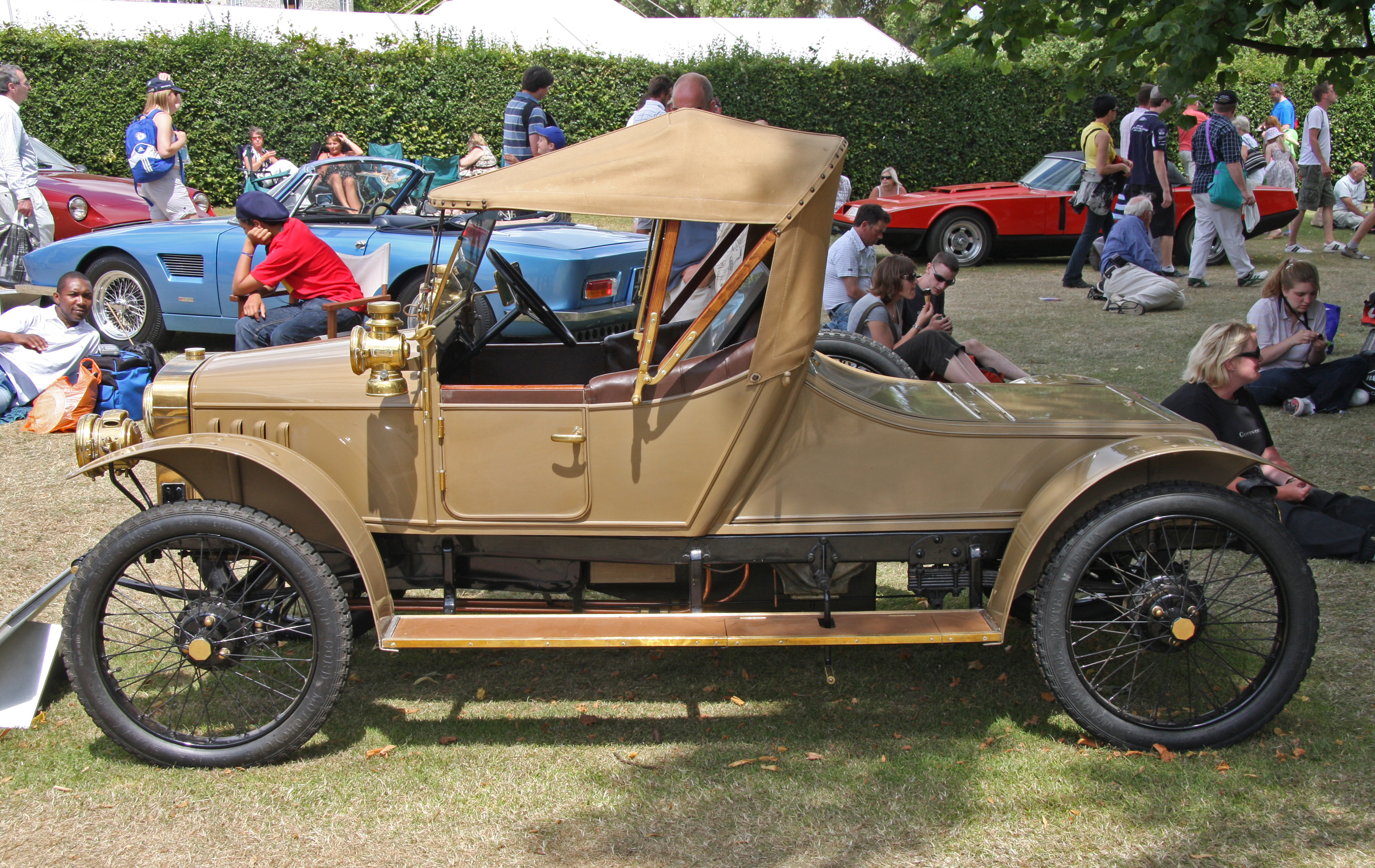
1914 GWK Type B

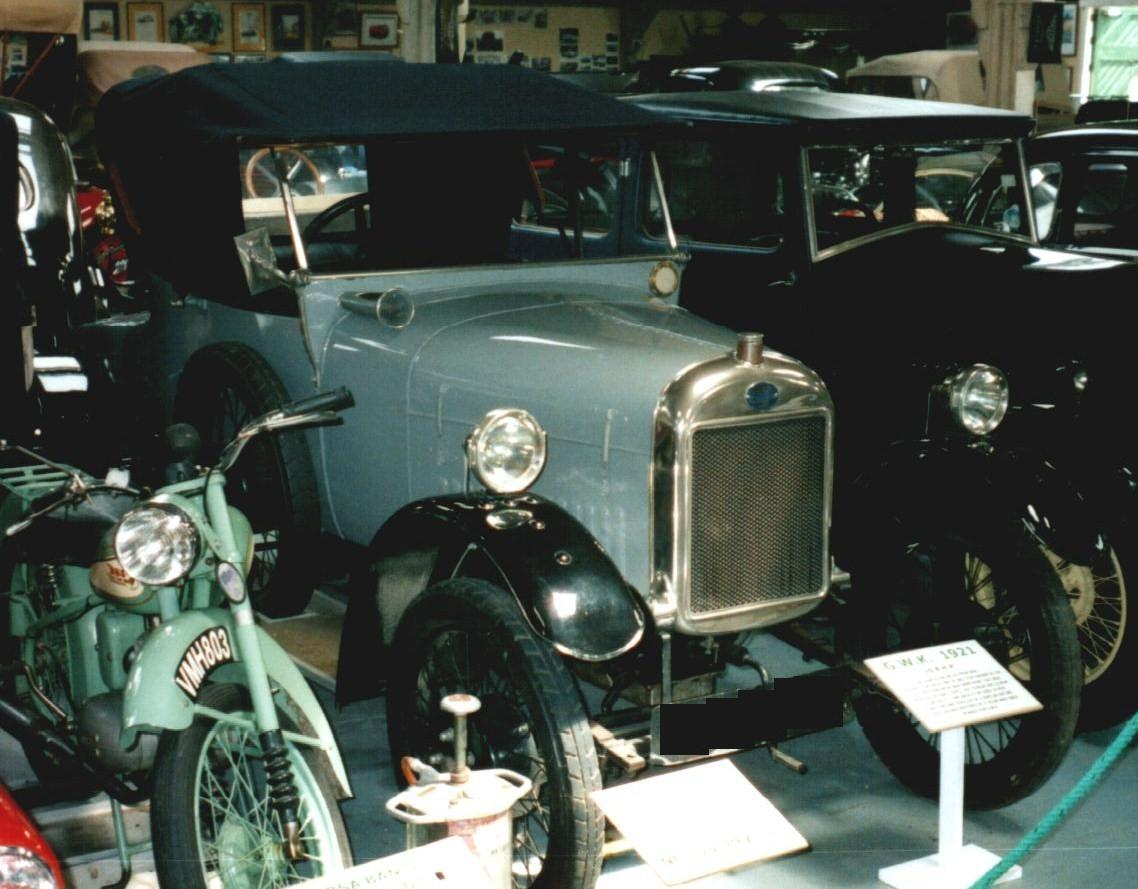
GWK 1921

The GWK was a British car made in Maidenhead, Berkshire, between 1911 and 1931. It got its name from its founders, Arthur Grice, J. Talfourd Wood, and C.M. Keiller. The cars were unusual in using a friction drive system.

== Pre-war ==
The prototype was made in a stable in Beckenham, Kent, and used a Coventry-Simplex engine, rear-mounted. The drive system involved the engine, which was mounted across the chassis, turning a disc on which a wheel could be moved from the periphery to the centre. Top speed was with the driven wheel furthest from the centre and reverse was obtained by moving it past the centre. A few examples were sold before the company moved to Datchet, Buckinghamshire in 1912.

Proper production now started still using a water-cooled, Coventry-Simplex twin-cylinder engine of 1069 cc. 1,045 of the two-seat cars were made before the outbreak of World War 1 and a move to war work; this first stage of car production ended in mid-1915. A move was also made to the larger Cordwallis Works in Maidenhead in 1914. During the war the company was run by Grice as his partners were in the army.

At the 1913 A.C.U. Six-Day trial, a GWK was one of three cars to finish (out of twelve starters), and it won the Gold medal in the four-wheel class.

== Post-war ==
Grice left the company in 1920 to start the unsuccessful Unit car company leaving Wood and Keiller in charge. They re-introduced the pre-war model, now called the Type E, and a further 82 were made largely from left over parts. A new model, the Type F was introduced in 1919 and was front-engined with a 1368 cc four-cylinder engine, still by Coventry-Simplex, with shaft drive to the friction disc at the rear. It was not a good seller partly because of the noise from the transmission; the power of the larger engine was more than the friction drive design could accommodate. The Type H overcame most of the drive line problems but suffered from the reputation of its predecessor. About 1,700 of the Types F and H were made between 1919 and 1926.

The company had not given up on the rear-engined idea and a new car, the Type J, appeared in 1922 but only a few were sold. It had a bonnet and radiator very similar to the front-engined cars. The final car, the type G of 1930 was also rear-engined, with the engine behind the rear axle, only a few were made.

GWK's greatest days were before World War 1 and after 1918 financial success eluded them. They went into temporary liquidation in 1922 and Wood and Keiller left but Grice returned in 1923. No cars seem to have been made between 1926 and 1930 and very few of the Type G were produced. The company finally closed in 1931 with the Cordwallis factory being used by Streamline Cars Ltd and later Marendaz.

GWK also sold an imported Belgian Impéria car between 1924 and 1928 as the British Imperia. There were plans to build the Imperia at Maidenhead but these came to nothing.

== See also ==
- List of car manufacturers of the United Kingdom
