= Ashton-Evans =

The Ashton-Evans was an English car manufactured in Birmingham from 1919 to 1928 by Joseph Evans & Co of Liverpool Street Mills an engineering company who also made railway locomotives and aircraft parts. In 1919 a new company Ashton-Evans Motors Ltd was formed. The cars were designed by E Bailey who had been with Sunbeam and later J. Bedford.

The first car of the marque designed by E Bailey was described as "a three-wheeler with four wheels" and had a rear track of only 8 inches (200 mm) to avoid the need for a differential. The rear axle was suspended by a quarter elliptic spring fastened to the tubular chassis at the front and resting on a metal plate on the top of the rear axle which was located by the use of a torque tube and two rods. It is not certain if any of these cars were sold.

In 1920 Mr Ashton-Evans decided to find out what his customers wanted in an "owner driver's ideal" car and invited opinions. From the response he worked out that the car should have a four-cylinder water cooled engine not exceeding 12 taxable hp and be silent, vibrationless, easy to start and powerful. Gear changing should be silent and without the need to double declutch. There should be room for three people on the front seat. To meet this specification J Bedford designed a new car which became the Ashton 10.5 model, the Ashton-Evans name being temporarily dropped. This had a normal rear axle. Most cars featured 1 1/2-litre, 4-cylinder Coventry Simplex engines and three-speed constant-mesh gearboxes with selection made by dog clutches. Some of the early cars might have had two-cylinder engines. Two- and four-seat open bodies were available.

Production of cars was slow and probably not profitable and in 1923 a single model, the 11/16 was made and the name returned to Ashton-Evans. A fire in 1924 badly hit production and car production was temporarily suspended in 1927 but never resumed.

As many as 250 might have been made.

== See also ==
- List of car manufacturers of the United Kingdom
