= Abbey (automobile) =

Friction drive car assembled by a British car manufacturer

The Abbey was a short-lived friction drive car assembled by the Abbey Auto Engineering Co. Ltd in Westminster, England. It used a 10.8 hp 1498 cc Coventry-Simplex engine. It was built in 1922 only and cost £315. It also had Marles steering gear and friction drive. The two-seater model sold for £315.

Very few seem to have been made.

After 1922 the car may have been sold as the Lewis.

== See also ==
- List of car manufacturers of the United Kingdom
