= Hale Products Incorporated =

Hale Products Corporation
- Type: Public
- Industry: Manufacturing
- Founded: 1914
- Headquarters: Ocala, Florida
- Products: water pumps, fire pumps, hydraulic rescue tools
- Website: Official Hale Website

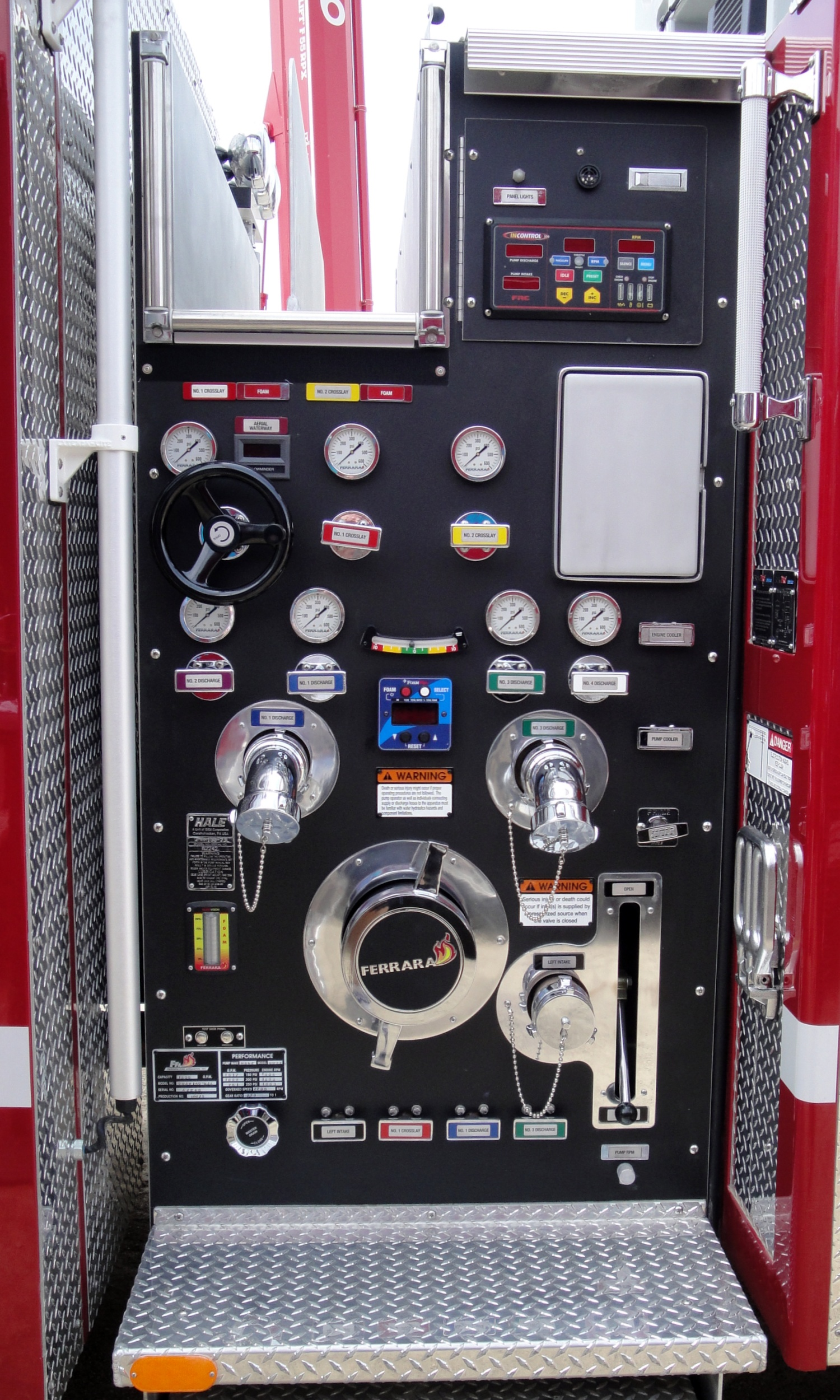
Hale midship pump panel (Ferrara Fire Apparatus)

Hale Products Incorporated is a unit of IDEX Corporation. Like its parent, IDEX, Hale manufactures hydraulic equipment. However, this equipment is designed almost exclusively for the fire and rescue field.
