= Marendaz Special =

D. M. K. Marendaz Limited
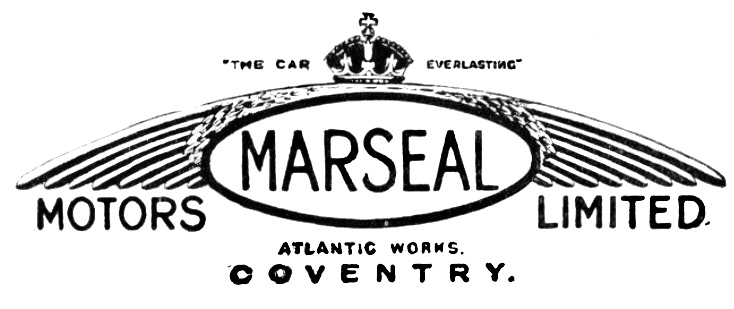
- Company type: Private
- Industry: Automotive
- Founded: 1926; 100 years ago
- Defunct: 1936; 90 years ago
- Headquarters: Maidenhead, England
- Key people: Donald Marcus Kelway Marendaz
- Products: Automobile

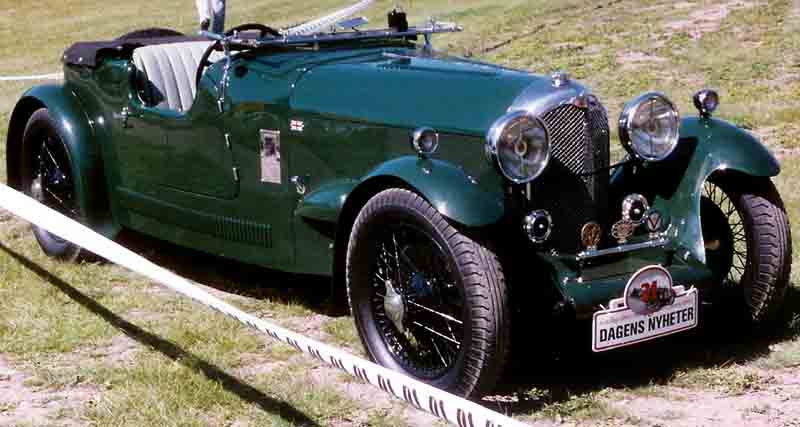
Marendaz Special 13/70 2-Seater Sports 1932

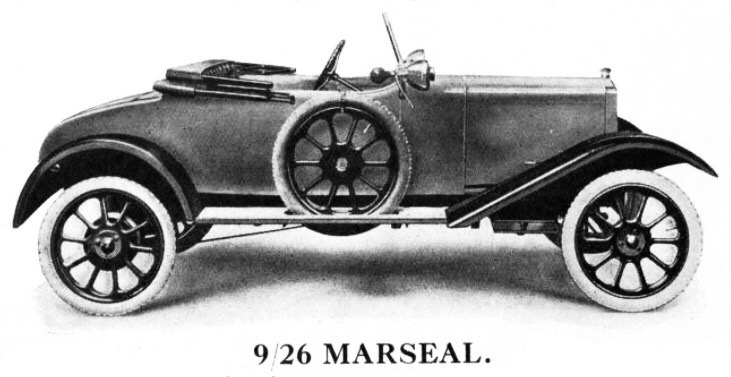
Marseal 9-26

Marendaz cars were made in Brixton Road, London SW9, England from 1926 to 1932 and in Maidenhead, Berkshire, England from 1932 to 1936. They were sold as Marendaz Specials.

DMK (Donald Marcus Kelway) Marendaz served as an apprentice at Siddeley-Deasy before the first World War. He left to join the Royal Flying Corps in 1916, training as a pilot and serving in France until invalided out in 1918 with the rank of lieutenant. Nevertheless, from that point on he liked to style himself "Captain". After 1918, he joined Alvis, but was sacked, and shortly afterwards started Marseel with a Mr Seelhaft; the company manufactured gearboxes for the Emscote car. Emscote did not take all the gearboxes they made, so the surplus were used with Coventry-Simplex engines to make complete cars. The company changed its name to Marseal in 1923, when Seelhart left. Between 1920 and 1925, when Marseal failed, as many as 1200 cars might have been made in the Coventry factory.

After a brief period in the City of London, in 1926 Marendaz started DMK Marendaz Ltd in the premises of the London Cab Company in Brixton, where the London agents for Bugatti and Graham-Paige were also based. The cars were attractive-looking with a Bentley-like radiator and mainly used Anzani engines. Model names were often confusingly complex with the 11/55, 14/55 and 14/125 also being called the 1 1/2-litre. A strange departure was the 1495 cc straight-eight which used a special Anzani crank and Marendaz designed block. Although catalogued in normal and supercharged form, it is thought not to have got past the prototype stage. Although supporting an ambitious racing programme, very few cars were made and it seems that the company's main income derived from tuning and servicing work and the sales of used sporting cars. Somewhere between 20 and 50 cars were made between 1926 and 1932. Marendaz had an aversion to journalists and so exactly what happened in the factory is often a mystery. He was also famous for threatening legal action against anyone who made remarks about his cars he did not agree with.

In 1932 the company was re-organised as Marendaz Special Cars Ltd and moved to Cornwallis Works, Maidenhead where GWK and Burney cars had also been made. The cars at first used American Continental engines with Marendaz cylinder heads and manifolding but later were probably completely built by Marendaz as he redesigned the block. The gearboxes might also have been Marendaz designed, but some by Moss were used. Sales were again supported by a considerable racing programme including entries by Marendaz himself up to 1931 and his secretary Miss Dorothy Summers up to 1936. They were also raced by Mr and Mrs AE Moss, the parents of Sir Stirling Moss.

Production ceased in 1936. Estimates of production range from about 80 to 120 cars in total, including those from Brixton. Survivors from the Brixton days are rare but several of the 13/70 and 15/80 range still exist.

When the car manufacturing business folded in 1936, Marendaz went on to set up International Aircraft and Engineering Ltd to build aircraft but only one, the Marendaz Trainer was completed and flown.

Marendaz was a supporter of Oswald Mosley, leader of the British Union of Fascists, and this led in 1940 to him being jailed on security charges. He was released after a few days. After the war, he emigrated to South Africa where he built small diesel engines. He returned to England in 1972 and died in 1988 at the age of 91.

== Models ==
Type	Engine	body styles	Year	Notes
Marendaz Special 11/55	1496 cc side-valve 4-cylinder Anzani	sports	1926-30	Three or Four speed gearboxes. Four wheel brakes, pedal operated front, lever rear. 75 mph (121 km/h) max. 104-inch wheelbase. £495.
Marendaz Special 11/120	1496 cc side-valve 4-cylinder Anzani engine	sports	1925-29	Supercharged version of the 11/55-litre. £750.
Marendaz Special 9/90	1094 cc side-valve 4-cylinder	sports	1926-31	Probably a sleeved down version of 11/55. Took world class G 24 hour record in 1928.
Marendaz Special 14/55	1495 cc overhead input side exhaust valve 8-cylinder Marendaz engine	sports	1929-31	Eight-cylinder version of 11/55. 114 in (2,896 mm) wheelbase. Few (if any) made.
Marendaz Special 14/125	1495 cc overhead input side exhaust valve 8-cylinder Marendaz engine		1926-31	Supercharged version of 14/55. Probably none made.
Marendaz Special 13/70	1869 cc side-valve 6-cylinder Continental engine	2-seater, 4-seater, coupe.	1932-34	Produced in Maidenhead factory. 116 in (2,946 mm) wheelbase. Hydraulic brakes. £375.
Marendaz Special 13/85	1869 cc side-valve 6-cylinder Continental based engine	2-seater, 4-seater, coupe.	1934	
Marendaz Special 13/90	1985 cc side-valve 6-cylinder engine		1935-36	Zoller supercharged 13/70. Few (if any) made. There was also a similar 13/100.
Marendaz Special 17/97	2454 cc side-valve 6-cylinder engine	tourer, foursome coupe, drophead coupe	1934	Large bored 13/70 engine. Single Zenith carburettor. 116-inch wheelbase. Unlikely that the coupe was ever made.
Marendaz Special 17/80	2454 cc side-valve 6-cylinder engine	tourer, foursome coupe, drophead coupe	1935-36	
Marendaz Special 17/100	2454 cc side-valve 6-cylinder engine	tourer, foursome coupe, drophead coupe	1935-36	Zoller supercharged 17/97.
Marendaz Special 17/115	2454 cc side-valve 6-cylinder engine	tourer, foursome coupe, drophead coupe	1935-36	Supercharged 17/97.
Marendaz Special 15/80	1991 cc overhead inlet side exhaust valve 6-cylinder Coventry Climax engine.	tourer	1936	Same chassis as 17/97 range. Servo brakes.
Marendaz Special 15/90	1991 cc overhead inlet side exhaust valve 6-cylinder Coventry Climax engine.	tourer	1936	82 mph (132 km/h) on test. Supercharged model also available.

== See also ==
- List of car manufacturers of the United Kingdom
