= Crouch Cars =

Crouch Cars Ltd.
- Company type: Private
- Industry: Automotive
- Founded: 1912
- Founder: John William Fisher Crouch (known as Bill)
- Defunct: 1928
- Headquarters: Coventry, England
- Products: Automobile
- Number of employees: 400

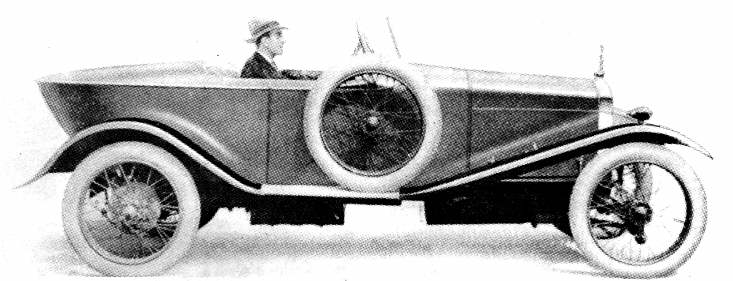
Crouch 12/24 Sports

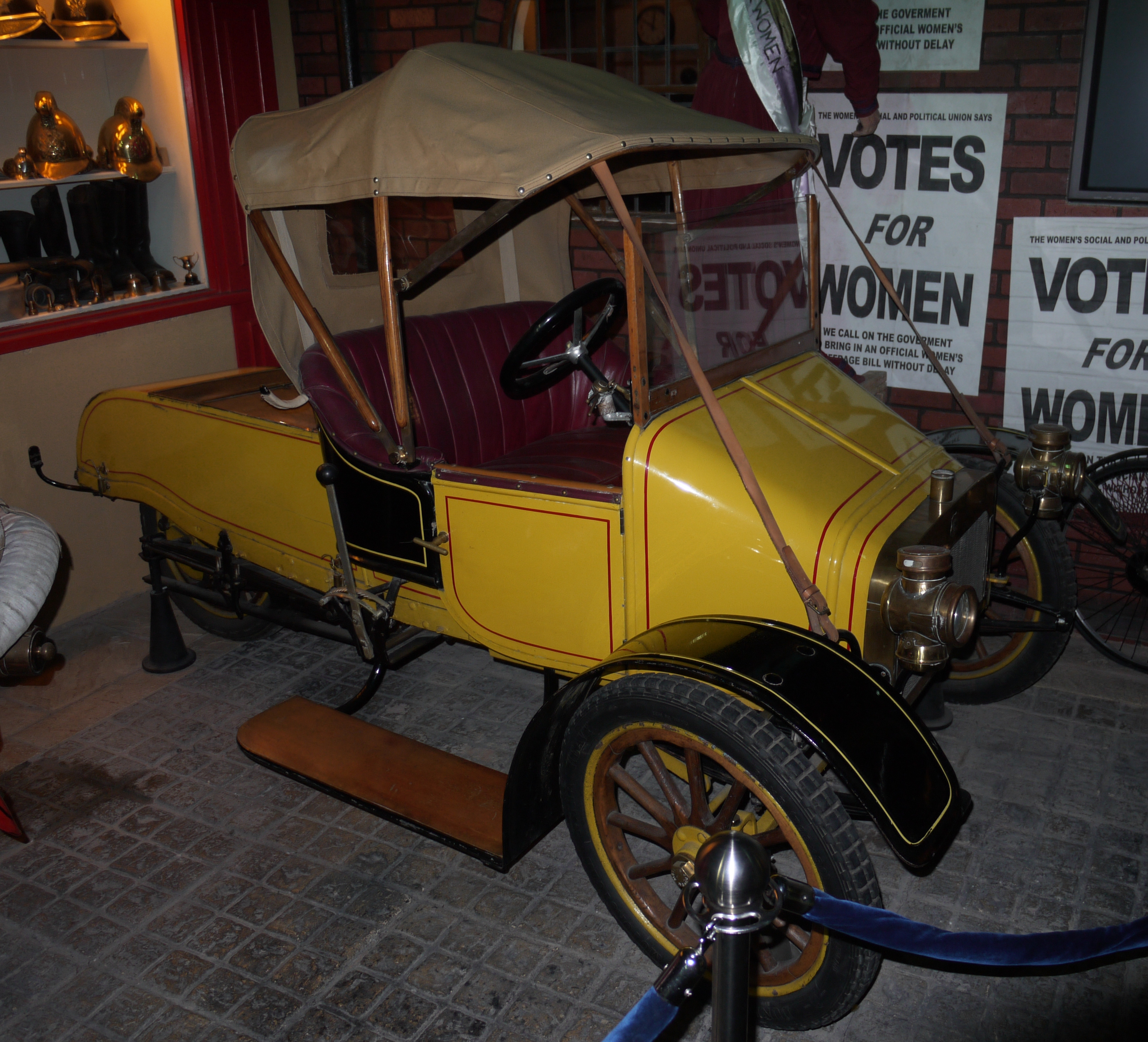
A Crouch 1912

Crouch Cars was a company founded by JWF Crouch in Coventry, England in 1912 which manufactured cars until 1928. It was located at first in Bishop Street moving in 1914 to Cook Street.

== History ==
The first model, the Carette was a three-wheeled cyclecar with a side-valve, water-cooled Crouch V-twin engine of 740 cc mounted behind the seats. It was of unconventional appearance with a low, wide radiator. The chassis frame was of ash with metal armouring and the drive was to the single rear wheel via a three-speed gearbox and chain. It cost around a £100 and was claimed to be capable of 35 mph (56 km/h) and 50 miles per imperial gallon (5.6 L/100 km; 42 mpg_{‑US}). Later in 1912 it was also available as a four-wheeler with the engine enlarged to 906 cc. In 1913 it grew to 994 cc and in 1914 to 1018 cc. One of the cars gained a Gold Medal in the 1912 London-Exeter trial. When production restarted after the war the model became known as the 8 with the engine now displacing 1115 cc. The last one may have been made as late as 1922 when it cost £245.

In 1922 a more conventional car came along, the 8/18, still a two-seater and dickey, with pressed steel chassis and shaft drive. The V-twin engine was retained, however, but now with overhead-valves and 1248 cc capacity. It was listed at £285. About 1500 V-twin cars are thought to have been made after the First World War and possibly 400 before 1914.

With other manufacturers offering four-seat cars at less money it was necessary for Crouch to change and in 1922 the 12/24 was announced at £350 for a four-seater and £335 for a two-seater with four-cylinder Anzani 1496 cc engine and three-speed gearbox. An electric starter was fitted. A 60 mph (97 km/h) Sports and 80 mph (130 km/h) Super Sports were listed and one of these were raced at Brooklands by Alfred Moss, the father of Stirling Moss, who sold the cars from his London premises. About 800 12/24s are thought to have been made.

The cars were still expensive, and so in 1923 the Economic 10/4 10 hp model was announced at £250, using a four-cylinder Dorman side-valve engine of 1200 cc. It was not terribly successful and only about 60 were made.

For 1925 the 12/24 became the 12/30, the Economic vanished and what was to be the final car the 11/27 was announced. This had a 1368 cc Coventry Simplex four-cylinder side-valve engine and was priced between £225 and £285. About 100 11/27s were made.

The company disappeared with many others as a result of the Great Depression, and the rise of mass-produced small cars which could comfortably undersell the largely hand-built small-makers models. A failed export order did not help.

Of the approximately 3000 cars made, only about five are known to have survived.

At its peak Crouch employed about 400 people and turned out 25 cars a week. John Crouch, the founder, had trained with Daimler, and his son Bob worked there after the family firm closed. He eventually became head of bus sales.

Crouch Cars of England had no connection with Crouch of New Brighton, Pennsylvania, USA, who manufactured steam cars between 1897 and 1900.

== See also ==
- List of car manufacturers of the United Kingdom
