= Kurt Ahrens Jr. =

German racing driver (born 1940)

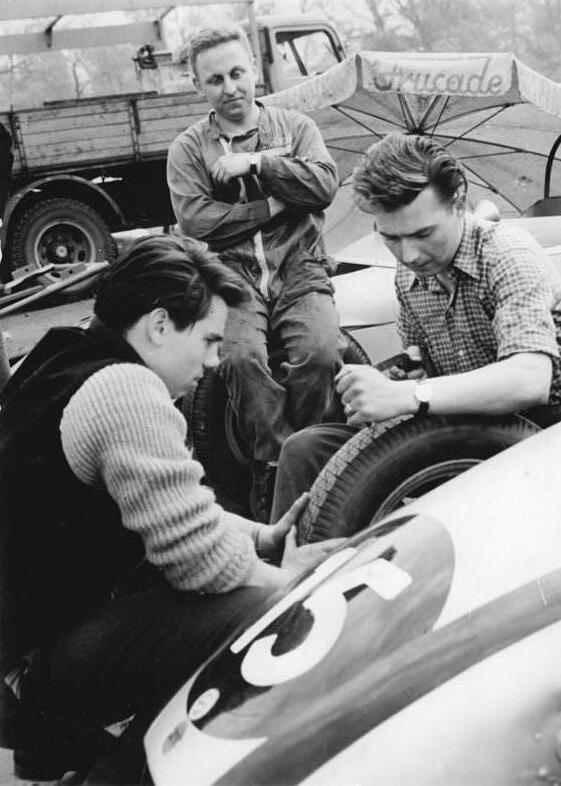
- Kurt Ahrens Jr. (center) in 1961.
- Born: 19 April 1940 (age 86); Braunschweig, Germany

Formula One World Championship career
- Nationality: (Germany) German
- Active years: 1966-1969
- Team: non-works Brabham
- Entries: 4
- Championships: 0
- Wins: 0
- Podiums: 0
- Career points: 0
- Pole positions: 0
- Fastest laps: 0
- First entry: 1966 German Grand Prix
- Last entry: 1969 German Grand Prix

Kurt Karl-Heinrich Ahrens (born 19 April 1940), also known as Kurt Ahrens Jr., is a German former racing driver who occasionally appeared in German Grand Prix races, mostly in Formula 2 cars.

His father, Kurt Ahrens Sr., was a German speedway champion who competed against his son for five years.

== Career ==
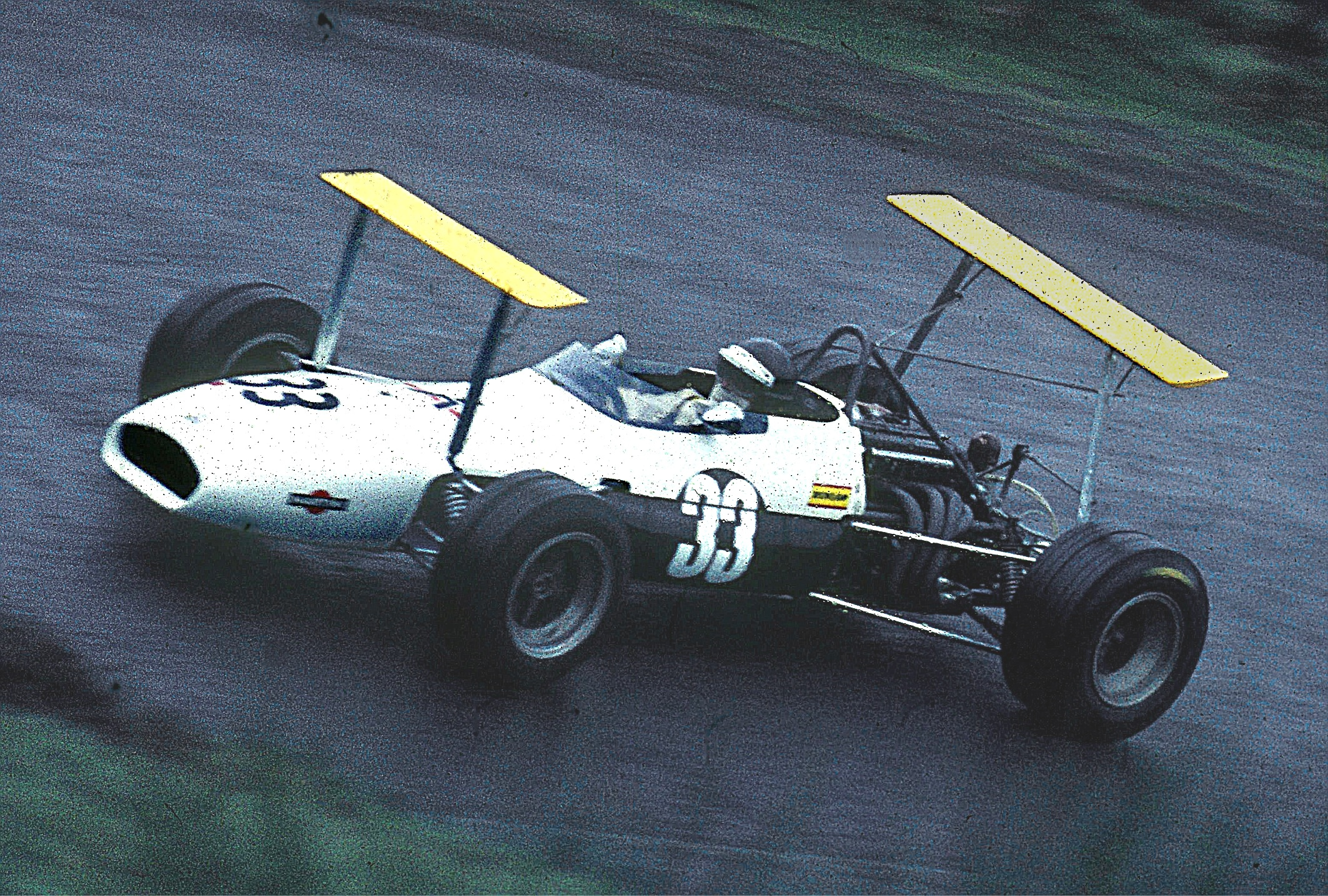
Kurt Ahrens Jr. driving a Brabham F2 in 1969.

Kurt Ahrens Jr. started in 1958 with a Cooper-Norton Formula 3 and won the German Formula Junior title in 1961 and 1963, when his father retired.

Ahrens then raced Formula 2 and was present when Jim Clark was killed at the Hockenheimring in 1968. Due to the long Nürburgring track, it was possible to take part in the German Grand Prix in Formula 2 cars. He participated mostly with Brabhams for the Caltex Racing team, and was invited to drive the Brabham-Repco F1 in the wet 1968 German Grand Prix.

In 1968, Ahrens joined the Porsche factory sports car team and shared victory with Jo Siffert in the 1969 Austrian 1000 km event. He co-drove the pole-setting Porsche 917 "long tail" at the 1969 24 Hours of Le Mans and the 1970 24 Hours of Le Mans, but neither car finished. In 1970, he partnered with Vic Elford to win the 1000km Nürburgring in a Porsche 908.

Ahrens retired after 1970, taking pride in never crashing in a race. He had suffered a high speed shunt in April 1970 while testing a long tail Porsche on a wet Ehra-Lessien, with the car disintegrating badly- the car went under the Armco barrier and broke in half (as they were known to do), leaving Ahrens strapped in the back.

== Racing record ==
=== Complete Formula One World Championship results ===
(key)

Year	Entrant	Chassis	Engine	1	2	3	4	5	6	7	8	9	10	11	12	WDC	Points
1966	Caltex Racing Team	Brabham BT18 (F2)	Ford Cosworth SCA 1.0 L4	MON	BEL	FRA	GBR	NED	GER; Ret	ITA	USA	MEX				NC	0
1967	Ron Harris Racing Team	Protos (F2)	Ford Cosworth FVA 1.6 L4	RSA	MON	NED	BEL	FRA	GBR	GER; Ret	CAN	ITA	USA	MEX		NC	0
1968	Caltex Racing Team	Brabham BT24	Repco 740 3.0 V8	RSA	ESP	MON	NED	BEL	FRA	GBR	GER; 12	CAN	ITA	USA	MEX	NC	0
1969	Ahrens Racing Team	Brabham BT30 (F2)	Ford Cosworth FVA 1.6 L4	RSA	ESP	MON	NED	FRA	GBR	GER; 7	CAN	ITA	USA	MEX		NC	0

=== Complete 24 Hours of Le Mans results ===
Year	Team	Co-Drivers	Car	Class	Laps	Pos.	Class Pos.
1969	(Germany) Porsche System Engineering	(Germany) Rolf Stommelen	Porsche 917L	S 5.0	148	DNF	DNF
1970	(Austria) Porsche KG Salzburg	(United Kingdom) Vic Elford	Porsche 917L	S 5.0	225	DNF	DNF
