= Brabham BT26 =

Formula One racing car

Brabham BT26 Brabham BT26A
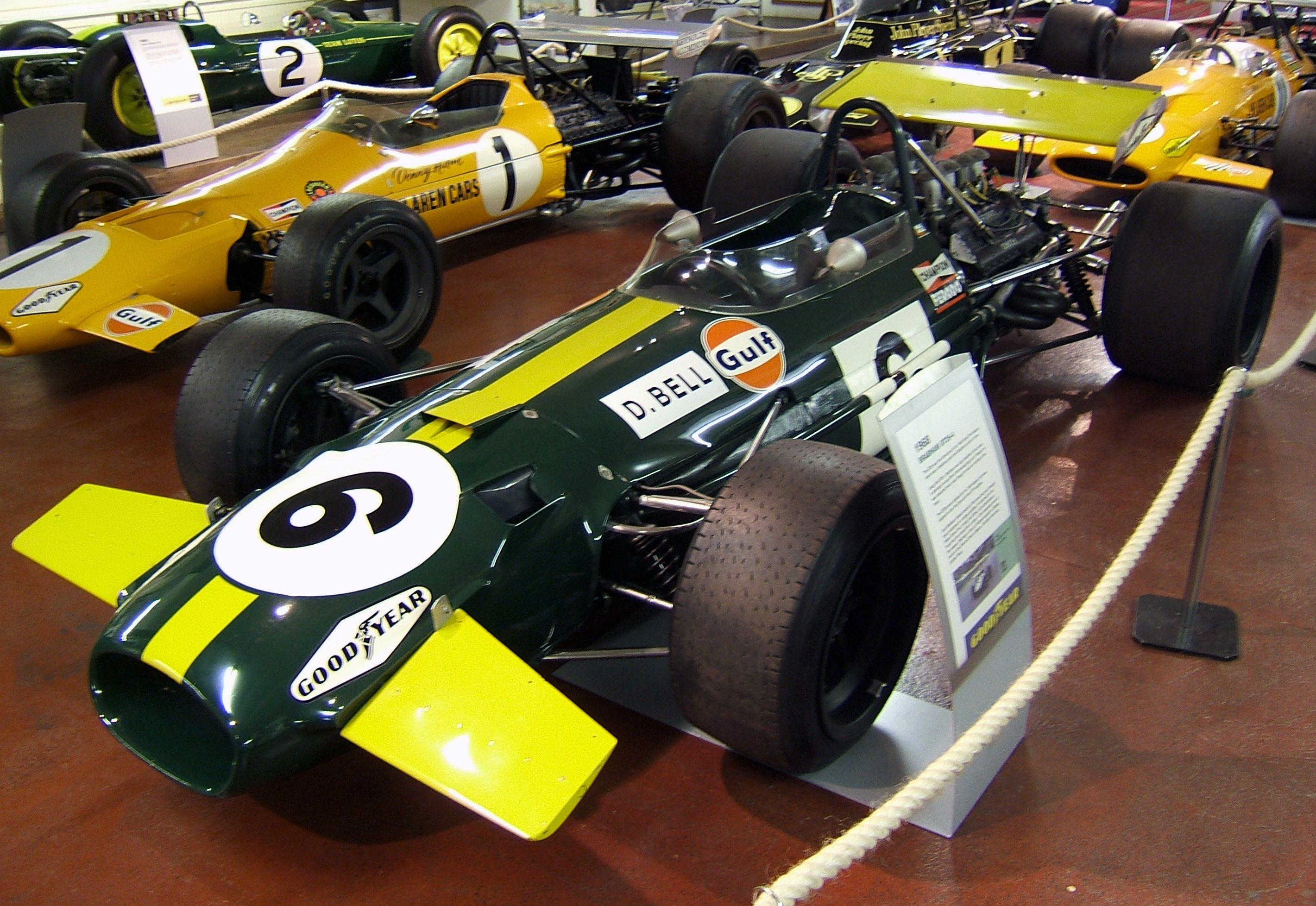
- A BT26 in Tasman Series configuration
- Category: Formula One
- Constructor: Motor Racing Developments
- Designer: Ron Tauranac
- Predecessor: Brabham BT24
- Successor: Brabham BT33

Technical specifications
- Chassis: Fibreglass body on tubular steel spaceframe with stressed skin sections
- Suspension (front): Double wishbones, coil springs over dampers, anti-roll bar
- Suspension (rear): Double wishbones, twin radius arms, coil springs over dampers, anti-roll bar
- Engine: BT26: Repco-Brabham RB860 2,996 cc (182.8 cu in); BT26A: Ford-Cosworth DFV 2,993 cc (182.6 cu in); 90° V8, NA, mid-engine, longitudinally mounted
- Transmission: Hewland DG 300, 5-speed manual, ZF differential
- Fuel: Esso
- Tyres: Goodyear, Dunlop

Competition history
- Notable entrants: Brabham Racing Organisation
- Notable drivers: (Australia) Jack Brabham (Austria) Jochen Rindt (Belgium) Jacky Ickx
- Debut: 1968 Spanish Grand Prix
| Races | Wins | Poles | F/Laps |
|---|---|---|---|
| 47 | 2 | 5 | 2 |
- Constructors' Championships: 0
- Drivers' Championships: 0

The Brabham BT26 was a Formula One racing car design. A development of the previous BT24, its Repco-Brabham RB860 engines were unreliable, but following a switch to Cosworth DFV engines it scored two World Championship Grand Prix wins and finished runner up in the 1969 World Constructors' Championship.

== Concept ==
Designed by Ron Tauranac, the BT26 was the final incarnation of his spaceframe F1 car, and one of the last F1 cars to be raced of such construction – forthcoming rule changes regarding fuel storage would outlaw spaceframe chassis. Tauranac had actually combined the spaceframe with stressed aluminium panels to create a semi-monocoque, enabling him to reduce the size of the spaceframe tubing and so lighten the chassis.

The other main difference between the BT24 and the BT26 was a more powerful Repco 860 series engine, but it was also less reliable; the 1968 season was plagued by a string of retirements and Jochen Rindt left to join Lotus. In 1969 the Repco engines were replaced with Cosworth DFV engines; these variants are designated BT26A.

== Racing history ==
In 1968 Rindt and Brabham between them managed only two finishes. 1969 saw an improvement; new recruit Jacky Ickx scored two wins and finished runner-up in the Driver's World Championship, and Brabham-Ford in the same position in the Constructor's Championship, with assistance from Piers Courage in a third car entered by Frank Williams' racing team.

With the Brabham team switching to the new BT33 in 1970, the BT26As were campaigned sporadically by privateer entries, with Peter de Klerk recording the best result, 11th (and last) at the South African Grand Prix. In 1971 Jackie Pretorius retired it from its final race in the South African Grand Prix.

In non-Championship events, Brabham won the 1969 BRDC International Trophy at Silverstone and Ickx won the 1969 Oulton Park International Gold Cup. de Klerk and Pretorius won three of the South African non-Championship races in 1970 and 1971.

In 1970 Derek Bell competed in the Tasman Series using a BT26A fitted with a Cosworth DFW, a 2.5 litre version of the DFV. Bell's best result was 2nd in the New Zealand Grand Prix, but engine troubles forced the cancellation of the Australian leg of the series.

== Complete Formula One World Championship results ==
(key) (results in bold indicate pole position; results in italics indicate fastest lap)

| Year | Entrant | Engine | Tyres | Driver | 1 | 2 | 3 | 4 | 5 | 6 | 7 | 8 | 9 | 10 | 11 | 12 | 13 | Points^{1} | WCC^{1} |
|---|---|---|---|---|---|---|---|---|---|---|---|---|---|---|---|---|---|---|---|
| 1968 | Brabham Racing Organisation | Repco-Brabham RB860 3.0 V8 | G | | RSA | ESP | MON | BEL | NED | FRA | GBR | GER | ITA | CAN | USA | MEX | | 10^{2} | 8th |
| 1968 | Brabham Racing Organisation | Repco-Brabham RB860 3.0 V8 | G | Jack Brabham | | DNS | Ret | Ret | Ret | Ret | Ret | 5 | Ret | Ret | Ret | Ret | | 10^{2} | 8th |
| 1968 | Brabham Racing Organisation | Repco-Brabham RB860 3.0 V8 | G | Jochen Rindt | | | | Ret | Ret | **Ret** | Ret | 3 | Ret | **Ret** | Ret | Ret | | 10^{2} | 8th |
| 1969 | Brabham Racing Organisation | Cosworth DFV | G | | RSA | ESP | MON | NED | FRA | GBR | GER | ITA | CAN | USA | MEX | | | **49 (51)** | **2nd** |
| 1969 | Brabham Racing Organisation | Cosworth DFV | G | Jack Brabham | Ret | Ret | Ret | 6 | | | | Ret | 2 | 4 | 3 | | | **49 (51)** | **2nd** |
| 1969 | Brabham Racing Organisation | Cosworth DFV | G | Jacky Ickx | Ret | 6 | Ret | 5 | 3 | 2 | **1** | 10 | **1** | Ret | 2 | | | **49 (51)** | **2nd** |
| 1969 | Frank Williams Racing Cars | Cosworth DFV | D | Piers Courage | | Ret | 2 | Ret | Ret | 5 | Ret | 5 | Ret | 2 | 10 | | | **49 (51)** | **2nd** |
| 1970 | Team Gunston | Cosworth DFV | G | | RSA | ESP | MON | BEL | NED | FRA | GBR | GER | AUT | ITA | CAN | USA | MEX | 35^{3} | 4th |
| 1970 | Team Gunston | Cosworth DFV | G | Peter de Klerk | 11 | | | | | | | | | | | | | 35^{3} | 4th |
| 1970 | Tom Wheatcroft Racing | Cosworth DFV | G | Derek Bell | | | | Ret | | | | | | | | | | 35^{3} | 4th |
| 1970 | Gus Hutchison | Cosworth DFV | G | Gus Hutchison | | | | | | | | | | | | Ret | | 35^{3} | 4th |
| 1971 | Team Gunston | Cosworth DFV | G | | RSA | ESP | MON | NED | FRA | GBR | GER | AUT | ITA | CAN | USA | | | 5^{3} | 9th |
| 1971 | Team Gunston | Cosworth DFV | G | Jackie Pretorius | 11 | | | | | | | | | | | | | 5^{3} | 9th |

^{1} Points were awarded on a 9–6–4–3–2–1 basis to the first six finishers at each round, but only the best placed car for each make was eligible to score points. The best five results from the first six and five from the last six were retained in 1968, the best five results from the first six rounds and the best four results from the last five rounds in 1969 and 1971 and the best six from the first seven and five from the last six in 1970.
^{2} In 1968, only 4 points were scored using the BT26. The remaining 6 points were scored using the BT20 and BT24.
^{3} All points scored in 1970 and 1971 using the BT33.
