= Brabham BT20 =

Formula One racing car

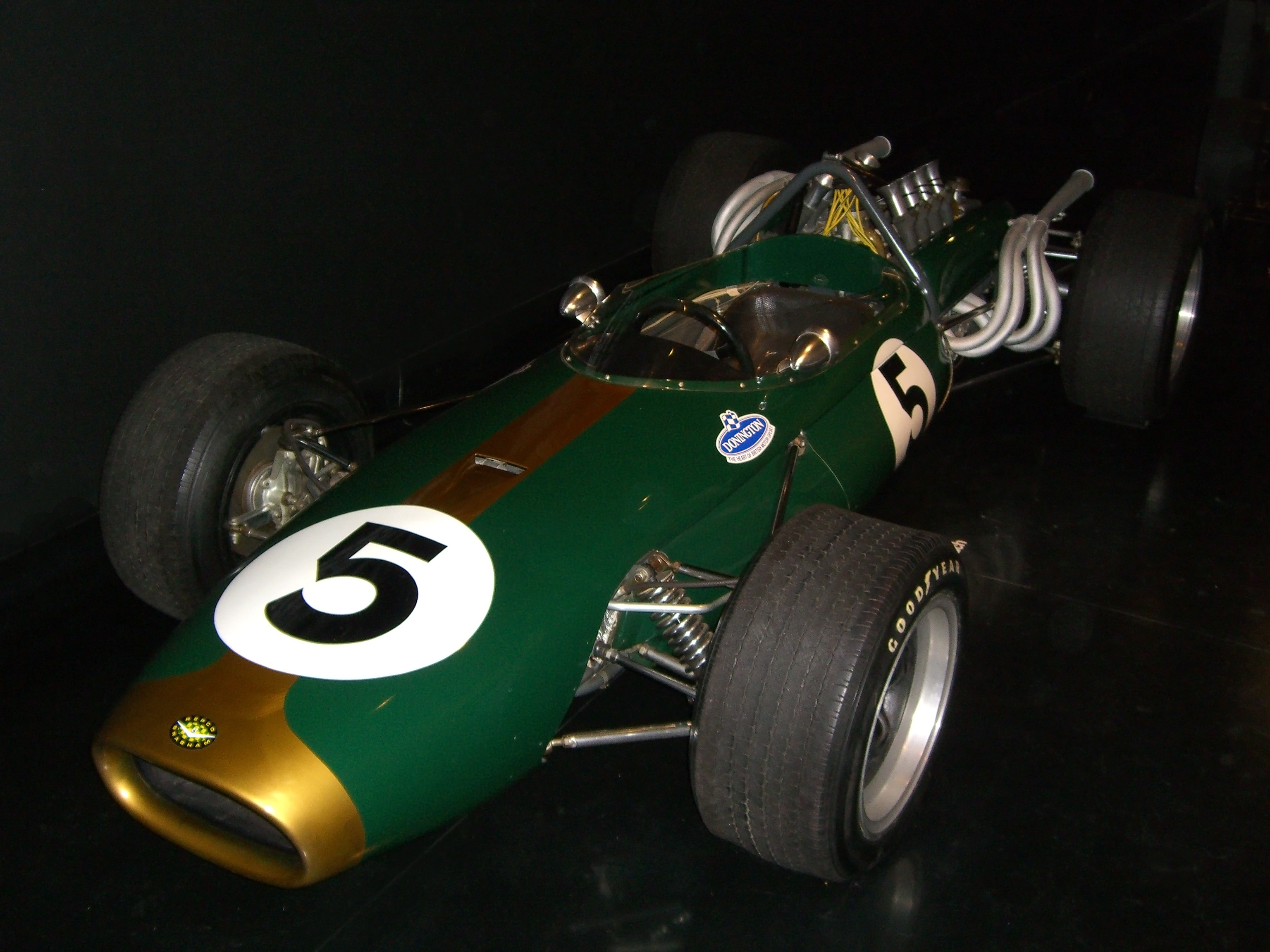
- Category: Formula One
- Constructor: Brabham
- Designer: Ron Tauranac
- Predecessor: BT19
- Successor: BT24

Technical specifications
- Chassis: Steel spaceframe, Fiberglass body
- Suspension (front): Double wishbones, coil springs over dampers, anti-roll bar
- Suspension (rear): Double wishbones, twin radius-arms, coil springs over dampers, anti-roll bar
- Engine: Repco-Brabham RB620; Repco-Brabham RB740; Repco-Brabham RB860 2,996 cc (182.8 cu in) 90° V8 NA mid-engined, longitudinally mounted
- Transmission: Hewland 5 speed MT
- Weight: 560 kg (1,235 lb)
- Tyres: Goodyear; Firestone

Competition history
- Notable entrants: Brabham
- Notable drivers: (Australia) Jack Brabham (New Zealand) Denny Hulme (France) Guy Ligier (Rhodesia) John Love (Switzerland) Silvio Moser (South Africa) Peter de Klerk
- Debut: 1966 French Grand Prix
Races	Wins	Podiums	Poles	F/Laps
22	1	7	2	1
- Unless otherwise stated, all data refer to Formula One World Championship Grands Prix only.

The Brabham BT20 is a Formula One car used by the Brabham Formula One team in 1966 and 1967, as well as a number of privateers from 1967 to 1969. The BT20 was the direct successor to the Brabham BT19 which was driven to the World Constructors' title in 1966.

The BT20 was driven in 7 out of the 9 races of Brabham's Constructors' Championship winning season in 1966, and the first three races en route to another championship in 1967.

The BT20 was very successful in these seasons, scoring 7 podiums and one win (at the 1967 Monaco Grand Prix) in its first 10 entries.

The BT20 was succeeded by the Brabham BT24.

== Complete Formula One World Championship results ==
(key) (results in bold indicate pole position; results in italics indicate fastest lap)

Year	Entrant	Engine	Tyres	Drivers	1	2	3	4	5	6	7	8	9	10	11	12	Points	WCC
1966	Brabham Racing Organisation	Repco-Brabham RB620 3.0 V8	G		MON	BEL	FRA	GBR	NED	GER	ITA	USA	MEX				42 (49)**	**1st**
1966	Brabham Racing Organisation	Repco-Brabham RB620 3.0 V8	G	Denny Hulme			3	2	Ret	Ret	3	Ret	3				42 (49)**	**1st**
1966	Brabham Racing Organisation	Repco-Brabham RB620 3.0 V8	G	Jack Brabham								**Ret**	2				42 (49)**	**1st**
1967	Brabham Racing Organisation	Repco-Brabham RB620/740 3.0 V8	G		RSA	MON	NED	BEL	FRA	GBR	GER	CAN	ITA	USA	MEX		63 (67)**	**1st**
1967	Brabham Racing Organisation	Repco-Brabham RB620/740 3.0 V8	G	Jack Brabham	**6**												63 (67)**	**1st**
1967	Brabham Racing Organisation	Repco-Brabham RB620/740 3.0 V8	G	Denny Hulme	4	1	3										63 (67)**	**1st**
1967	Guy Ligier	Repco-Brabham RB620/740 3.0 V8	F	Guy Ligier						10	8*		Ret	Ret	11		63 (67)**	**1st**
1968	Team Gunston	Repco-Brabham RB860 3.0 V8	F		RSA	ESP	MON	BEL	NED	FRA	GBR	GER	ITA	CAN	USA	MEX	10**	**8th**
1968	Team Gunston	Repco-Brabham RB860 3.0 V8	F	John Love	9												10**	**8th**
1968	Charles Vögele Racing	Repco-Brabham RB860 3.0 V8	G	Silvio Moser			DNQ		5		NC		DNQ				10**	**8th**
1969	Jack Holme	Repco-Brabham RB860 3.0 V8	G		RSA	ESP	MON	NED	FRA	GBR	GER	ITA	CAN	USA	MEX		**0**	-
1969	Jack Holme	Repco-Brabham RB860 3.0 V8	G	Peter de Klerk	NC												**0**	-

* Ligier finished 8th in the 1967 German Grand Prix, but was awarded the point for 6th place as the two F2 drivers who finished ahead of him on the road were ineligible to score points

** Only 6 of the points which counted towards Brabham-Repco's 1966 Championship total were scored using the BT20; the remainder were scored using the BT19. Only 13 of the points which counted towards Brabham-Repco's 1967 Championship total were scored using the BT20; the remainder were scored using the BT19 and BT24. Only 2 of Brabham-Repco's 1968 points were scored using the BT20; the remainder were scored using the BT24 and BT26.
