= Brabham BT24 =

Formula One racing car

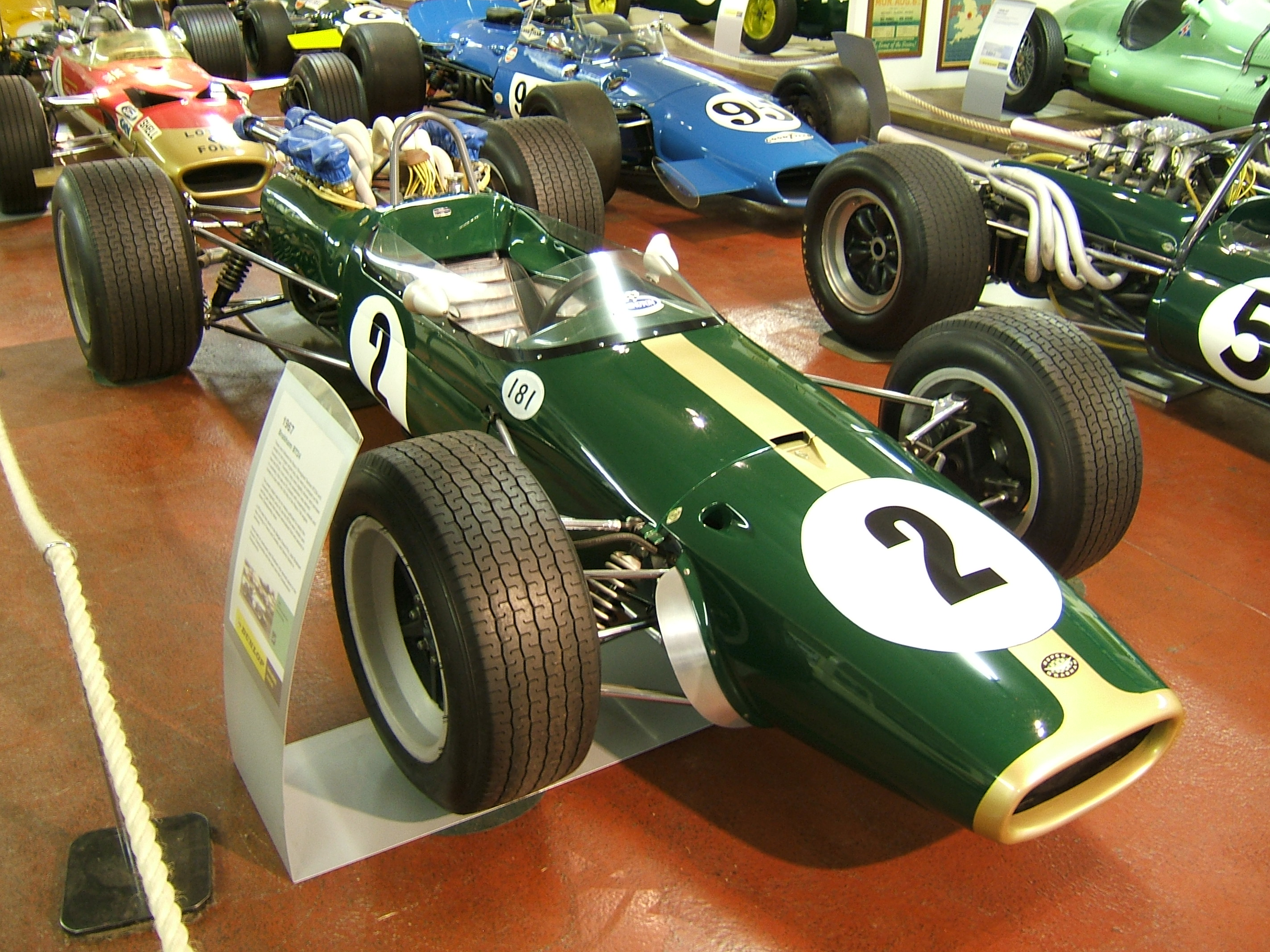
- Category: Formula One
- Constructor: Motor Racing Developments
- Designer: Ron Tauranac
- Predecessor: BT20
- Successor: BT26

Technical specifications
- Chassis: Fibreglass body on tubular steel spaceframe
- Suspension (front): Double wishbones, coil springs over dampers, anti-roll bar
- Suspension (rear): Double wishbones, twin radius arms, coil springs over dampers, anti-roll bar
- Engine: Repco RB740, 2,996 cc (182.8 cu in), 90° V8, NA, mid-engine, longitudinally mounted
- Transmission: Hewland DG 300, 5-speed manual, ZF differential
- Fuel: Esso
- Tyres: Goodyear

Competition history
- Notable entrants: Brabham Racing Organisation
- Notable drivers: (Australia) Jack Brabham (New Zealand) Denny Hulme (Austria) Jochen Rindt (United States) Dan Gurney
- Debut: 1967 Belgian Grand Prix
Races	Wins	Podiums	Poles	F/Laps
21	3	12	0	1
- Constructors' Championships: 1 (1967)
- Drivers' Championships: 1 (1967); Denny Hulme

The Brabham BT24 was a Formula One racing car design. It was one of three cars used by the Brabham racing team during their championship-winning 1967 Formula One season. Only three chassis were ever raced.

== Concept ==
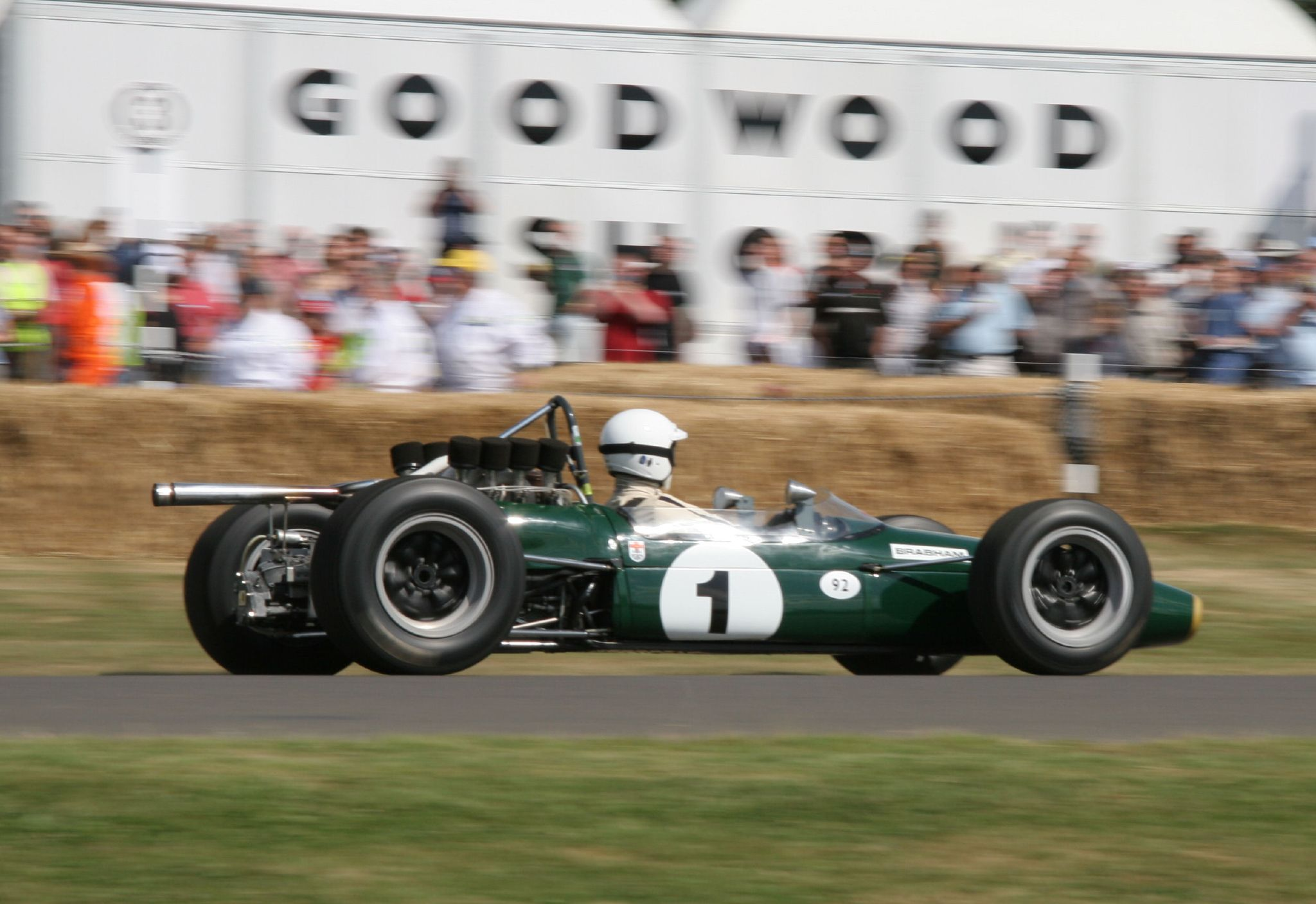
a Brabham BT24 in action during the 2006 Goodwood Festival of Speed

Designed by Ron Tauranac, the BT24 was based on the BT23 Formula Two car and was notably light and compact. Tauranac continued to adhere to the space frame chassis, alone of Formula One designers. The BT24 was designed to take the new Repco-Brabham RB740 V8 engine, which was an all new design entirely built by Repco, unlike the previous years' 620 series engines that used Oldsmobile cylinder block. Tauranac had requested that Repco build the engine with in vee exhausts to reduce frontal area and ease the problem of threading exhaust pipes through the rear suspension links. Like the Lotus 49 the BT24 made its first appearance during practice for the Dutch Grand Prix, and in comparison the Brabham seemed almost obsolete, but as the season progressed, its better reliability made it the tortoise to Lotus's hare. Brabham decided to run its proven 1966 cars in the Dutch race (although by this time Jack Brabham's BT19 was equipped with the centre exhaust 740 engine) and the BT24 made its race debut one race later at the Belgian Grand Prix.

With reigning champion Jack Brabham and Denny Hulme at the wheel, the BT24 took 3 wins to Jim Clark's 4 in the Lotus, but with six 2nd places, two 3rds, a 4th and a 5th the Brabham team comfortably took the Constructors' Championship, while Hulme pipped team-owner Brabham to the Drivers' Championship by 5 points.

In addition to its three championship race wins the BT24 also won the prestigious 1967 International Gold Cup at Oulton Park in the hands of Jack Brabham.

== Later years ==
The original two chassis were raced by Brabham and Rindt in the season opening 1968 South African Grand Prix, but with the BT26 ready in time for the next race, these two chassis were sold to local teams and left in South Africa, with Sam Tingle and Basil van Rooyen finishing third and fourth in that year's South African Formula One Championship. Sam Tingle later took part in the 1969 South African Grand Prix, the last World Championship Formula One event for a standard BT24, and continued to race his chassis with some success in local events as late as January 1970, while van Rooyen's car was also raced at various times by Gordon Henderson and Ivor Robertson.

A third BT24 chassis had been built at the end of 1967 but was only used in three races by the Brabham team, twice for Rindt and once for a one-off appearance by Dan Gurney. Kurt Ahrens Jr. hired the car from Brabham and entered the 1968 German Grand Prix, before it was acquired by Frank Williams and modified to take BT26-style wings and a 2.5 litre Cosworth DVW V8 for the 1969 Tasman Series. Piers Courage drove in all seven races, winning at Teretonga Park in New Zealand and finishing second, third and fourth with three retirements in the other races to finish third in the final points standings.

Self-entrant Silvio Moser then acquired the car, having arranged for Williams to switch the engine for a 1968-spec 3.0 litre DFV, as well adding extra fuel tanks on account of the thirstier engine. Silvio raced this unique car in 7 of the 11 rounds of the 1969 Formula One season, his best result coming at Watkins Glen where he finished 6th, and he also used the car in the International Gold Cup and two rounds of the European Hillclimb Championship.

== Aftermath and legacy ==
In 1969, Hot Wheels released a 1/64 die-cast model of the car under the name "Brabham Repco F1" in the Grand Prix series. It loosely resembles this car.

The Brabham BT24 was featured as a playable vehicle in Forza Motorsport.

== Complete Formula One World Championship results ==
(key) (results in bold indicate pole position; results in italics indicate fastest lap)

Year	Entrant	Engine	Tyres	Driver	1	2	3	4	5	6	7	8	9	10	11	12	Points^{†}	WCC^{†}
1967	Brabham Racing Organisation	Repco-Brabham RB740 3.0 V8	G		RSA	MON	NED	BEL	FRA	GBR	GER	CAN	ITA	USA	MEX		**63 (67)***	**1st**
1967	Brabham Racing Organisation	Repco-Brabham RB740 3.0 V8	G	Jack Brabham				Ret	1	4	2	1	2	5	2		**63 (67)***	**1st**
1967	Brabham Racing Organisation	Repco-Brabham RB740 3.0 V8	G	Denny Hulme					2	2	1	2	Ret	3	3		**63 (67)***	**1st**
1968	Brabham Racing Organisation	Repco-Brabham RB740 3.0 V8	G		RSA	ESP	MON	BEL	NED	FRA	GBR	GER	ITA	CAN	USA	MEX	10**	8th
1968	Brabham Racing Organisation	Repco-Brabham RB740 3.0 V8	G	Jack Brabham	Ret												10**	8th
1968	Brabham Racing Organisation	Repco-Brabham RB740 3.0 V8	G	Jochen Rindt	3	Ret	Ret										10**	8th
1968	Brabham Racing Organisation	Repco-Brabham RB740 3.0 V8	G	Dan Gurney					Ret								10**	8th
1968	Caltex Racing Team	Repco-Brabham RB740 3.0 V8	D	Kurt Ahrens Jr.								12					10**	8th
1969	Team Gunston	Repco-Brabham RB620 3.0 V8	F		RSA	ESP	MON	NED	FRA	GBR	GER	ITA	CAN	USA	MEX		0	NC
1969	Team Gunston	Repco-Brabham RB620 3.0 V8	F	Sam Tingle	8												0	NC
1969	Silvio Moser Racing Team	Ford Cosworth DFV 3.0 V8	G	Silvio Moser			Ret	Ret	7			Ret	Ret	6	11		**49 (51)**^{^}	**2nd**

^{†} Points were awarded on a 9-6-4-3-2-1 basis to the first six finishers at each round, but only the best placed car for each make was eligible to score points. The best five results from the first six rounds and the best four results from the last five rounds were retained in 1967 and 1969, and five from the first six and five from the last six in 1968.
* 18 points in 1967 were scored using the BT19 and BT20 models.
** Only 4 points were scored in 1968 using the BT24.
^{^} All Brabham-Ford WCC points in 1969 were scored by Brabham BT26 variants.
