= Repco-Brabham V8 =

Series of V8 racing engines

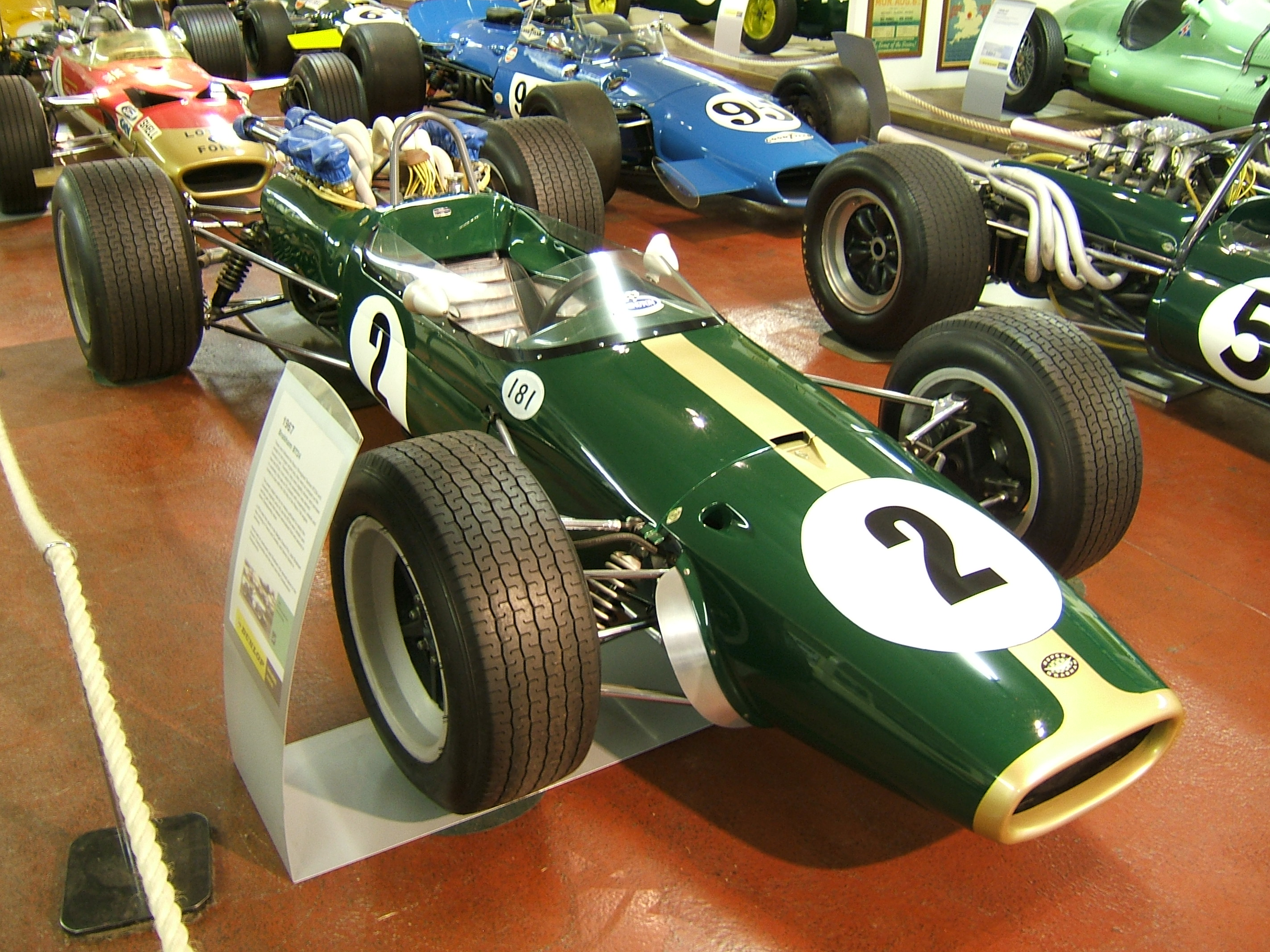
- RB740 on Brabham BT24 on the left, RB620 on Brabham BT19 on the right, at Donington Park

Overview
- Manufacturer: Repco-Brabham Engines Pty. Ltd.
- Production: 1965–1970

Layout
- Configuration: Naturally aspirated V8
- Displacement: 2.5 L (2,497 cc); 2.8 L (2,799 cc); 3.0 L (2,996 cc) (Note: Nye (1973a) claims 88.9mm bore x 60.3mm stroke for 2,994cc displacement for the 3.0L version.); 4.2 L (4,194 cc); 4.4 L (4,415 cc); 5.0 L ( n.a. (Note: 5.0L version was produced in 1969-1970 but the stroke and actual displacement are unknown (possibly 98.0 mm and 4,988cc).))
- Cylinder bore: 85.0 mm (2.5L); 3.500 in (others); 90.0 mm (2.8 & 5.0L)
- Piston stroke: 55.0 mm (2.5 & 2.8L); 2.375 in (3.0L) (Note: Some sources incorrectly claim a 2.55" stroke.); 3.325 in (4.2L); 3.500 in (4.4L) n.a. (5.0L)
- Cylinder block material: Cast aluminium, or, magnesium alloy
- Valvetrain: SOHC 2 valves per cylinder DOHC 4 valves per cylinder
- Compression ratio: 11.0:1 - 12.0:1 (Note: Heavily leaded 130 octane aviation fuel (AvGas). See Progression of regulations)

RPM range
- Max. engine speed: 9,000rpm (2.5L); 8,500 rpm (3.0L); 7,000 rpm (SOHC4.4L); 7,500 rpm (DOHC5.0L)

Combustion
- Fuel system: Lucas Mechanical Port injection
- Fuel type: Petrol
- Cooling system: Water-cooled

Output
- Power output: 285 bhp (213 kW) (2.5L) (Note: 275bhp on RB620, 295bhp on RB860); 330 bhp (250 kW) (3.0L); 400 bhp (300 kW) (4.4L); 460 bhp (340 kW) (5.0L)

Dimensions
- Dry weight: 150 kg (330 lb) (2.5L); 159 kg (350 lb) (3.0L); 163 kg (360 lb) (SOHC5.0L); 172 kg (380 lb) (DOHC5.0L)

Repco-Brabham as a Formula One engine manufacturer
- Official name(s): Repco-Brabham Engines Pty. Ltd.

Formula One World Championship career
- First entry: 1966 Monaco Grand Prix
- Last entry: 1969 South African Grand Prix
- Races entered: 33
- Chassis: Brabham, LDS
- Constructors' Championships: 2 (1966, 1967)
- Drivers' Championships: 2 (1966, 1967)
- Race victories: 8
- Podiums: 25
- Points: 126
- Pole positions: 7
- Fastest laps: 4

The Repco-Brabham V8 engines are a series of V8 piston engines for racing in 2.5L to 5.0L displacement. This engine family features a flat-plane crankshaft with an aluminium or magnesium alloy engine block, as well as dry-sump lubrication. These engines were produced by Repco-Brabham Engines in Australia from 1965 to 1970.

== Background ==
The Formula One regulation on maximum engine capacity was changed from 2.5 litres to 1.5 litres by the Commission Sportive Internationale (CSI) of FIA starting with the 1961 season, despite protests from the British entrants, constructors and engine suppliers. As a result, these British interests supported a new, alternative Intercontinental Formula, which had an upper capacity limit of 3 litres. The Intercontinental Formula was abandoned at the end of 1961 after the British failed to convince the Americans and others to join the revolt. Intercontinental Formula style racing continued In Australia and New Zealand where Formula Libre rules applied until the introduction of a 2.5 litre limit for the newly instituted Tasman Championship in 1964.

Repco is an Australian engineering company with a wide array of products and services in the automotive industry. Jack Brabham (knighted OBE in 1966) was friends with Phil Irving, a senior engineer at Repco. Together with another Repco engineer, Michael Gasking, this relationship grew into Repco's importing and servicing the Climax engines in 1962, and later producing Climax FPF engines in Australia. When they decided to build a racing engine of their own design with some input from Ron Tauranac, Repco-Brabham Engines Pty. Ltd. (RBE) was established by Repco in April 1964 at 81 Burnley Street (corner of Burnley and Doonside Streets), Richmond, and moved to 87 Mitchell Street, Maidstone, Victoria in December 1964.

In 1964, CSI agreed on increasing the Formula One engine capacity from 1.5 to 3.0L beginning with the 1966 season.

The people responsible included Bob Brown (Repco director in charge of RBE), Frank Hallam (RBE manager), Phil Irving (Chief engineer), Peter Hollinger (Production engineer), Stan Johnson (Commercial manager), Kevin Davies (Factory/production manager), Michael Gasking (Chief of assembly and testing), Howard Ring (Engineer), David Nash (Senior machinist), John Mepstead (Senior machinist), Geoff Walker (Machinist), Graeme Bartils (Assembly engineer/mechanic), Nigel Tait (Machinist), and Rodway Wolfe (Machinist).

== Prototypes ==
The initial six cylinder-heads for three engines (Note: The SOHC heads were interchangeable between the left and the right bank.) were cast in England by Sterling Metals and machined by HRG. These were used for 2.5L E1 and E2 as well as 3.0L E3 prototype engines. The entire series of engines, including prototypes and production, was serially stamped starting with 'E1'. The E1 was fired up on 21 March 1965, 51 weeks after Phil Irving commenced its design. Initially tested with Weber 32IDM, the E1 produced 235 bhp (175 kW) at 8,200rpm on Heenan and Froude GB4 dynamometer in Cell 4 at the Repco Engine Laboratory facility in Russell, Richmond.
The E3 made 285 bhp (213 kW) at 8,000rpm with longitudinally-mounted four Weber 40IDA down-draft double-choke carburettors, borrowed from Bib Stillwell, on vertically-faced intake ports, with the initial valve timing of 53/77/70/63°. The prototypes used a Coventry Climax FWB flywheel.

The E2 and E3 were re-assembled with '20' series production fuel injection heads and became RB620. RB620-E2 was used at Sandown and Longford, 27 February - 7 March 1966. E3 became RB620-E3C and was raced at East London, 1 - 2 January 1966.

== RB620 ==
=== Background ===
As a result of discussions between Phil Irving and Jack Brabham, who was impressed by Dan Gurney's Indy 500 debut performance (qualified 8th as a rookie) with a GM alloy stock block on 12 May 1962, (Note: How this 4.2L methanol engine, used on Harvey Aluminum Special, was designed and by whom, are different in Mickey Thompson's and a Buick executive's recollections. However, this gear-driven camshaft OHV engine had six head-studs per cylinder, so it is unlikely to have been based on the Buick 215 production block of the period. (Note: The Buick 215 block did not have the cast-in boss for the sixth stud. The Oldsmobile F85 block with extra meat to support the sixth stud was made common between the two GM divisions later (Buick 215 engine production facilities were sold to Rover in 1965 (Note: See Rover V8 engine for details.)).) An OHV aluminium block V8 racing engine of a very similar design (not in the vertical intake stacks style the 4.2L was used at 1962 Indy but with the side draft intake manifold format) was built by Frank Coon and Jim Travers (of later Traco Engineering fame) at Reventlow Automobiles Inc. as a 'Buick' 3.9L gasoline engine with four Weber '58'DCO side draft carbs (Methanol fuel injection made by Stu Hilborn (Note: who was close to Travers and Coon) was used at Indy 500.) for Scarab RE single seater driven by Chuck Daigh beating Stirling Moss and Jim Clark at 1962 Sandown International Cup on 12 March 1962. This car was also noticed and visually inspected by Brabham, who won the Sandown event. Later aluminium block Traco V8 racing engines were named Traco-Oldsmobile.) the initial RB620 was mostly designed by Irving at an apartment close to the Brabham Racing Organisation facility in Clapham, London. This version had the displacement of 2.5, 3.0, or 4.4L. The cylinder block was from Oldsmobile F85 with 18 head studs per bank, not the similar Buick 215 block with 14. (Note: Rodway Wolfe wrote "It used to annoy all of us when our engine was referred to as ‘based on a Buick’ in various world motoring magazines.")

The Oldsmobile block was cast in aluminium alloy (GM 4097-M, 11-13% Silicon, 1% Copper) with 4.240" bore centres and eight 3.500" centrifugal-cast iron cylinder liners of 0.1875" thickness (with 0.010" deep serrations on the outside for a better bonding) cast-in during the pouring process. Twenty-six partially assembled Oldsmobile blocks with cast production crossplane crankshaft were purchased from GM via Holden. (Note: McLaren-Elva Mark II and IIB also used this Olds alloy block, but switched to the Chevrolet iron block of a larger capacity soon after.)

=== Engine ===
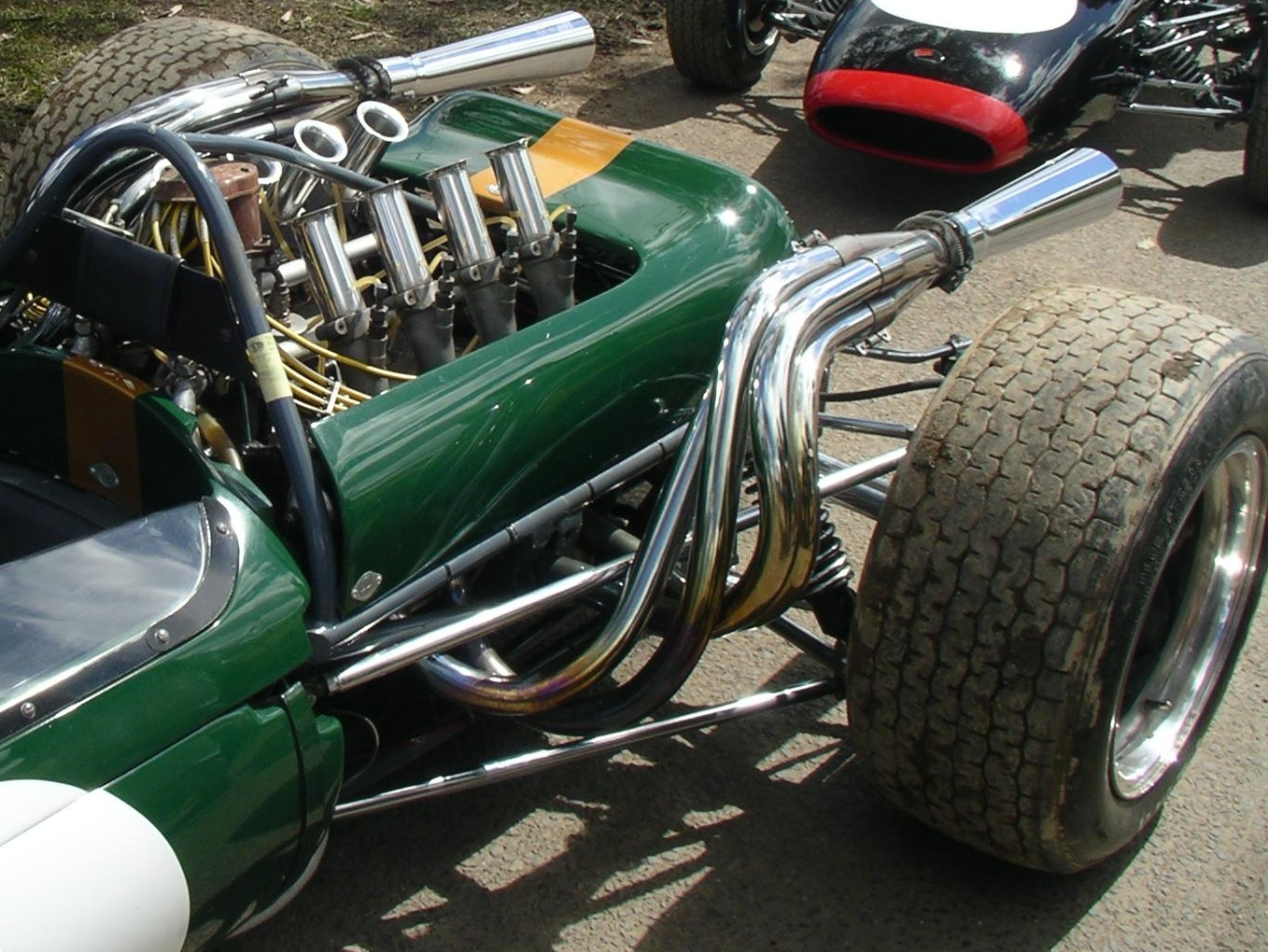
3.0L RB620 on Brabham BT19 (Note: Picture of the first 'customer' engine, 4.4L version RB620 on Elfin 400 by S.Lambert is here.)

The crankshaft was an EN40 nitrided forged steel unit custom-made by Laystall Engineering Co. Ltd. (Note: See About Laystall for info.) in England according to Irving's specifications, always in flatplane configuration but with different strokes depending on the displacement. Main journal diameter was 2.30" and the big-end journal was 2.00". The 6.30" centre-to-centre connecting rods were from 2.5L Daimler V8 lightened and balanced, and later were made in-house for the 700 and 800 series. (Note: Later drawings for in-house production show 5.700" centre-to-centre for 'RB720' and 5.100" centre-to-centre for 'RB840' engines (displacements unknown).) Pistons (A143 aluminium silicon alloy, made by Russell Manufacturing Co. Pty. Ltd., a Repco subsidiary), piston rings, main and conrod bearings (by Repco Bearing Co.) were manufactured by Repco.

The crankshaft drives an intermediary shaft (jackshaft) with a single-row chain, that drives a water pump at the axis location of the original Oldsmobile OHV camshaft, which in turn drives the two camshafts with another single-row chain made by Morse in the US. The sprockets, including one for another jackshaft at the top centre position (that drives the distributor inside the 'V' angle) pressing down the chain in the middle of the left and the right camshafts, and one for a chain tensioner (SCD built, standard BMC unit), and another for the crankshaft, were all made at Repco.

The intake (1.625", Silicon-Chromium steel) and exhaust valves (1.375", austenite steel), both with the stem diameter of 5/16", were manufactured by an Australian company, Dreadnaught, and are positioned in-line, canted 10-degrees inward from the 45-degrees canted cylinder axis. Duplex coil valve springs were used at 82 Lbs on the seat installed, and 220 Lbs at the full lift of 0.40" for the combined spring rate of 345 Lbs/in.(WP:CALC) The cam-follower bucket was an Alfa Romeo part.

A stiffener steel plate of 3/16" thickness in ladder form was added to the bottom of the block, being sandwiched by a Repco-made ribbed cast aluminium oil sump of 3-1/2" height. The oil sump incorporated pressure and scavenge oil pumps with oil draining at the front-end and rear-end of the sump. An inertia valve opened the rear drain port and closed the front port during acceleration, then opened the front port and closed the rear port during braking, ensuring effective scavenging under either condition.

The fuel supply management was a Lucas mechanical fuel injection with throttle slide plates for production. The '20' series head (Note: here is a picture of '20' series head showing the slider plate linkage, distributor, injectors, and a tachometer drive at the rear end of the right side camshaft.) had a throttle slide-plate with four bores mounted directly on the intake ports of the head, which incorporated four slider rollers for each plate within the head, with inward-canted trumpets mounted on top. The ignition system (two contact point distributor with single spark plug, except RB850 with twin-plug) was sourced by Brabham from Bosch GmbH.

The 2.5L engines had 85mm bore x 55mm stroke for a displacement of 2,496.78cc. For these engines, the cast-in iron cylinder liners of the Oldsmobile block were bored out, and metric Repco cast iron cylinder liners of 2.5mm wall thickness were inserted.
The 3.0L (for F1) and 4.4L (for Group A Sports Cars) versions used the original liners in the block with their 3.500" bore until a race in 1966 when one liner failed. The broken liner was bored out, and casting cavities were found where the block meets the liner. Repco dry liners were used after the imperfections welded and fixed from that point on. The dry sleeves caused blow-by issues on the 4.4L version due to distortion, until they were replaced with wet liners on '700' and '800' series blocks.

=== Results ===
The fuel-injected 2.5L version was run by Jack Brabham on Brabham BT19 at the 1966 Tasman Series event at Sandown on 27 February, then finished 3rd at Longford a week later on 7 March 1966.

The 3.0L engines, also with fuel injection, had 3.5" bore x 2.375" stroke, and was debuted by Jack Brabham on Brabham BT19 at the 1966 South African Grand Prix on 1 January 1966 gaining pole position, and set the fastest lap before retiring from the race on the next day due to fuel injection failure, and then at 1966 Monaco Grand Prix on 22 May 1966. This engine was used on Brabham BT19 and Brabham BT20 for the rest of 1966 Formula One season, making Jack Brabham the world champion, as well as making Brabham-Repco (Note: The F1 chassis constructor Motor Racing Developments (MRD, co-founded by Jack Brabham and Ron Tauranac) led by Ron Tauranac in England, and the engine maker Repco-Brabham Engines in Australia, not the F1 entrant (team) Brabham Racing Organisation. Because of an arrangement between Jack Brabham and Repco, many racing cars made by MRD in the period (sometimes with a Climax engine) were named "Brabham Repco", further confusing the matter.) the winner of International Cup for F1 Manufacturers. The 3.0L RB620 was also used in the 1967 Formula One season on BT19 and BT20.

The 4.4L sports car engines (400bhp @7,000rpm) were run by Bob Jane and Frank Matich on Elfin 400 in 1967 and 1968. Frank Matich also used this engine on Matich SR3 for the 1967 Can-Am season in the US and Canada, and then won the 1968 Australian Tourist Trophy.

== RB640 ==
=== Background ===
Phil Irving had experiences with the 'Heron' type combustion chamber, notably on Bob Chamberlain's boat engine, which utilized a 132.5ci version (nicknamed "The Grey Motor") of the Holden 48/215 (introduced in 1948 as a 215ci, inline six-cylinder engine producing 60bhp at 3,800rpm). This engine, in turn, was based on the GM Project 195-Y15, designed in 1938 and produced in Fisherman's Bend, Melbourne.
Chamberlain was using the Grey Motor, which produced about 90bhp, but it was unable to pull skiers at the desired speeds. Phil Irving worked with him to design an improvement with increased displacement of 186ci and Heron combustion chamber, utilizing the original two siamesed and two independent intake ports, and three siamesed exhaust ports for a total of seven ports, all on the left side. Repco produced the result (6 with cast iron head and 25 with cast alloy head) from 1966 to 1970, with three SU carburettors and the Heron head dubbed "Cyclone Cylinder Head", which produced 150bhp.

=== Engine ===
Incorporating this development work, the '40' series cylinderhead (Note: Picture of '40' series head on RB740 (on Denny Hulme's BT24) with its cam cover off by Laymon.) had the Heron arrangement, where the bottoms of valves and head are flat, against which pistons with a combustion chamber recess carved into the top are used. The head had SOHC 2 valves per cylinder with vertical valve angle (canted 45-degrees on the 90-degree V engine) for the Heron design. The 10-degrees valve angle difference made the width of the engine larger than the BT19 limit of 21 inches, at the same time provided more space on the inside of the V angle. This increased space was used to relocate exhaust ports from outside the V angle to inside, reducing the frontal area of the Brabham BT22.

Because Ron Tauranac and Jack Brabham preferred to have the exhaust on the inside of the V angle, the '40' series heads were used in races before the '30' series heads, until it was established that the '30' series heads produced more power.

=== Results ===
This engine, in 2.5L format, was used by Jack Brabham and Denny Hulme on Brabham BT22 and Brabham BT23A during the 1967 Tasman Series races (and at non-championship Levin International in New Zealand), placing Brabham 2nd, and Hulme 8th for the season. Also, Leo Geoghegan used this engine on Lotus 39 and won Australian Gold Star Race at Sandown Park on 17 September 1967. Brabham's BT23A was used by Greg Cusack to win the Australian Gold Star Race at Symmons Plains on 12 November 1967.

== RB730 ==
In 1966, the '700' series block was designed in-house and cast by Commonwealth Aircraft Corporation, which replaced the single-row primary chain drive from the crankshaft to the jackshaft above with a duplex chain/sprockets. The gear drive to another jackshaft below the crank driving the oil pumps, and the single row chain on the intermediary shaft driving the camshafts, were retained. Conrod was made in-house with EN15R steel at least in 6.300" centre-to-centre length, however, it is not known if this size was only for the 2.5L versions, or for 3.0L versions as well.

'700' series block had cross-bolted main bearing caps and the vertical main studs running the height of the block up to the valley of the V, where they were clamped with nuts after the main cap nuts are torqued. These measures and the elimination of the holes for OHV tappets and pushrods, as well as the steel stiffener plate, resulted in an overall 30 Lbs lighter block with increased rigidity. The '700' and '800' series blocks had Repco wet cylinder liners.

The '30' series head (two-valve SOHC) with 10-degrees inward canted valve angle had the exhaust on the outside of the V, the same as the '20' series head, but with a Lucas self-contained slide throttle unit mounted on a short intake manifold cast in the head, similar to the initial six prototype heads, eliminating the slider mechanism for the throttle plate on the cylinderhead. A shorter intake trumpet was used on top of the throttle assembly.

== RB740 ==
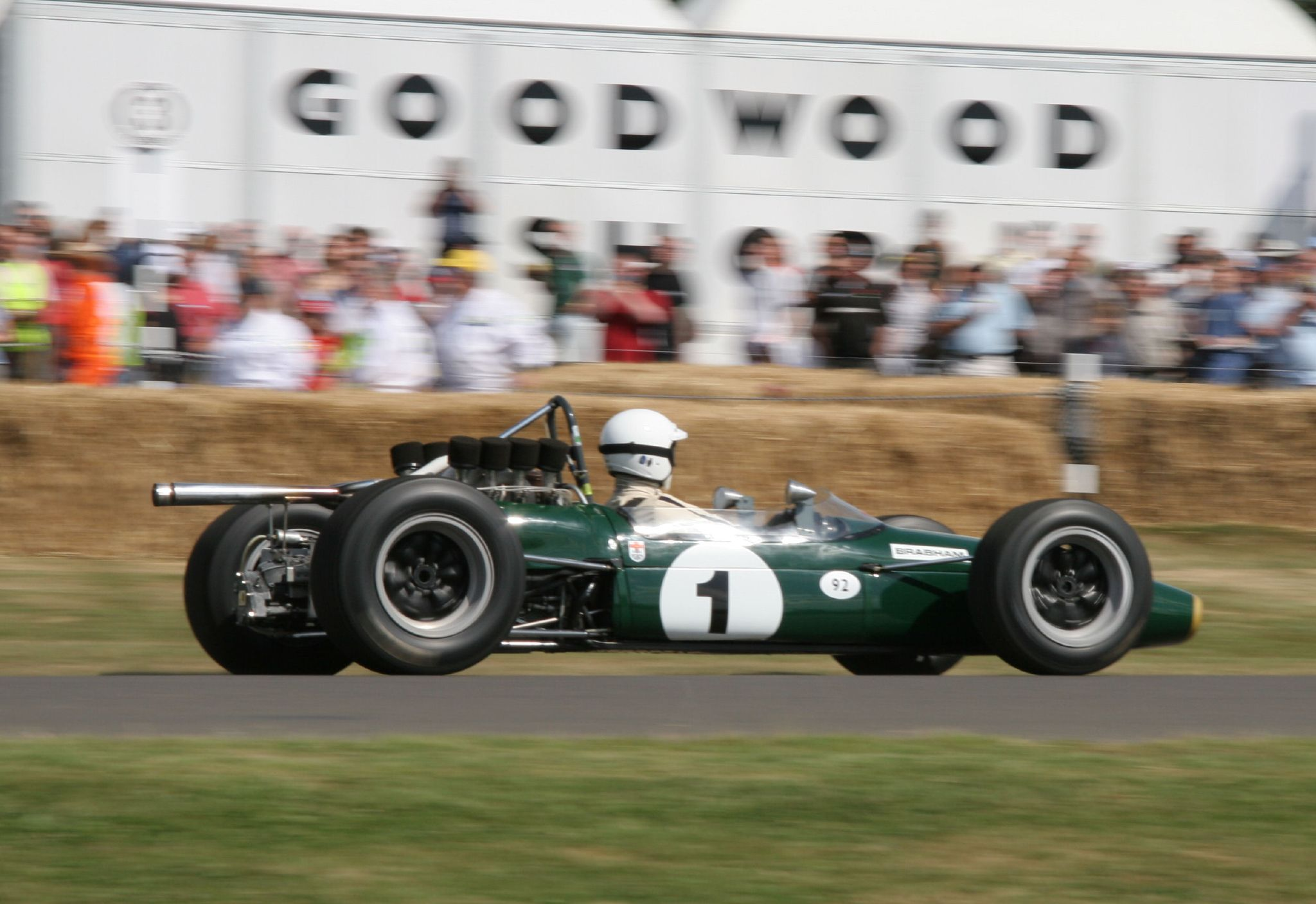
Brabham BT24 with 3.0L RB740 with exhaust pipes inside of the V

=== Background ===
Brabham Racing Organisation engineer, John Judd (ex-Coventry Climax, sometimes remotely from London), and Norman Wilson joined Repco-Brabham Engines in 1966 and worked on improvements for the 1967 season. This was followed by Phil Irving's departure, and Lindsay Hooper as well as Brian Heard joining the team in 1967.

=== Engine ===
RB740 still had its pistons, rings, and main bearings made by Repco, but the new Repco-made conrods used Vandervell big-end bearings. The '40' series head had 1-13/16 in. intake and 1-1/2 in. exhaust valves, and the exhaust ports were on the inside of the V angle.

=== Results ===
The 2.5L version produced 285bhp, and was used on Repco Brabham BT23A for Jack Brabham in 1967 Tasman Series where Brabham tied for 2nd place in the season. This car was used by Phil West to win 1968 Bathurst Gold Star Trophy on 15 April 1968. RB740 was also used by Leo Geoghegan on Lotus 39 winning the Angus & Coote Diamond Trophy race at Oran Park on 19 May 1968, and the inaugural JAF Grand Prix in 1969.

The 3.0L version had 50/70/70/50° valve timing for 330 bhp @ 8,400rpm with a 12:1 compression ratio. This engine was used on Brabham BT24 in the 1967 Formula One season by Denny Hulme and Jack Brabham, making them the Formula One world champion and the runner-up, respectively. Brabham-Repco won the International Cup for F1 Manufacturers again. For the 1968 Formula One season, Hulme moved to McLaren, and Hulme's BT24 with RB740 was driven by Jochen Rindt for the first three Grands Prix. He scored 3rd in the season-opening South Africa.

== RB760 ==
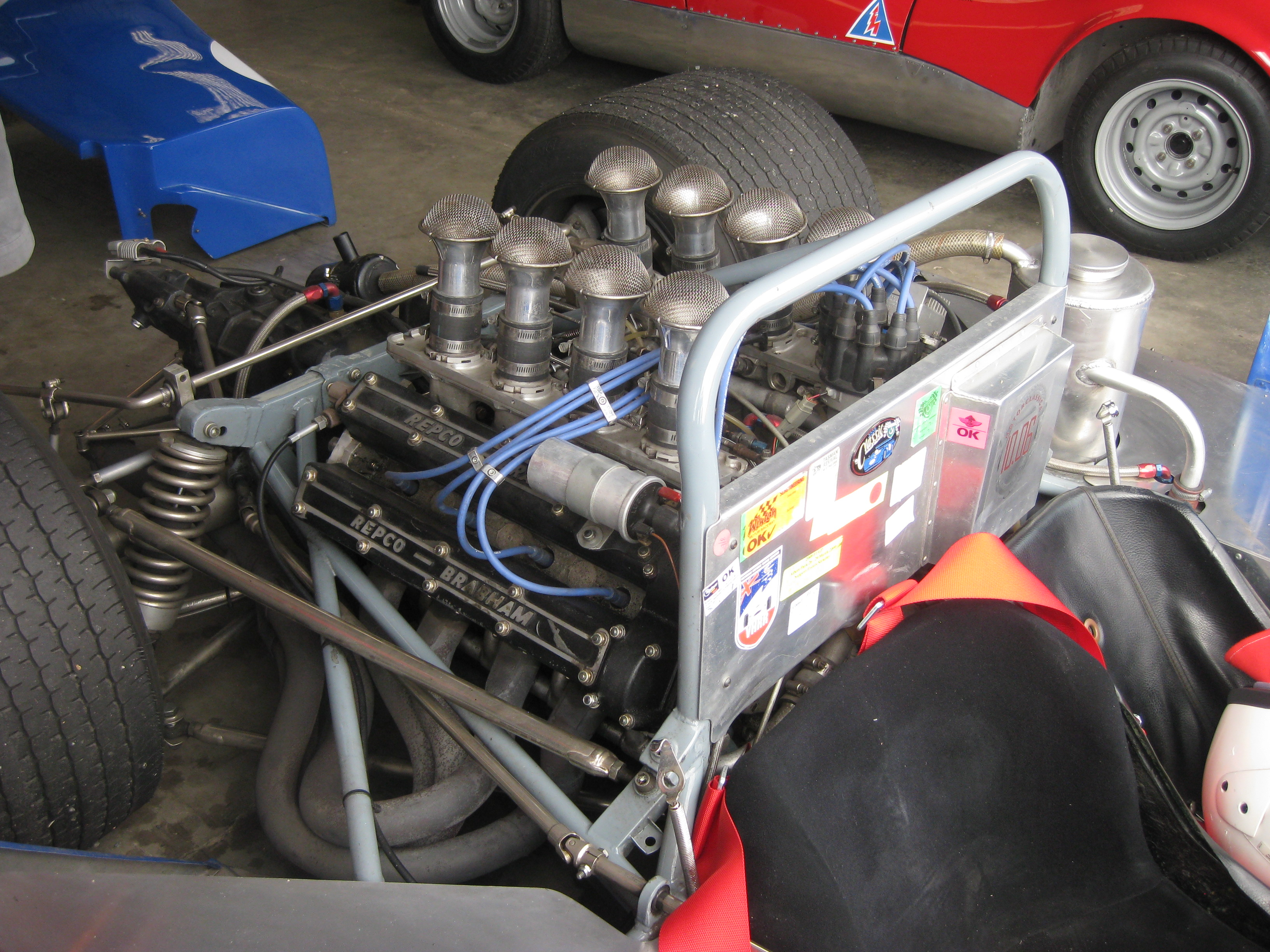
5.0L RB760 in Matich SR4

'60' series head (Note: Pictures of '60' series drive gears and installation showing the Lucas slide throttle unit.) had gear-driven double overhead camshaft, four valves per cylinder in a conventional placement of 2 intake valves on the inside, 2 exhaust valves outside of the V angle with siamesed intake and exhaust ports for each cylinder.

One engine was built in 2.8L displacement with the 2.5L crankshaft (55.0 mm stroke) in the bigger bore (90.0 mm) '700' series block and the '60' series four-valve DOHC cylinderhead for the 5.0L version. This engine was tested with a turbocharger to comply with the Indy 500 regulations, but with little success.

4.2L methanol version was used by Jochen Rindt and Masten Gregory on Brabham BT25 at 1968 Indianapolis 500. Rindt qualified 32nd and retired after lap 5 due to a broken piston. (Note: See a picture of the holed piston here.) Gregory did not qualify. In 1969 Indianapolis 500, the same two cars were used for Jack Brabham and Peter Revson. Brabham qualified 29th and retired after lap 58 due to ignition failure. Revson qualified last (33rd) and finished 5th.

5.0L version (460bhp@7500rpm) was used on Matich SR4 in 1969-70 winning the 1969 Australian Sports Car Championship; was used by Bob Jane on McLaren M6 for John Harvey in 1970-71, winning the 1971 Australian Sports Car Championship; and by Bob Britton on Rennmax Repco driven by Lionel Ayers, finishing second in the 1973 and 1974 Australian Sports Car Championships.

== RB830 ==
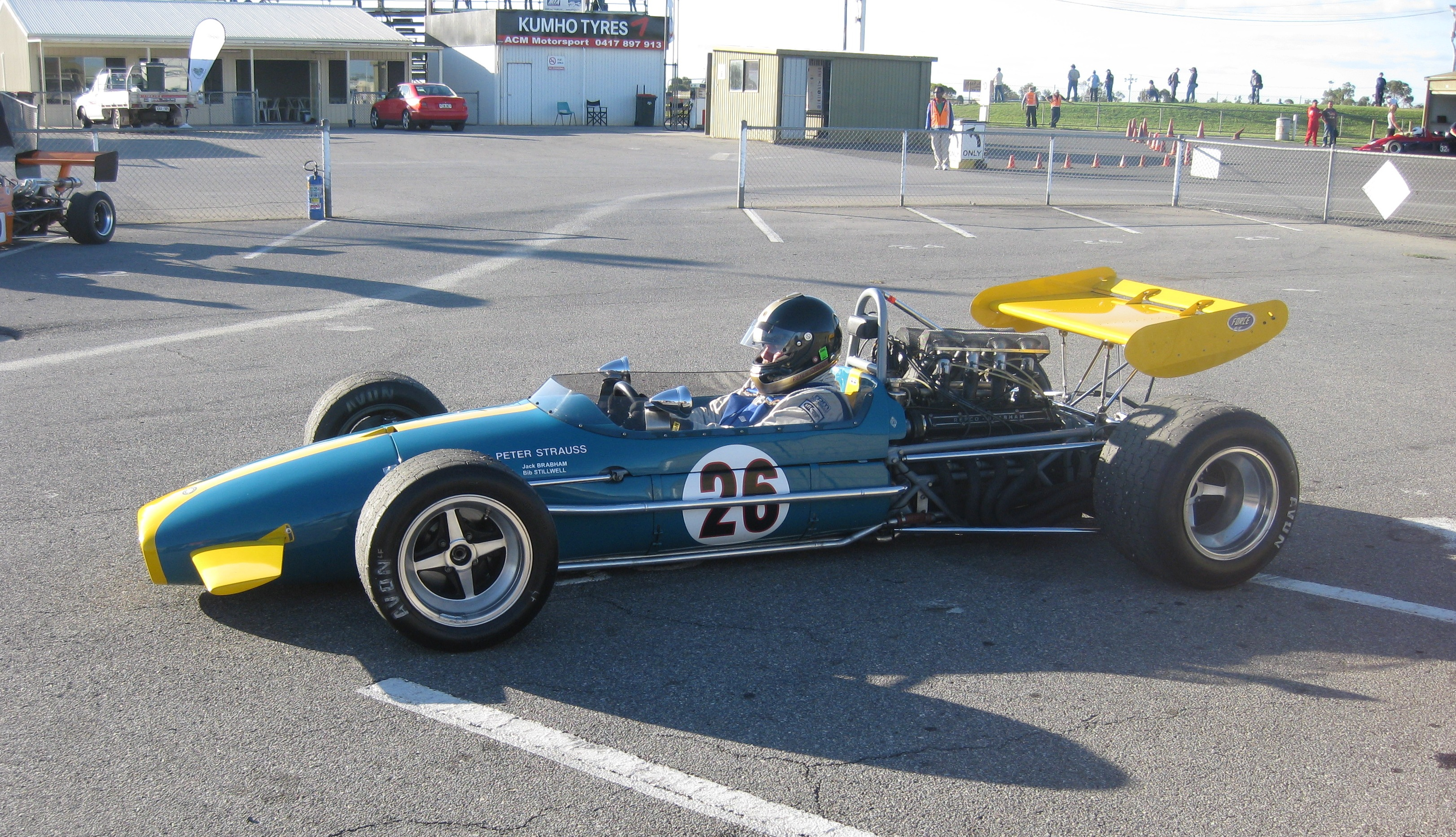
Brabham BT31 with 2.5L RB830

'800' series block was cast in magnesium alloy specifically for 2.5 and 3.0L displacements with a 1.25" shorter deck height (distance from the crankshaft centre to cylinderhead mating surface), which resulted in a smaller size and lighter weight of the block. A smaller number of counterweights on the crankshaft further lightened the engine. The oil sump incorporated one pressure and two scavenge pumps so that one scavenge pump was dedicated to the front oil drain port, and another to the rear port.

2.5L RB830 was raced by Jack Brabham on BT31 in the 1969 Tasman Series, finishing 3rd at Sandown International 100 on 9 February, and he won the Gold Star race at Bathurst on 7 April 1969.
The engine is also used by Garrie Cooper (Elfin 600D finished 3rd) and John Harvey (a Brabham BT23 copy built by Bob Jane, gained pole position, finished 6th) at 1970 Diamond Trophy Gold Sar race at Oran Park on 28 June 1970.

== RB850 ==
Wilson designed '50' series head with DOHC 4 valves with 'staggered' ports, one (small) exhaust and one (larger) intake ports under the inside camshaft of a cylinder facing inside, and another set of intake and exhaust ports of the same cylinder under the outside camshaft facing outside of the V angle. While this arrangement allowed a larger total valve circumference by the "small-large" valve pair placement on one side, and "large-small" pair placed on the other side (as opposed to the conventional "large-large" and "small-small" placement on each side), it resulted in 8 inlet ports and 8 exhaust pipes on the inside of the V, and 8 intake trumpets and 8 exhaust pipes on the outside.

This arrangement on 3.0L 'E30' showed promise on the dynamometer at 360 bhp @ 7,600rpm with twin plug ignition, and then at 365 bhp @ 9,200rpm on 13 January 1968. (Note: According to Rodway Wolfe.) However, integrating the myriad of pipes into the overall car design seemed inevitable to increase frontal area, and was rejected by Tauranac and Brabham, despite a mockup (Note: Pictures of this mockup are here and here.) was assembled and sent to MRD.

== RB860 ==
The gear-driven DOHC four-valve '60' series heads on the compact '800' block, RB860, was used during 1968. These engines had eight siamesed intake ports on the inside, and eight siamesed exhaust ports on the outside in a conventional arrangement.

3.0L version, with 5.100" centre-to-centre conrod length, was used on Brabham BT26 by Jack Brabham and Jochen Rindt in 1968, but was plagued with poor reliability. The BT26 became BT26A mid-season by Cosworth DFV replacing RB860.

== International Cup for F1 Manufacturers – results ==
- 1966 Brabham-Repco – 1st
- 1967 Brabham-Repco – 1st
- 1968 Brabham-Repco – 8th
- 1969 Brabham-Repco – NC

== World Championship of Drivers – results ==
Year	Team	Driver	# of GPs	Championship Standing
1966	Brabham-Repco	Jack Brabham	9	World Champion
1966	Brabham-Repco	Denny Hulme	7	4th
1967	Brabham-Repco	Denny Hulme	11	World Champion
1967	Brabham-Repco	Jack Brabham	11	2nd
1967	Brabham-Repco	Guy Ligier	5	
1968	Brabham-Repco	Jochen Rindt	12	12th
1968	Brabham-Repco	Jack Brabham	11	23rd
1968	Brabham-Repco	Silvio Moser	4	23rd
1968	Brabham-Repco	Dan Gurney	1	
1968	Brabham-Repco	Dave Charlton	1	
1968	Brabham-Repco	John Love	1	
1968	Brabham-Repco	Kurt Ahrens Jr.	1	
1968	LDS-Repco	Sam Tingle	1	
1969	Brabham-Repco	Peter de Klerk	1	
1969	Brabham-Repco	Sam Tingle	1	

== Complete Formula One World Championship results ==
(key) (results in bold indicate pole position) (results in italics indicate fastest lap)

Year	Entrant	Chassis	Engine	Tyre	Drivers	1	2	3	4	5	6	7	8	9	10	11	12	Points	WCC
1966	Brabham Racing Organisation	Brabham BT19; Brabham BT20	620 3.0 V8	G		MON	BEL	FRA	GBR	NED	GER	ITA	USA	MEX				42 (49)	1st
1966	Brabham Racing Organisation	Brabham BT19; Brabham BT20	620 3.0 V8	G	(Australia) Jack Brabham	Ret	4	1	**1**	**1**	1	Ret	**Ret**	2				42 (49)	1st
1966	Brabham Racing Organisation	Brabham BT19; Brabham BT20	620 3.0 V8	G	(New Zealand) Denny Hulme			3	2	Ret	Ret	3	Ret	3				42 (49)	1st
1967	Brabham Racing Organisation	Brabham BT19; Brabham BT20; Brabham BT24	620 3.0 V8; 740 3.0 V8	G		RSA	MON	NED	BEL	FRA	GBR	GER	CAN	ITA	USA	MEX		63 (67)	1st
1967	Brabham Racing Organisation	Brabham BT19; Brabham BT20; Brabham BT24	620 3.0 V8; 740 3.0 V8	G	(Australia) Jack Brabham	**6**	**Ret**	2	Ret	1	4	2	1	2	5	2		63 (67)	1st
1967	Brabham Racing Organisation	Brabham BT19; Brabham BT20; Brabham BT24	620 3.0 V8; 740 3.0 V8	G	(New Zealand) Denny Hulme	4	1	3	Ret	2	2	1	2	Ret	3	3		63 (67)	1st
1967	Guy Ligier	Brabham BT20	620 3.0 V8	F	(France) Guy Ligier						10	8		Ret	Ret	11		63 (67)	1st
1968	Brabham Racing Organisation	Brabham BT24; Brabham BT26	740 3.0 V8; 860 3.0 V8	G		RSA	ESP	MON	BEL	NED	FRA	GBR	GER	ITA	CAN	USA	MEX	10	8th
1968	Brabham Racing Organisation	Brabham BT24; Brabham BT26	740 3.0 V8; 860 3.0 V8	G	(Australia) Jack Brabham	Ret	DNS	Ret	Ret	Ret	Ret	Ret	5	Ret	Ret	Ret	10	10	8th
1968	Brabham Racing Organisation	Brabham BT24; Brabham BT26	740 3.0 V8; 860 3.0 V8	G	(Austria) Jochen Rindt	3	Ret	Ret	Ret	Ret	**Ret**	Ret	3	Ret	**Ret**	Ret	Ret	10	8th
1968	Brabham Racing Organisation	Brabham BT24; Brabham BT26	740 3.0 V8; 860 3.0 V8	G	(United States) Dan Gurney					Ret								10	8th
1968	Team Gunston	Brabham BT20	620 3.0 V8	F	(Rhodesia) John Love	9												10	8th
1968	Scuderia Scribante	Brabham BT11	620 3.0 V8	F	(South Africa) Dave Charlton	Ret												10	8th
1968	Charles Vögele Racing	Brabham BT20	620 3.0 V8	G	(Switzerland) Silvio Moser			DNQ		5		NC	DNS	DNQ				10	8th
1968	Caltex Racing Team	Brabham BT24	740 3.0 V8	D	(West Germany) Kurt Ahrens Jr.								12					10	8th
1968	Team Gunston	LDS Mk3	620 3.0 V8	F	(Rhodesia) Sam Tingle	Ret												0	NC
1969	Team Gunston	Brabham BT24	620 3.0 V8	F		RSA	ESP	MON	NED	FRA	GBR	GER	ITA	CAN	USA	MEX		0	NC
1969	Team Gunston	Brabham BT24	620 3.0 V8	F	(Rhodesia) Sam Tingle	8												0	NC
1969	Jack Holme	Brabham BT20	620 3.0 V8	G	(South Africa) Peter de Klerk	NC												0	NC

== See also ==
- List of Formula One engine manufacturers
