= 1966 Mexican Grand Prix =

Race details
- Date: October 23, 1966
- Official name: V Gran Premio de Mexico
- Location: Ciudad Deportiva Magdalena Mixhuca, Mexico City, Mexico
- Course: Permanent racing facility
- Course length: 5.000 km (3.107 miles)
- Distance: 65 laps, 325.000 km (201.946 miles)
- Weather: Warm, clear

Pole position
Driver	(United Kingdom) John Surtees	Cooper-Maserati
- Time: 1:53.18

Fastest lap
Driver	(United States) Richie Ginther	Honda
- Time: 1:53.75

Podium
First	(United Kingdom) John Surtees	Cooper-Maserati
Second	(Australia) Jack Brabham	Brabham-Repco
Third	(New Zealand) Denny Hulme	Brabham-Repco

The 1966 Mexican Grand Prix was a Formula One motor race held at the Ciudad Deportiva Magdalena Mixhuca on 23 October 1966. It was race 9 of 9 in both the 1966 World Championship of Drivers and the 1966 International Cup for Formula One Manufacturers. The race was the fifth Mexican Grand Prix and the first to be run under the new three-litre Formula. It was held over 65 laps of the 5 km (3.1 mi) circuit for a race distance of 325 km (202 mi).

The race was won by British driver John Surtees driving a Cooper T81-Maserati, his first victory since leaving Scuderia Ferrari to join Cooper. Surtees led home reigning world champion Australian owner-driver Jack Brabham, driving a Brabham BT20-Repco, by eight seconds. A lap down in third place, also driving a Brabham BT20, was Brabham's teammate New Zealander Denny Hulme.

Surtees's victory promoted him to second place in the championship, vaulting past Austrian driver Jochen Rindt of the Cooper works team.

== Race report ==
John Surtees dominated to take his first win since transferring from Ferrari to Cooper in mid season. He took the lead from Jack Brabham on lap 6 and was never challenged. With Jim Clark suffering gearbox problems and both BRMs retiring, Richie Ginther was the only contender left. However he too had mechanical problems, and dropped back. Brabham rallied at the end to close, but Surtees had lapped the entire field up to second. The first year of 3-litre engines had resulted in wins for five different makes of car, using five different engines.

== Classification ==
=== Qualifying ===
Pos	No	Driver	Constructor	Time	Gap
1	7	(United Kingdom) John Surtees	Cooper-Maserati	1:53.18	—
2	1	(United Kingdom) Jim Clark	Lotus-BRM	1:53.50	+0.32
3	12	(United States) Richie Ginther	Honda	1:53.56	+0.38
4	5	(Australia) Jack Brabham	Brabham-Repco	1:53.95	+0.77
5	8	(Austria) Jochen Rindt	Cooper-Maserati	1:54.19	+1.01
6	6	(New Zealand) Denny Hulme	Brabham-Repco	1:54.21	+1.03
7	3	(United Kingdom) Graham Hill	BRM	1:54.61	+1.43
8	11	(Mexico) Pedro Rodríguez	Lotus-Climax	1:54.78	+1.60
9	15	(United States) Dan Gurney	Eagle-Climax	1:54.93	+1.75
10	4	(United Kingdom) Jackie Stewart	BRM	1:55.90	+2.72
11	18	(United Kingdom) Mike Spence	Lotus-BRM	1:55.98	+2.80
12	19	(Switzerland) Jo Siffert	Cooper-Maserati	1:55.99	+2.81
13	22	(Sweden) Jo Bonnier	Cooper-Maserati	1:56.49	+3.31
14	14	(United States) Ronnie Bucknum	Honda	1:56.59	+3.41
15	17	(New Zealand) Bruce McLaren	McLaren-Ford	1:56.84	+3.66
16	9	(Mexico) Moisés Solana	Cooper-Maserati	1:57.44	+4.26
17	10	(United Kingdom) Innes Ireland	BRM	1:57.46	+4.28
18	2	(United Kingdom) Peter Arundell	Lotus-BRM	2:00.79	+7.61
19	16	(United States) Bob Bondurant	Eagle-Weslake	2:02.88	+9.70

=== Race ===
Pos	No	Driver	Constructor	Laps	Time/Retired	Grid	Points
1	7	(United Kingdom) John Surtees	Cooper-Maserati	65	2:06:35.34	1	9
2	5	(Australia) Jack Brabham	Brabham-Repco	65	+ 7.88	4	6
3	6	(New Zealand) Denny Hulme	Brabham-Repco	64	+ 1 lap	6	4
4	12	(United States) Richie Ginther	Honda	64	+ 1 lap	3	3
5	15	(United States) Dan Gurney	Eagle-Climax	64	+ 1 lap	9	2
6	22	(Sweden) Jo Bonnier	Cooper-Maserati	63	+ 2 laps	12	1
7	2	(United Kingdom) Peter Arundell	Lotus-BRM	61	+ 4 laps	17	
8	14	(United States) Ronnie Bucknum	Honda	60	+ 5 laps	13	
Ret	11	(Mexico) Pedro Rodríguez	Lotus-Climax	49	Differential	8	
Ret	17	(New Zealand) Bruce McLaren	McLaren-Ford	40	Engine	14	
Ret	19	(Switzerland) Jo Siffert	Cooper-Maserati	33	Suspension	11	
Ret	8	(Austria) Jochen Rindt	Cooper-Maserati	32	Suspension	5	
Ret	10	(United Kingdom) Innes Ireland	BRM	28	Transmission	16	
Ret	4	(United Kingdom) Jackie Stewart	BRM	26	Oil Leak	10	
Ret	16	(United States) Bob Bondurant	Eagle-Weslake	24	Fuel System	18	
Ret	3	(United Kingdom) Graham Hill	BRM	18	Engine	7	
Ret	1	(United Kingdom) Jim Clark	Lotus-BRM	9	Gearbox	2	
Ret	9	(Mexico) Moisés Solana	Cooper-Maserati	9	Overheating	15	
DNS	18	(United Kingdom) Mike Spence	Lotus-BRM	0	Accident		

== Notes ==
- This was the 10th win for a Maserati-powered car.

== Final Championship standings ==
- **Bold text** indicates the World Champions.

Drivers' Championship standings

	Pos	Driver	Points
	1	(Australia) **Jack Brabham**	42 (45)
1	2	(United Kingdom) John Surtees	28
1	3	(Austria) Jochen Rindt	22 (24)
3	4	(New Zealand) Denny Hulme	18
1	5	(United Kingdom) Graham Hill	17

Constructors' Championship standings

Pos	Constructor	Points
1	(United Kingdom) **Brabham-Repco**	42 (49)
2	(Italy) Ferrari	31 (32)
3	(United Kingdom) Cooper-Maserati	30 (35)
4	(United Kingdom) BRM	22
5	(United Kingdom) Lotus-BRM	13

- Notes: Only the top five positions are included for both sets of standings. Only the best 5 results counted towards the Championship. Numbers without parentheses are Championship points; numbers in parentheses are total points scored.

Previous race: 1966 United States Grand Prix	FIA Formula One World Championship; 1966 season	Next race: 1967 South African Grand Prix
Previous race: 1965 Mexican Grand Prix	Mexican Grand Prix	Next race: 1967 Mexican Grand Prix
