= 1969 South African Grand Prix =

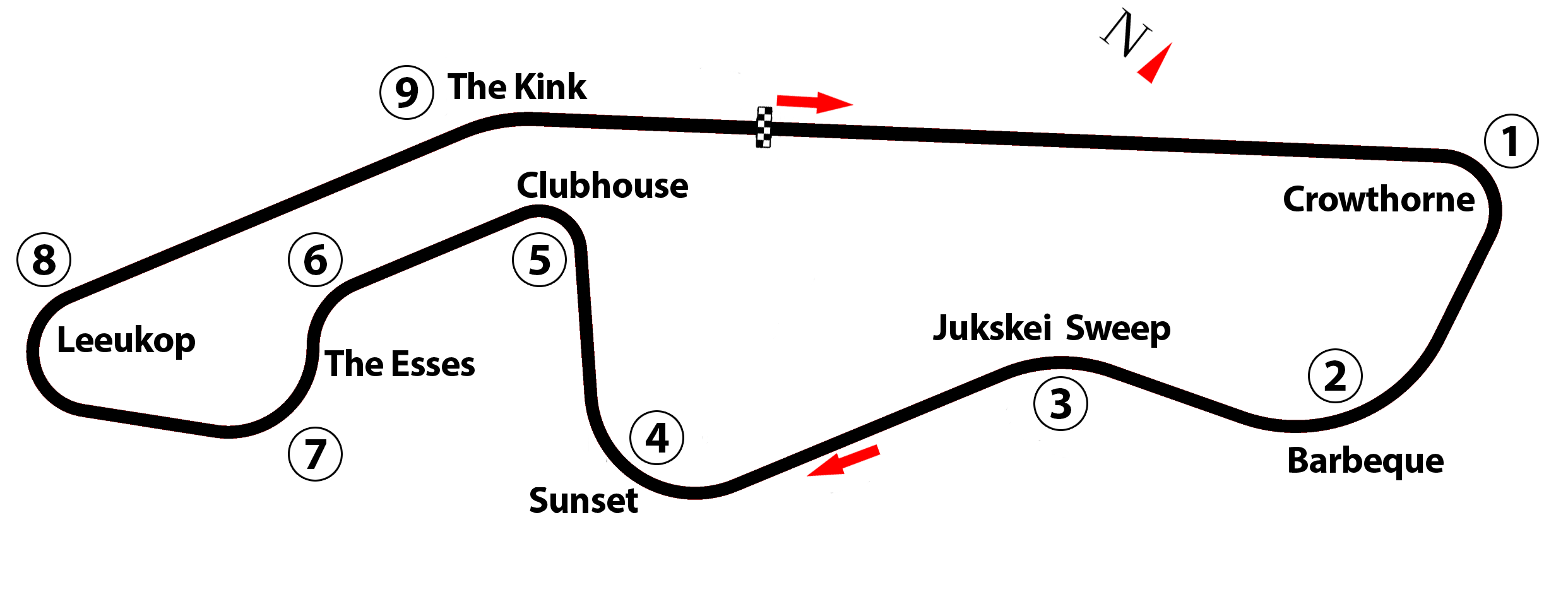
- The Kyalami Circuit (1967–1985)

Race details
- Date: 1 March 1969
- Official name: Third AA Grand Prix of South Africa
- Location: Kyalami, Midrand, Transvaal Province, South Africa
- Course: Permanent racing facility
- Course length: 4.104 km (2.550 miles)
- Distance: 80 laps, 328.320 km (204.009 miles)
- Weather: Hot, Dry

Pole position
Driver	(Australia) Jack Brabham	Brabham-Ford
- Time: 1:20.0

Fastest lap
Driver	(United Kingdom) Jackie Stewart	Matra-Ford
- Time: 1:21.6 on lap 50

Podium
First	(United Kingdom) Jackie Stewart	Matra-Ford
Second	(United Kingdom) Graham Hill	Lotus-Ford
Third	(New Zealand) Denny Hulme	McLaren-Ford

The 1969 South African Grand Prix, formally the Third AA Grand Prix of South Africa (Afrikaans: Derde AA Suid-Afrikaanse Grand Prix), was a Formula One motor race held at Kyalami Circuit on 1 March 1969. It was race 1 of 11 in both the 1969 World Championship of Drivers and the 1969 International Cup for Formula One Manufacturers. The 80-lap race was won by Matra driver Jackie Stewart after he started from fourth position. Graham Hill finished second for the Lotus team and McLaren driver Denny Hulme came in third.

== Background ==
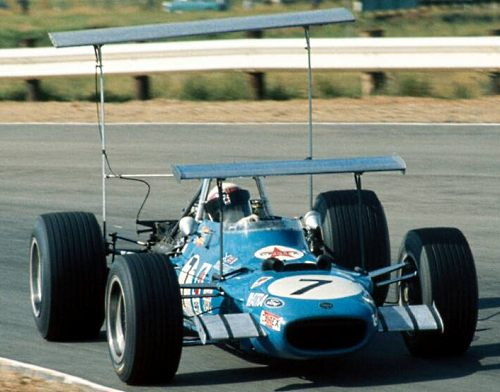
Jackie Stewart in his Matra MS10

In the weeks leading up to the first Formula One race of the 1969 season, entries were being announced for the race, with all the teams, apart from Ferrari expected to nominate two drivers for the race. Enzo Ferrari, the managing director of the team he founded, announced that Ferrari were only going to nominate one driver for the race. To most people's surprise, Ferrari at first nominated two drivers for the race without explanation. However, the decision was later changed, with only Chris Amon nominated eventually for Ferrari. Brabham, BRM, Lotus, Matra and McLaren all chose to nominate two drivers for the race meeting.

== Classification ==
=== Qualifying ===
Pos	No	Driver	Constructor	Time	Gap
1	14	(Australia) Jack Brabham	Brabham-Ford	1:20.0	—
2	2	(Austria) Jochen Rindt	Lotus-Ford	1:20.2	+0.2
3	5	(New Zealand) Denny Hulme	McLaren-Ford	1:20.3	+0.3
4	7	(United Kingdom) Jackie Stewart	Matra-Ford	1:20.4	+0.4
5	9	(New Zealand) Chris Amon	Ferrari	1:20.5	+0.5
6	3	(United States) Mario Andretti	Lotus-Ford	1:20.8	+0.8
7	1	(United Kingdom) Graham Hill	Lotus-Ford	1:21.1	+1.1
8	6	(New Zealand) Bruce McLaren	McLaren-Ford	1:21.1	+1.1
9	18	(South Africa) Basil van Rooyen	McLaren-Ford	1:21.8	+1.8
10	16	(Rhodesia) John Love	Lotus-Ford	1:22.1	+2.1
11	8	(France) Jean-Pierre Beltoise	Matra-Ford	1:22.2	+2.2
12	4	(Switzerland) Jo Siffert	Lotus-Ford	1:22.2	+2.2
13	15	(Belgium) Jacky Ickx	Brabham-Ford	1:23.1	+3.1
14	11	(United Kingdom) Jackie Oliver	BRM	1:24.1	+4.1
15	12	(Mexico) Pedro Rodríguez	BRM	1:25.2	+5.2
16	19	(South Africa) Peter de Klerk	Brabham-Repco	1:27.2	+7.2
17	17	(Rhodesia) Sam Tingle	Brabham-Repco	1:50.4	+30.4
EX	10	(United Kingdom) John Surtees	BRM	1:21.8	+1.8

- Surtees's qualifying time was excluded as he had started at the back of the grid.

=== Race ===
Pos	No	Driver	Constructor	Laps	Time/Retired	Grid	Points
1	7	(United Kingdom) Jackie Stewart	Matra-Ford	80	1:50:39.1	4	9
2	1	(United Kingdom) Graham Hill	Lotus-Ford	80	+ 18.8	7	6
3	5	(New Zealand) Denny Hulme	McLaren-Ford	80	+ 31.8	3	4
4	4	(Switzerland) Jo Siffert	Lotus-Ford	80	+ 49.2	12	3
5	6	(New Zealand) Bruce McLaren	McLaren-Ford	79	+ 1 Lap	8	2
6	8	(France) Jean-Pierre Beltoise	Matra-Ford	78	+ 2 Laps	11	1
7	11	(United Kingdom) Jackie Oliver	BRM	77	+ 3 Laps	14	
8	17	(Rhodesia) Sam Tingle	Brabham-Repco	73	+ 7 Laps	17	
NC	19	(South Africa) Peter de Klerk	Brabham-Repco	67	+ 13 Laps	16	
Ret	2	(Austria) Jochen Rindt	Lotus-Ford	44	Fuel Pump	2	
Ret	10	(United Kingdom) John Surtees	BRM	40	Engine	18	
Ret	12	(Mexico) Pedro Rodríguez	BRM	38	Water Leak	15	
Ret	9	(New Zealand) Chris Amon	Ferrari	34	Engine	5	
Ret	14	(Australia) Jack Brabham	Brabham-Ford	32	Handling	1	
Ret	3	(United States) Mario Andretti	Lotus-Ford	31	Gearbox	6	
Ret	16	(Rhodesia) John Love	Lotus-Ford	31	Ignition	10	
Ret	15	(Belgium) Jacky Ickx	Brabham-Ford	20	Ignition	13	
Ret	18	(South Africa) Basil van Rooyen	McLaren-Ford	12	Brakes	9	

== Notes ==
- This was the 100th race for BRM as an engine supplier. In those 100 races, they had won 14 Grands Prix, achieved 56 podiums, 9 pole positions, 12 fastest laps, 2 Grand Slams, and had won 1 Driver's and 1 Constructor's World Championship.

== Championship standings after the race ==
Drivers' Championship standings

Pos	Driver	Points
1	(United Kingdom) Jackie Stewart	9
2	(United Kingdom) Graham Hill	6
3	(New Zealand) Denny Hulme	4
4	(Switzerland) Jo Siffert	3
5	(New Zealand) Bruce McLaren	2

Constructors' Championship standings

Pos	Constructor	Points
1	(France) Matra-Ford	9
2	(United Kingdom) Lotus-Ford	6
3	(United Kingdom) McLaren-Ford	4

- Note: Only the top five positions are included for both sets of standings.

Previous race: 1968 Mexican Grand Prix	FIA Formula One World Championship; 1969 season	Next race: 1969 Spanish Grand Prix
Previous race: 1968 South African Grand Prix	South African Grand Prix	Next race: 1970 South African Grand Prix
