= Ron Tauranac =

British-Australian engineer (1925–2020)

Ron Tauranac AO
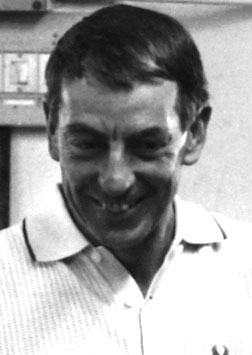
- Ron Tauranac at the 1971 Monaco Grand Prix
- Born: 13 January 1925; Gillingham, Kent, England
- Died: 17 July 2020 (aged 95); Sunshine Coast, Queensland, Australia
- Citizenship: Australian
- Occupation: Racing car designer
- Known for: Co-founder of Brabham
- Website: rontauranac.co.uk

Ronald Sidney Tauranac AO (13 January 1925 – 17 July 2020) was a British-Australian engineer and racing car designer, who with Formula One driver Jack Brabham founded the Brabham constructor and racing team in 1962. Following Brabham's retirement as a driver at the end of the 1970 season, Tauranac owned and managed the Brabham team until 1972, when he sold it to Bernie Ecclestone. He remained in England to assist with a redesign of a Politoys Formula One chassis for Frank Williams in 1973 and helped Trojan develop a Formula One version of their Formula 5000 car.

After a brief retirement in Australia, Tauranac returned to England to establish the Ralt marque (a name he and his brother Austin had used for some 'specials' in Australia in the 1950s, winning the NSW Hillclimb Championship in 1954 with the Ralt 500). The first "modern" Ralt was the Ralt RT1 chassis, to be raced in Formula Three, Formula Two and Formula Atlantic. The chassis proved successful, winning the European Formula Three championship in 1975 in the hands of Australian driver Larry Perkins. The 1978 season also proved successful for the RT1 chassis, winning the European F3 championship for Jan Lammers.

Tauranac designed the Theodore Racing F1 car for the 1978 season. Two new designs were created for the 1979 season: the RT2 for Formula Two and the RT3 for Formula Three. The RT3 chassis won the 1983 European F3 championship for Pierluigi Martini and five consecutive British F3 titles. A joint venture with Honda resulted in the RH6 chassis, which won the 1981, 1984 and 1985 titles. In October 1988, Tauranac sold the Ralt business to March Engineering for £1.25 million.

Tauranac remained involved with various aspects of the sport since departing from Ralt, including racing-school cars for Honda, a Formula Renault car, consulting work for the Arrows Formula One team, and continued relationships with Honda. Tauranac was the design judge at the Formula SAE Australasia competition in Melbourne, Australia.

In the 2002 Australia Day Honours, Tauranac was appointed Officer of the Order of Australia for "service to motor racing, particularly through the engineering design, construction and production of Formula 1 racing cars, providing young drivers with opportunities to compete at top levels, and sharing knowledge with others for the advancement of the sport".

Tauranac died on 17 July 2020, aged 95.
