= Sporting nationality =

Term in international sport

Nationality in sporting events describes the affiliation of a participant in an international sporting event with one or more nations, typically as a member or potential member of a national team. The participant's sporting nationality is often the same as their citizenship at birth, but many sports have rules that allow participants to change nationalities, add a nationality, or represent a country to which they have limited ties through birth or ancestry.

A participant in a sporting event may have a sporting nationality without necessarily being a member of a national team.

== Athletics ==
In athletics, World Athletics eligibility rules define which member nation or nations an athlete may represent. Eligibility to represent a nation typically derives from legal citizenship, attained either through birth of the participant or a recent ancestor, or through residence, marriage, or other means. World Athletics also maintains eligibility rules related to new countries, countries that no longer exist, or countries that change their affiliation with the organization, and reviews requests for transfers of allegiance made by athletes. There is typically a multi-year waiting period for athletes who request a transfer of allegiance.

== Association football ==
In association football, FIFA maintains eligibility rules for participants in international competitions. In 2004, FIFA amended its wider policy on international eligibility, ruling that players must be able to demonstrate a "clear connection" to a country that they had not been born in but wished to represent. This ruling explicitly stated that, in such scenarios, the player must have at least one parent or grandparent who was born in that country, or the player must have been resident in that country for at least two years. The residency requirement for players lacking birth or ancestral connections with a specific country was extended from two to five years in 2008.

== Equestrian ==
The Fédération Équestre Internationale regulates sport nationality for equestrians.

== Figure skating ==
The International Skating Union allows skaters in pair and ice dancing to represent a country even if only one member has the associated citizenship. However, International Olympic Committee–sanctioned tournaments like the Winter Olympics require both people to possess the appropriate citizenship.

== Motorsport ==
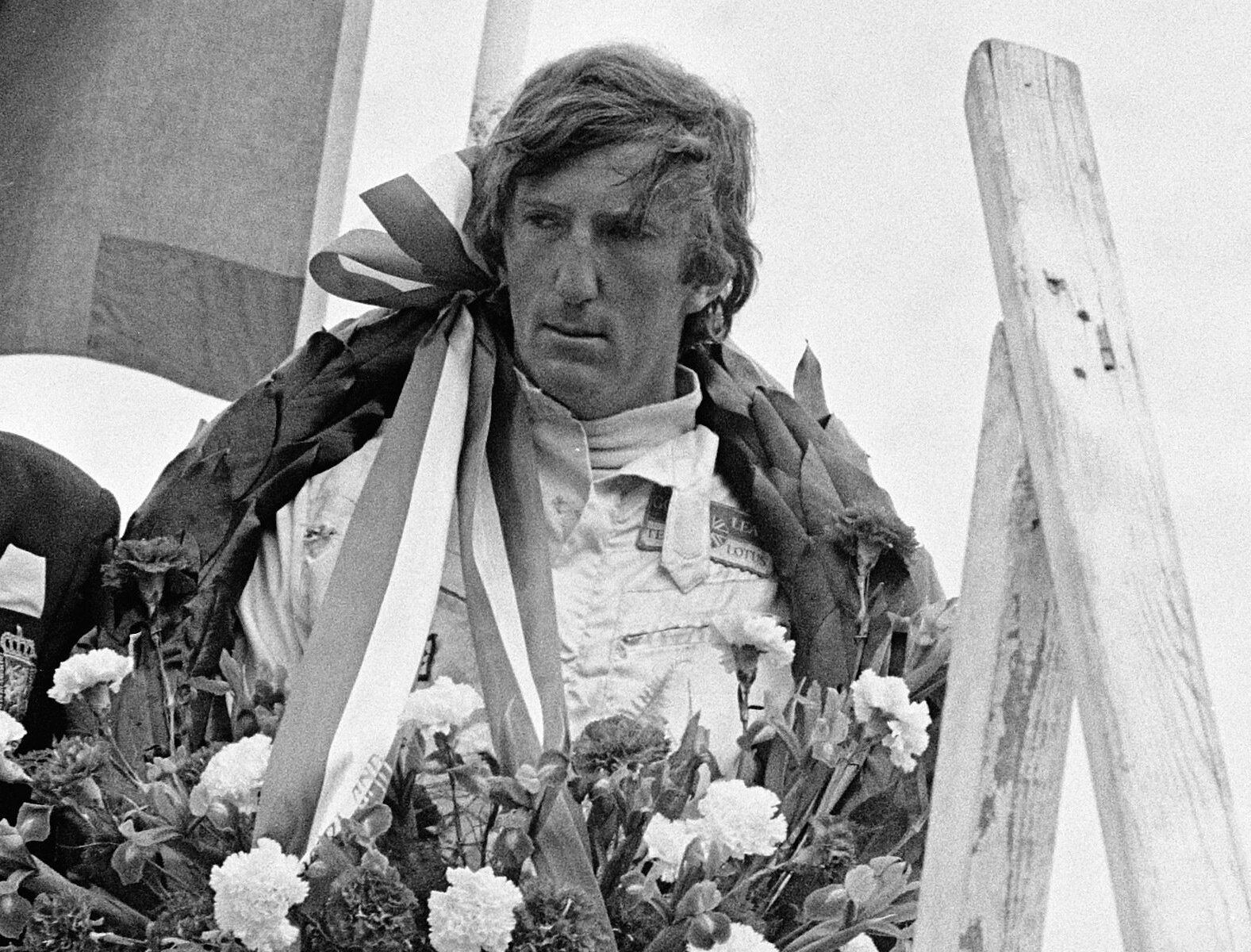
Jochen Rindt, a German-born driver who competed under the Austrian flag in Formula One

Nationality in motorsport is determined by the Fédération Internationale de l'Automobile (FIA). In all FIA World Championships, including the FIA Super Licence required for Formula One, the nationality that appears alongside a driver's name corresponds to their passport. Drivers with multiple citizenship, such as Dutch and Belgian driver Max Verstappen, choose their "official" nationality. Unlike other series overseen by the FIA, this is not necessarily the same as the National Sporting Authority (ASN) issuing the driver's racing licence. Various ASNs have regulations dictating membership eligibility; those without a citizenship requirement may allow foreign drivers to register. Formula One had also previously allowed this practice, a notable example being Jochen Rindt—a German-born driver who competed with an Austrian licence and thus represented them, despite not holding Austrian citizenship. Drivers may also compete neutrally, similar to the Authorised Neutral Athletes (ANA) system in the Olympics, if their country is not represented by the FIA; this was required of all Russian and Belarusian drivers, who did not hold an alternative licence, following the Russian invasion of Ukraine.

== Olympic Games ==
Participants in the Olympic Games must be a national of the country (formally, the National Olympic Committee) that they are representing at the Games. Like World Athletics, the International Olympic Committee's charter contains provisions for participants to change allegiances, and rules related to changes in the national status of states and territories.

== Rugby ==
In addition to rules related to birth and biological ancestry, World Rugby, the governing body for rugby union, specifies that if a player, or the player's biological parent, has been legally adopted under the laws of the relevant country, descent is traced through the adoptive parent(s).

== Volleyball ==
In volleyball, the sporting nationality is related to the "federation of origin" or the first national volleyball association to register the player. In order for a player to play for a national team, their federation of origin must match the national team they intend to play for. To change one's federation of origin they must possess or acquire the associated citizenship of the new federation. Since 2024, a player who has played for a senior national team cannot change their federation of origin regardless of citizenship status.

== Change of nationality ==
Change of nationality by participants in international sporting events has been the subject of academic study.

Changing nationalities can often be done by obtaining citizenship in the new country, waiting a specified period, and gaining approval from the relevant national federation or other governing body for a sport.

Sporting nationality changes can be motivated by various factors such as athletes moving to another country, seeking better training environments, or an alternative route to qualify for high-level tournaments like the Olympics if national qualification in their original country is too competitive.

== See also ==
- Quota players
