= Krieglach forced labour camp =

WWII prisoner of war camp in Austria

Coordinates: 47.548817°N 15.547017°E

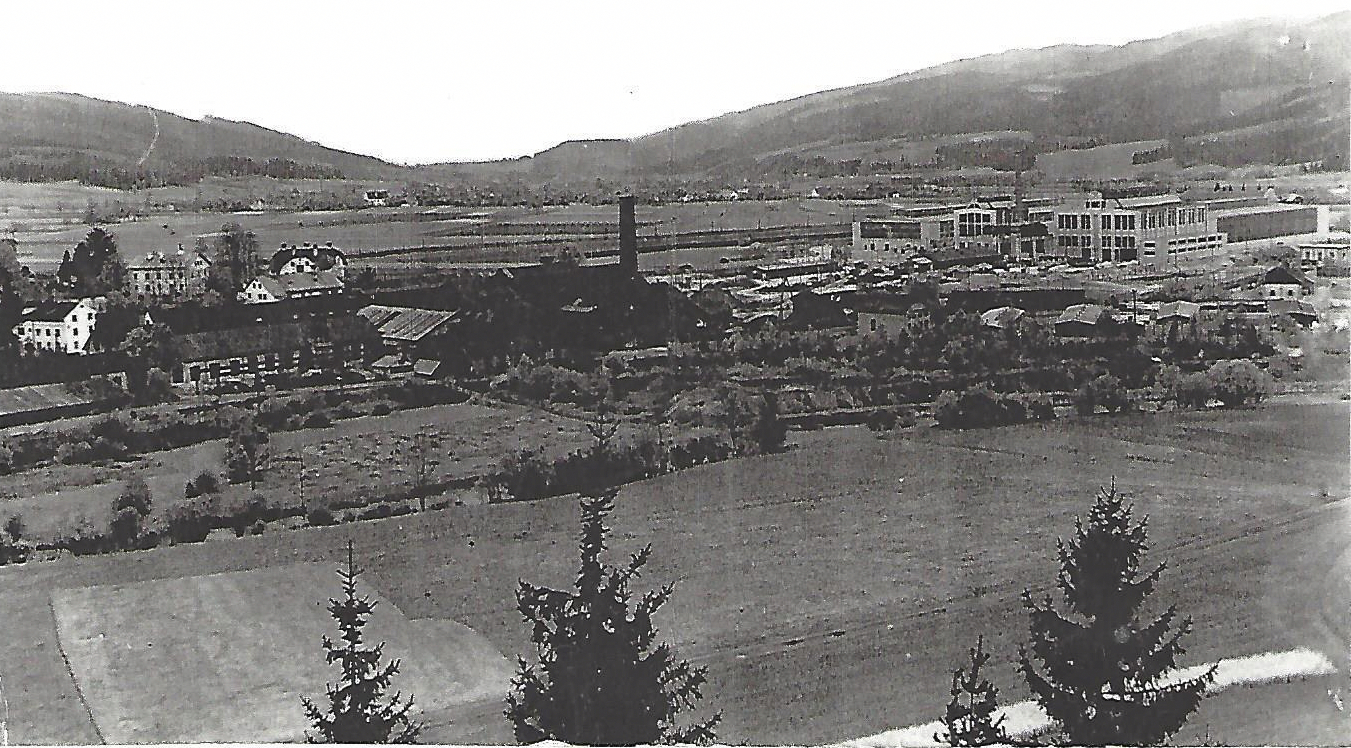
1943 Northeast view of the camp and drop forging plant.

The Krieglach forced labour camp was a Nazi prisoner of war forced labour camp in Krieglach, Austria.

== History ==
It was built in 1939/40 to house workers for the armaments factory "Eisenwerke AG Krieglach", part of "Reichswerke AG Hermann Göring", in wooden barracks. The plant operated until the German operators of the plant fled Krieglach to the west on May 7/8 1945, trying to cover their tracks in the last days of the Second World War by destroying all archives of the plant. The camp was liberated by allied troops on May 8, 1945. Today no traces of the camp's existence can be found in the area. A militarily organized security force was responsible for guarding the plant and the surrounding area. The camp had very strict rules of conduct with corporal punishment and temporary incarceration in a labor education camp being used as punishment in the event of rule violations. Prisoner documents were issued for the prisoners' stay at the Krieglach area.

The camp inmates were fed from a central kitchen, with the main foodstuffs being potatoes and beets.

== Prisoners ==
The camp housed Belgian and French prisoners of war from 1940, Soviets from 1941, Italians from 1943 and Greeks from 1944. The main areas of work for prisoners were the factory halls, the factory railroad, auxiliary work in the drop forge operation and the construction of air protection tunnels. The factory manufactured parts for the "Königstiger" and "Jagdtiger" tanks.

Many Greek prisoners were from the Peloponnese and had been captured in June 1944, four months before the German withdrawal from Greece in October 1944, in a large-scale operation to capture teenage and adult men for use in labour camps, while also influencing their families not to take part in the Greek Resistance. An example route via which prisoners were transported to the camp is Paralio Astros – Nafplion – Corinth – Haidari – Bulgaria – Serbia – Hungary – Vienna – Graz – Krieglach.

The names of 118 Peloponnesian prisoners, some of whom died, are recorded. There are surviving written journals documenting prisoners' experiences during their transport to and imprisonment at the camp and their return after the German defeat.
