= Peter Rosegger =

Austrian writer and poet

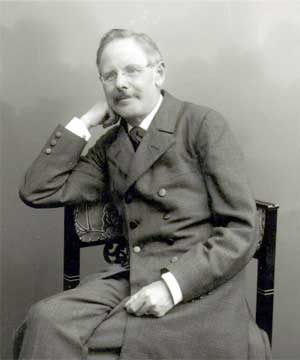
- Peter Rosegger (c. 1900)
- Born: 31 July 1843; Alpl, Austria
- Died: 26 June 1918 (aged 74)
- Education: Akademie für Handel und Industrie
- Writing career
- Notable work: Geschichten aus der Steiermark

Peter Rosegger (original Roßegger) (31 July 1843 – 26 June 1918) was an Austrian writer and poet from Krieglach in the province of Styria. He was a son of a mountain farmer and grew up in the woodlands and mountains of Alpl. Rosegger (or Rossegger) went on to become a prolific poet and author as well as an insightful teacher and visionary.

In his later years, he was honoured by officials from various Austrian universities and the city of Graz (the capital of Styria). He was nominated for the Nobel Prize in Literature three times. He was nearly awarded the Nobel Prize in 1913 and is (at least among the people of Styria) something like a national treasure to this day.

== Early life ==
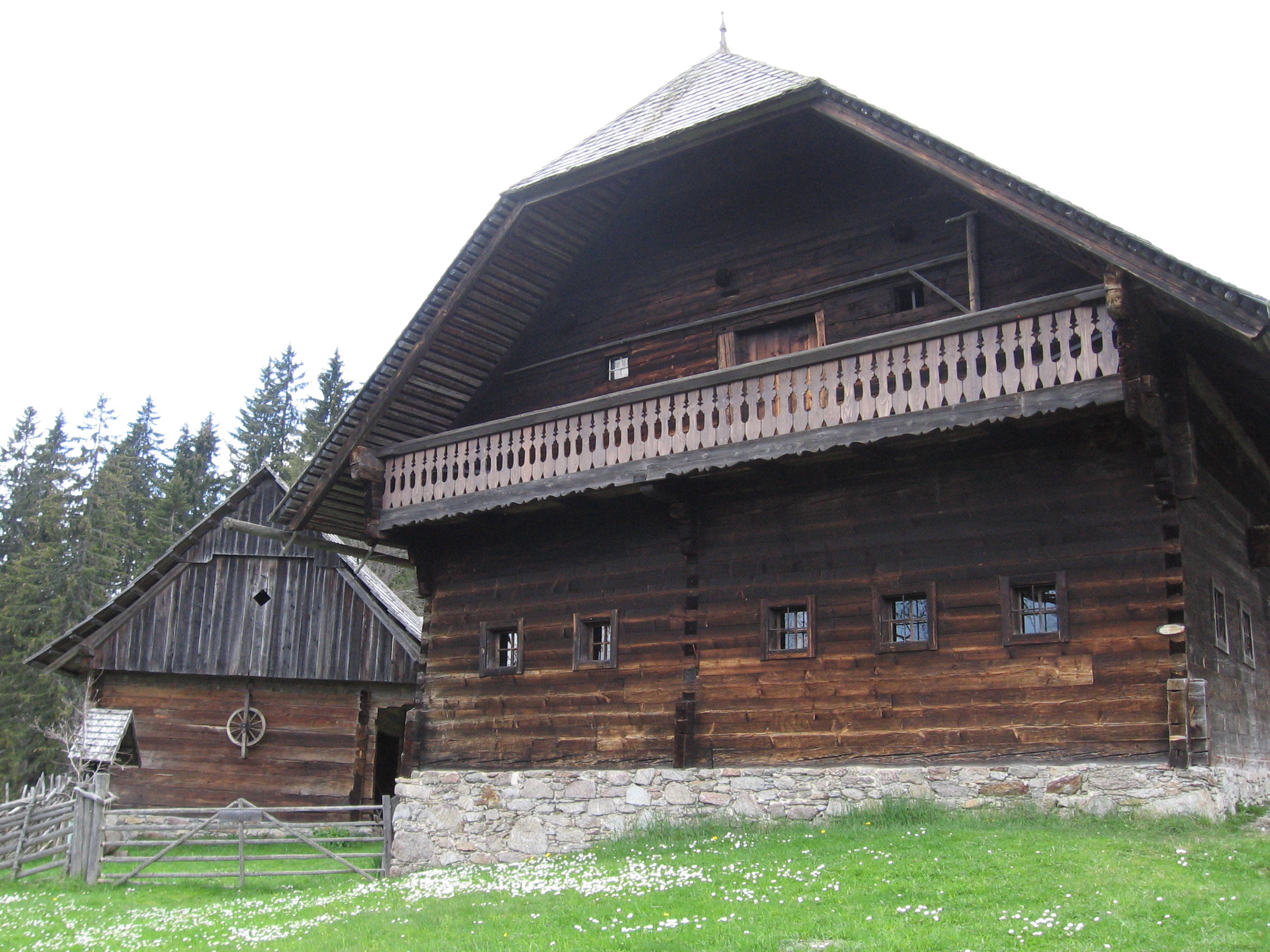
Rosegger's preserved birthplace (2008)

Rosegger was born as the first of seven children of a peasant couple in the village of Alpl, in the mountains above Krieglach, Styria. The family lived in a simple 18th-century Alpine farmhouse, called Kluppeneggerhof. Living conditions were modest, the central room was used for eating, sleeping and working. Food was prepared over a hearth in the scullery. The farmhouse is now part of the Universalmuseum Joanneum, but even today the building ensemble can only be reached by foot.

Since this little village, consisting only of a handful of farms, had neither a church nor a school, Rosegger and the other children would have had to walk down the mountain to the larger village, St. Kathrein, in order to attend either. The way there takes two hours and as a result, Peter had very limited education, largely provided by a wandering teacher who taught him and other children from the region for a year and a half. His physical constitution was not sufficient for him to become a farmer like his father, as he was often sick and rather frail in general. So, he became understudy of a traveling tailor at the age of seventeen.

== Success as a writer ==
His interest in literature prevailed, although he earned little money. He spent what he could afford on books and soon began to write himself. Eventually, he was discovered by the publisher of the Graz-based newspaper, Tagespost, published by Dr. Svoboda. He realized Rosegger's talent as an author and enabled him to attend the Akademie für Handel und Industrie (Academy for Trade and Industries) in Graz.

There, Peter von Reininghaus became his mentor. Von Reininghaus was a wealthy and influential industrialist, and Rosegger had a personal friendship with him for the rest of his life. However, he had a hard time studying, as he was not used to attending school regularly, and had little, and fragmentary, knowledge in many disciplines. He left the academy in 1869 at the age of twenty-six.

Soon after that, he was offered a chance to publish his literary works, namely by Gustav Heckenast, who had worked with Adalbert Stifter before. Peter Rosegger accepted, and his first book, Geschichten aus der Steiermark ("Tales from Styria"), was released in 1871.

Rosegger changed to a new publisher twice after Heckenast's death, eventually ending up with Ludwig Staackmann, who made him a most generous offer. He had always been very faithful towards his publishers, and the relationship between them was one of friendship and familiarity. Rosegger started to publish Heimgarten in 1876, a monthly journal with articles and stories for the people of the country, whose main representative and interpreter he was.

== Character and private life ==
In 1873, Rosegger married Anna Pichler. They had two children, but the marriage was short - Anna died giving birth in 1875. This affected Peter to a great degree, as is obvious from various letters he wrote to friends in that time. In 1879, Rosegger married again: Anna Knaur, with whom he had three more children and a very harmonious house life. She also cared for him during his many times of sickness.

He developed many brilliant and extraordinary ideas from the context of his time, and kept contact with unconventional personalities. Rudolf Falb, the creator of the popular "lunisolar flood theory," was not only his school teacher but remained a lifelong friend. Although feeling strongly connected to his rural homelands, he was a liberal thinker with conservative roots. Fascinated by machines and technology, and being a faithful Christian, he showed a sharp eye for the potentials and advantages, as well as for the dangers and downsides of both the church and the economic development of the late 19th century. As an author he aimed to entertain, to teach and also to help. He called for donations publicly at various occasions or used his influence in academic circles, thus contributing to the founding of one school (in Alpl, his home village), the building of two churches (one in Mürzzuschlag and one in St. Kathrein, rebuilt after it burned down) and other benevolent actions.

== Honors ==
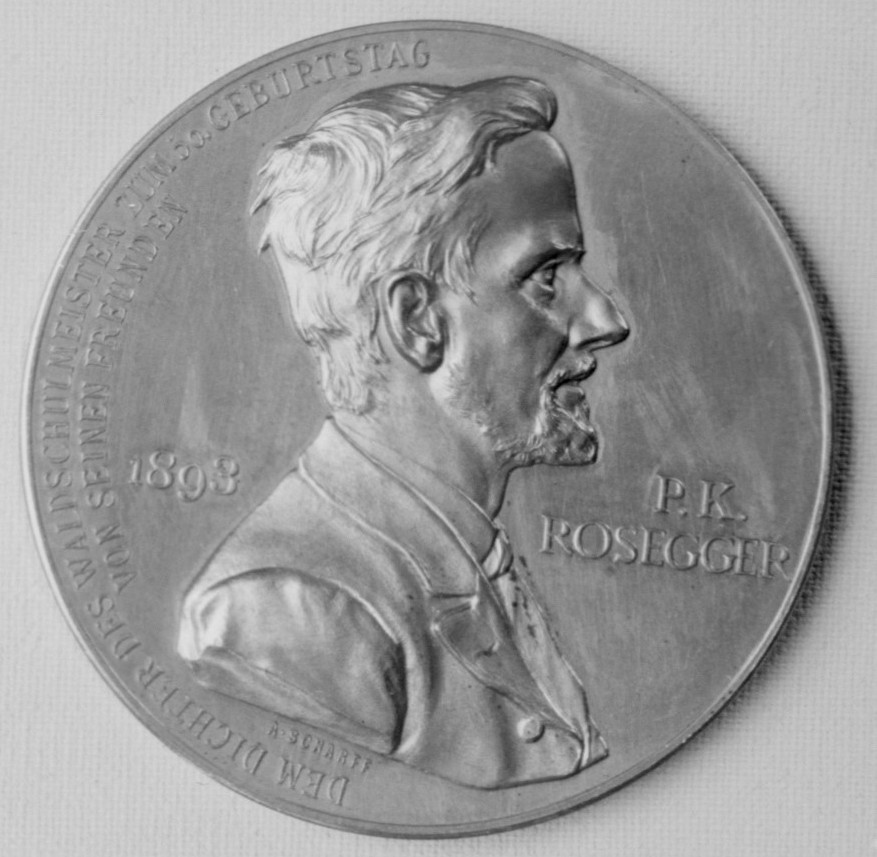
Medallion made to honor Peter Rosegger's 50th birthday in 1893.

In 1903, at his 60th birthday, he was honoured by receiving the "Ehrendoktorwürde" (Doctor honoris causa) of the University of Heidelberg. The University of Vienna and the University of Graz also awarded him with similar decorations, and the German emperor Wilhelm II, as well as the Austrian emperor Franz Josef I of Austria gave Rosegger medals of honour (namely, the "Kronenorden 2. Klasse" and the "Ehrenabzeichen für Kunst und Wissenschaft"). He became citizen of honour in Graz and Vienna, and Franz Josef's successor Karl presented the ex-farmer-boy-now-national-poet with the Franz-Joseph-medal, a high-ranking accolade for an author.

== Late life and death ==
Rosegger, who had been ill frequently and seriously, travelled back to his home in Krieglach in May 1918 in order to die where "the beautiful legend of the forest-farmer boy" had once begun, in the woodlands of the Styrian Alps.

His birth house, the former "Forest School" (Waldschule) he helped to found in Alpl in 1902 and his house in Krieglach, where he lived until his death in 1918, are museums today. The region where he came from (the mountains of the Fischbacher Alps south of Krieglach and Mürzzuschlag) are now unofficially named "Waldheimat" ("Home in the Forest") after the name he gave it himself. The tourism industry in the region still profits from Rosegger's enduring popularity among readers.

== Selected works ==
- Zither und Hackbrett (poems in Styrian dialect, 1869)
- Volksleben in Steiermark ("People's Life in Styria"), 1875
- Die Schriften des Waldschulmeisters ("Manuscripts of a Forest-school Master"), 1875
- Waldheimat (transl. as The Forest Farm, 1912), 1877
- Der Gottsucher ("the God-seeker"), 1883
- Heidepeters Gabriel, 1886
- Jakob der Letzte ("Jakob the Last One"), 1888
- Als ich noch jung war ("When I Was Young"), 1895
- Das ewige Licht ("the Eternal Light"), 1896
- Der Waldjugend (Leipzig, 1898, illustrated by Alfred Mailick)
- Erdsegen ("Earth's Blessing"), 1900
- Als ich noch der Waldbauernbub war ("When I Was a Forest-farmer Boy"), 1902

== Film and television adaptations ==
- I.N.R.I. (dir. Robert Wiene, 1923)
- Das Siegel Gottes (dir. Alfred Stöger, 1949)
- Die Försterbuben (dir. Robert A. Stemmle, 1955)
- Die fröhliche Wallfahrt (dir. Ferdinand Dörfler, 1956)
- Als ich noch der Waldbauernbub war... (1963, TV film)
- Aus meiner Waldheimat (1963, TV film)
- Als ich beim Käthele im Wald war (1963, TV film)
- Am Tage des Gerichts (1965, TV film)
- Jakob der Letzte (dir. Axel Corti, 1976, TV film)
- Waldheimat (1983–1984, TV series, 26 episodes)
- Die Försterbuben (dir. Peter Patzak, 1984, TV film)
- Erdsegen (dir. Karin Brandauer, 1986, TV film)

== See also ==
- List of Austrian writers
