= Nina Rindt =

Finnish fashion model (born 1943)

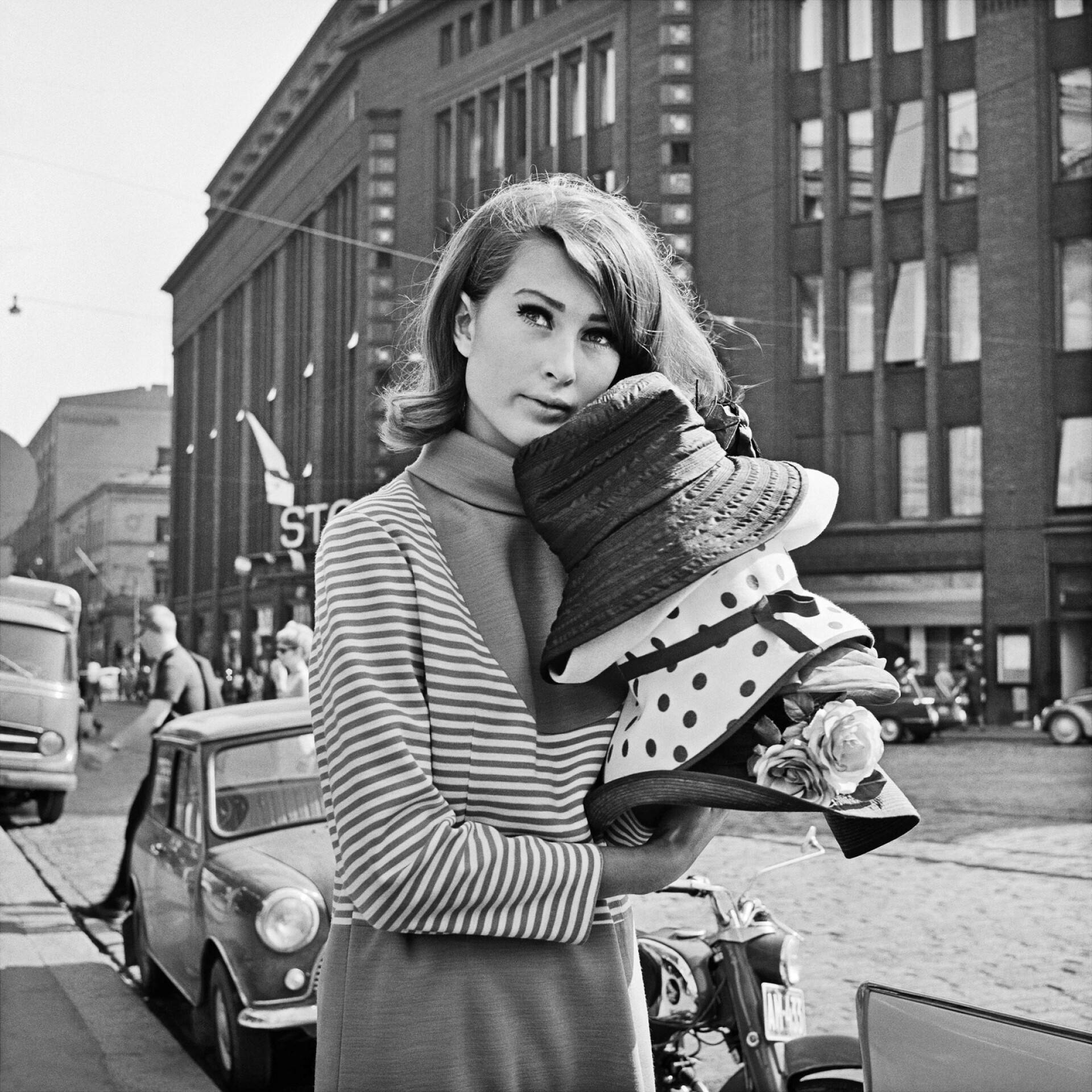
- Rindt in 1965
- Born: Nina Madeline Lincoln; 1943 (age 82–83)
- Occupation: Fashion model
- Spouse(s): Jochen Rindt (m. 1967; died 1970) Phillip Martyn (m. 1972; div. 1974) Alexander Hood, 4th Viscount Bridport (m. 1979; div. 1999)
- Children: 3
- Father: Curt Lincoln

Nina Madeline Rindt (née Lincoln, also formerly known as Nina Hood, Viscountess Bridport; born 1943) is a Finnish former fashion model, Formula One motor racing personality, and member (by marriage) of the British aristocracy.

She is best known for being the wife, and later the widow, of German-born, Austrian-raised race car driver Jochen Rindt (1942–1970), who was posthumously awarded the World Drivers' Championship for 1970 after dying in a practice session crash the day before that year's Italian Grand Prix.

== Early life and career ==
Rindt was born in 1943. Her father, Curt Lincoln, was a wealthy Finnish racing driver and tennis player, who made one Davis Cup appearance for Finland. Her brother, Lars, also represented Finland in tennis.

After beginning her education in Finland, Rindt was sent to boarding school in Montreux, Switzerland, to complete it. She then started a course in haute couture in Brussels, but abandoned it when her relationship with Jochen Rindt became 'official'. An "extraordinary beauty", she chose instead to begin a career as a fashion model in London, Paris and New York, primarily to maintain her independence from Jochen Rindt.

As a model, she gained a prized reputation, and posed for leading magazines such as Vogue, Life and Look. Her friends in the fashion industry included Twiggy, one of the first international supermodels and a fashion icon of the 1960s.

== Relationship with Jochen Rindt ==
In the early 1960s, Jochen Rindt became acquainted with Curt Lincoln, as they were both competing in Formula Junior car racing. His first encounter with Lincoln's daughter Nina, however, was at Zürs, a ski resort in the Vorarlberg, Austria, in 1963. He was twenty one, and she was twenty. Before long, Rindt was taking a greater interest in Nina than in Curt.

During Jochen Rindt's Formula One career, which began at the Austrian Grand Prix in 1964, Nina Rindt was often seen and photographed in the pit lane at Grand Prix race meetings.

According to Amanda McLaren, daughter of Bruce McLaren, Jochen Rindt's first Formula One teammate (at Cooper in 1965):

"In the '50s and '60s, the wives and the girlfriends were really important to the team as they made the tea and coffee, and made all the sandwiches, as there was no on-site corporate hospitality. They also did all the time keeping and lap scoring."

Nina Rindt is now synonymous with the Universal Genève Compax model chronograph wristwatch she used to wear trackside on Grand Prix weekends. It had a 'panda dial' (white main dial with black subdials) and a Bund-type watch strap.

Rindt was also photographed many times in the pits with a bright orange Omega stopwatch. However, she was a private person, who never posed for trackside photographs, and seldom gave interviews.

The Rindts were married in 1967. As a married couple, they lived on the shores of Lake Geneva, Switzerland. They also became the parents of a daughter, Natasha (sometimes spelled Natascha), in 1968.

At the end of the 1970 Formula 1 season, when Jochen Rindt became the only posthumous World Driver's Champion, there was no official trophy to be awarded. In November of that year, however, Jackie Stewart, the 1969 champion, presented Nina Rindt with the Champion Challenge Trophy, which was always given to the champion driver.

According to Oliver Owen of The Observer, "[t]he presentation ... remains one of motor racing's most poignant moments."

== Later life ==
In the 1970s, Nina Rindt was married briefly to Phillip Martyn, and her married surname became Martyn.

Born in New Zealand and raised in England, Phillip Martyn was "the world's first self-professed professional backgammon player", and a friend of Jackie Stewart's. In the early 1970s, as the ambience of the international backgammon competition circuit morphed from ‘English Country House’ to an international jet set, he moved to Lausanne in Switzerland.

While married to Martyn, Rindt gave birth to a second daughter, Tamara, but the marriage did not last.

On 5 December 1979, Rindt was married a third time, to Alexander Nelson Hood, 4th Viscount Bridport of Cricket St. Thomas, a British investment banker, and her married surname became Hood. She was styled Viscountess Bridport of Cricket St. Thomas, and, less formally, Nina Hood, Lady Bridport. In 1983, she gave birth to a third child, the Hon Anthony Nelson Hood. She and Viscount Bridport were divorced in 1999.

Since that divorce, Rindt has generally avoided the public eye. In 2000, however, she and Natasha were present when the city of Graz, Jochen Rindt's home town, unveiled a bronze plaque at his childhood home in remembrance of him, on the 30th anniversary of his death. A decade later, in 2010, she attended the opening in Vienna of a photo exhibition about Jochen Rindt, entitled "Formula 1's first rock star".

More recently, on 7 October 2021, Rindt, her daughter Natasha and granddaughter Sophia, and Jochen Rindt's half brother Uwe Eisleben, represented the Rindt family at the unveiling of a plaque at the inauguration of Jochen-Rindt-Platz (transl. Jochen Rindt Place (or Square)), in the newly developing district of Reininghaus in Graz. The ceremony was part of a commemorative event, "Jochen Rindt - The World Champion from Graz", which included a reception at an exhibition, "Jochen Rindt, Mythos, Graz" at the Graz Museum, also attended by the guests of honour.

== Tributes ==
In 2011, La Gazzetta dello Sport, an Italian sports newspaper, named Rindt as the most beautiful Formula One wife of all time.

As of 2014, and also 2024, the dessert menu at Kosmos, a highly regarded traditional Finnish restaurant in Helsinki, included "Chilled Chocolate Cheesecake Nina Lincoln’s style". The cheesecake's recipe had previously been included in Suuri leivontakirja (transl. The Big Baking Book) published in 1987 by Kotiliesi, a Finnish family and women's magazine.

In the 2010s and 2020s, Rindt has been described in English language publications as a "secret", "underrated", and "forgotten" style icon. She has also been praised as having a "cool chic avant-garde look", and as being "... kind of too cool for words." According to one admiring observer:

"You could easily recognize Nina by her hats! She had the art of pairing her famous green Fedora capeline, a Greek sailor's cap or a scarf, with a mini skirt, flared trousers with simple tops: rolled-up shirts, graphic T-shirts or Tunisian tops. Flanked by wide glasses and a few jewels, we easily spy out her slender silhouette and her super elegant look. A cool chic style that hasn't aged a bit, quite the contrary!"

Additionally, the now-classic Universal Genève Compax model of chronograph that Rindt used to wear trackside has come to be nicknamed the 'Nina Rindt watch' in her honour. Soon after that nickname had caught on (and had led to a surge in demand for the chronograph), its 'reverse panda' counterpart (black main dial with white subdials) was given, in the lexicon of watch collectors, the corresponding nickname 'Evil Nina'.

As of 2020, Rindt still had her Compax chronograph in her possession; at least at that time, its main hands were non-standard.
