= Weekend of a Champion =

- Directed by: Roman Polanski
- Written by: Frank Simon
- Produced by: Roman Polanski
- Starring: Jackie Stewart; Roman Polanski; Helen Stewart
- Cinematography: Bill Brayne
- Edited by: Derek York
- Production company: Anglo-EMI
- Distributed by: Pathé (France); Submarine Deluxe (US)
- Release date: 22 June 1972 (Berlin International Film Festival)
- Running time: 80 minutes 93 minutes (re-release with postscript)
- Country: United Kingdom
- Languages: English; French

Weekend of a Champion (alternately titled Afternoon of a Champion) is a 1972 British documentary film that captures the effort of British Formula One racing driver Jackie Stewart to compete in the 1971 Monaco Grand Prix in Monte Carlo. Stewart's friend Roman Polanski produced the film and shadows him throughout the weekend of the race.

The film premiered at the 1972 Berlin Film Festival and— after a small theatrical release in Europe— was unscreened for 40 years. The archive in possession of the negative contacted Polanski, inquiring as to whether they should keep the film or throw it away.

Polanski then restored the film from the original print, remixing and slightly recutting it. An approximately 15-minute epilogue was added, showing Polanski and Stewart reminiscing in present-day Monaco, having a conversation about their friendship, the evolution of racing safety, hairstyles, and life in general.

== Production ==
Having no experience with documentaries, Polanski recruited Frank Simon to direct the film. They both accompanied Stewart to Monaco for that year's Grand Prix.

Four decades later, the Technicolor lab in London contacted Polanski to say that they were getting rid of all their old negatives. In conversations with producer Brett Ratner, the idea of polishing it up for a reissue took shape.

About the film, Stewart said "working with Roman Polanski was very nice for me not only because he was a good friend, but when the movies come out, it's very straightforward. It's cinema vérité and it showed how it was."

== Cast ==
- Graham Hill
- François Cevert
- Joan Collins
- Ringo Starr
- Grace Kelly
- Prince Rainier III
- Jackie Stewart
- Helen Stewart
- Roman Polanski
- Ken Tyrrell
- Nina Rindt
- Juan Manuel Fangio

== Production ==
Finance came from EMI Films.

== Release ==
The re-released film was screened out of competition as an Official Selection at the Cannes Film Festival in 2013. It had a limited U.S. theatrical release on 22 November 2013.

=== Home media ===
A Region 2 DVD was released by Universal Pictures UK on 4 November 2013.

A super 8 mm version was released by UFA (Germany) in 1980 as a cut down on two reels with running time of about 33 minutes.

== Reception ==
=== Accolades ===
Award	Category	Outcome
22nd Berlin International Film Festival	Documentary	Special Recognition

=== Critical reception ===
Weekend of a Champion received generally favorable reviews from critics. The film has a 71% "fresh" rating on the review aggregator website Rotten Tomatoes, based on 14 reviews. Metacritic rates Weekend of a Champion a score of 63/100 based on 9 reviews ("generally favorable").

Calum Marsh of The Village Voice stated that "the result is a pleasure, perhaps as much for audiences as for Polanski; it's a chance to luxuriate in the atmosphere of world-class Formula One, here a lavish free-love party interrupted now and again by a few laps on the track. In a way, Weekend of a Champion is less about the sport than the extravagant lifestyle sports stardom apparently precipitates — the tireless carousing, the inexhaustible atmosphere of celebration. Stewart and Polanski potter about Monaco like kings surveying the scope of their lands.".

Mike D'Angelo of The A.V. Club gave the film a B− grade and stated that it "serves as a terrific primer on auto racing. Its climactic chronicle of the actual Grand Prix is a bit pedestrian (forgive that pun), due to the nature of Monaco's street circuit; Simon and Polanski just can't secure many worthwhile angles on the action. [...] All in all, the original 1972 version of Weekend Of A Champion, which ran a fleet 80 minutes, was probably a thorough if minor pleasure. Unfortunately, that's not the version now being released. Polanski says that he felt the need to re-edit the picture in order to make its rhythm more palatable to a modern audience; presumably, that means the new version is punchier, though it's hard to say without being able to make a direct comparison. Much more damagingly, he's added a 20-minute present-day epilogue in which he and Stewart sit in their same hotel room from 1971 and discuss the various ways in which they, Monaco, and Formula One have changed over the past four decades."

Dade Hayes, writing for Forbes, stated that "[f]or fans of 1970s "New Hollywood" cinema, Formula 1 auto racing and exaggerated sideburns, the release of Weekend of a Champion is like Christmas morning. [...] Sensory pleasures abound in the film, which captures the swirl of royalty and celebrity in Monaco, but also the rigors of elite-level racing and the uncanny acumen of Stewart".

Jeannette Catsoulis of The New York Times gave the film 2.5 stars out of 5 and stated that "[t]he combination of fast cars, gorgeous men and Monte Carlo sounds a lot like heaven, but Frank Simon's Weekend of a Champion will appeal mostly to motor-racing enthusiasts and movie archaeologists. [...] [T]his newly restored and updated documentary offers a minor sidebar to two major careers."
