= Jochen Rindt =

Racing driver (1942–1970)

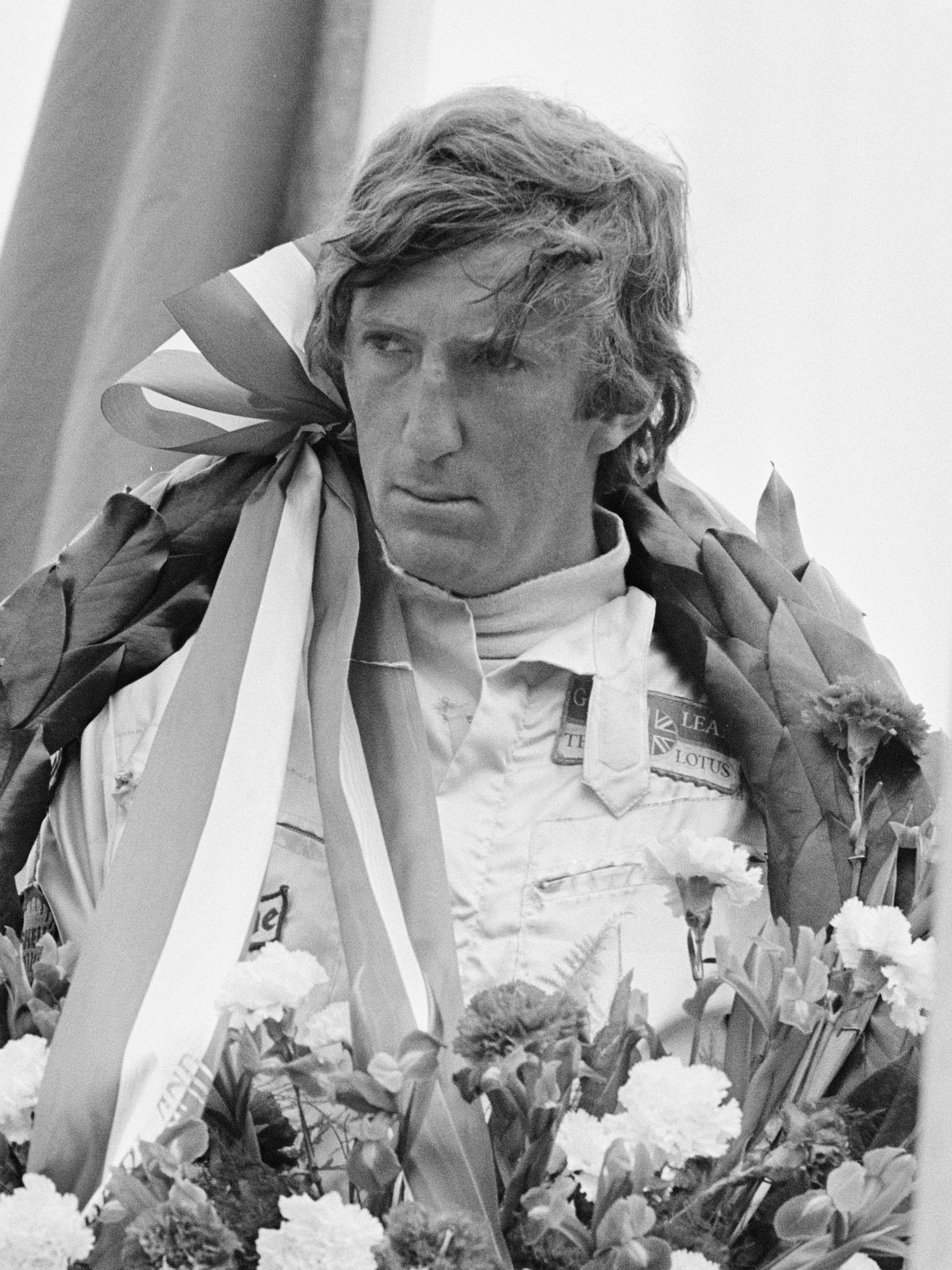
- Rindt at the 1970 Dutch Grand Prix
- Born: Karl Jochen Rindt; 18 April 1942; Mainz, People's State of Hesse, German Reich
- Died: 5 September 1970 (aged 28); Monza Circuit, Lombardy, Italy
- Cause of death: Injuries sustained at the 1970 Italian Grand Prix
- Spouse: Nina Lincoln (m. 1967)
- Children: 1

Formula One World Championship career
- Nationality: (Austria) Austrian (Note: Rindt raced under an Austrian license despite only having German citizenship.)
- Active years: 1964–1970
- Team(s): Walker, Cooper, Brabham, Lotus
- Entries: 62 (60 starts)
- Championships: 1 (1970)
- Wins: 6
- Podiums: 13
- Career points: 107 (109) (Note: Up until 1990, not all points scored by a driver contributed to their final World Championship tally (see list of points scoring systems for more information). Numbers without parentheses are Championship points; numbers in parentheses are total points scored.)
- Pole positions: 10
- Fastest laps: 3
- First entry: 1964 Austrian Grand Prix
- First win: 1969 United States Grand Prix
- Last win: 1970 German Grand Prix
- Last entry: 1970 Italian Grand Prix

24 Hours of Le Mans career
- Years: 1964–1967
- Teams: NART, Ford, Porsche
- Best finish: 1st (1965)
- Class wins: 1 (1965)

Karl Jochen Rindt (German: [ˈjɔxn̩ ˈʁɪnt]; 18 April 1942 – 5 September 1970) was a racing driver who competed under the Austrian flag in Formula One from 1964 to 1970. Rindt won the Formula One World Drivers' Championship in 1970 with Lotus, and remains the only driver to have won the World Drivers' Championship posthumously, following his death at the Italian Grand Prix; he won six Grands Prix across seven seasons. In endurance racing, Rindt won the 24 Hours of Le Mans in 1965 with NART.

Born in Germany and raised in Austria, Rindt started motor racing in 1961. Switching to single-seaters in 1963, he was successful in both Formula Junior and Formula Two. In 1964, Rindt made his debut in Formula One at the Austrian Grand Prix, before securing a full drive with Cooper for 1965. After mixed results with the team, he moved to Brabham for 1968 and then Lotus in 1969. It was at Lotus that Rindt found a competitive car, although he was often concerned about the safety of the notoriously unreliable Lotus vehicles. He won his first Formula One race at the 1969 United States Grand Prix. During the 1970 season, mainly racing the revolutionary Lotus 72, he won five of the first nine races. In practice for the Italian Grand Prix at Monza, he spun into the guardrails after a failure on his car's brake shaft, and a poorly installed crash barrier gave way. Rindt was pronounced dead while on the way to hospital. As his closest competitor Jacky Ickx was unable to score sufficient points in the remaining races of the season, Rindt was awarded the World Championship posthumously. Rindt left behind his wife, Nina, and a daughter, Natasha.

Overall, Rindt competed in 62 Grands Prix, winning six and achieving 13 podium finishes. He was also successful in sports car racing, winning the 1965 24 Hours of Le Mans paired with Masten Gregory in a Ferrari 250LM. Rindt was a popular figure in Austria and his success resulted in increased interest in motorsport and Formula One in particular. He hosted a monthly television show titled Motorama and set up a successful exhibition of racing cars in Vienna. During his time in Formula One, he was involved alongside Jackie Stewart in a campaign to improve safety in Formula One.

== Early life and family ==
Jochen Rindt was born on 18 April 1942 in Mainz, Germany, to an Austrian mother and German father. His mother had been a successful tennis player in her youth and, like her father, studied law. Rindt's parents owned a spice mill in Mainz, which he later inherited. They were killed in a bombing raid in Hamburg during the Second World War when he was 15 months old, after which he was raised by his maternal grandparents in Graz, Austria. Although his grandfather chose to retain Rindt's German citizenship, for his entire career he drove under an Austrian racing licence. In an interview, he described his heritage as a "terrible mixture" and, when asked if he felt more Austrian or German, said that he felt "like a European". Rindt had one half-brother, Uwe, through his mother.

Rindt's childhood friends and his brother described him as a "laddish child" who often performed tricks to amuse others. While on a skiing holiday, he broke his femoral neck, leading to several surgeries that left one leg four centimetres (1.6 in) shorter than the other. As a result of this, Rindt limped slightly for the rest of his life. At the age of sixteen, he received a moped and started racing his friends on motocross tracks. His time in school was troubled and he was excluded from schools several times. He said:

In the end I got thrown out and went to England to learn English. I learned to drive while I was in England but I was too young to get a licence. When I went back home I broke my leg skiing but I decided I was more than capable of driving myself – even though I had one leg in plaster. I actually drove without a licence for 18 months and then got caught the day before I was eligible to collect it.

Rindt's chances of obtaining a licence were put into further jeopardy because he had collected eight recorded misdemeanours with the police during his youth. In 1960, he received his first car, an old Volkswagen Beetle. His interest in motorsport greatly increased when he visited the 1961 German Grand Prix at the Nürburgring with school friends, including fellow future Formula One driver Helmut Marko.

== Racing career ==
=== Beginnings ===
Rindt drove his first race at the Flugplatzrennen in 1961, in his grandmother's Simca Montlhéry. After missing the official application period, he only entered after a friendly high-ranking motorsport functionary from Graz intervened on his behalf. During the race, he was black flagged for his dangerous driving style and therefore disqualified; he did not immediately return to the pit lane as he was unaware of the regulations. Rindt entered several rallies with his Simca but did not achieve good results. It was only when he was provided with a race-prepared Alfa Romeo GT 1300 at cost price and with free servicing by a local dealer that he became more successful. In the Alfa Romeo, he achieved eight victories.

In 1963, Rindt switched to Formula Junior with the assistance of Kurt Bardi Barry, a wealthy owner of a travel agency and one of Austria's leading drivers at the time; Barry gave him his one-year-old Cooper T67 and the two men formed a partnership, driving to races together. Rindt was fastest in practice for his first race in Vallelunga, a race won by Barry, and took victory in his second at Cesenatico. In the race, Rindt had taken advantage of an accident in the early stages. While most drivers slowed for the incoming ambulance, he raced ahead between the straw barriers and the parked medical vehicle to take the lead. At the time, he was notorious for his dangerous style, almost crashing into the spectators at a race in the streets of Budapest.

=== Formula Two ===
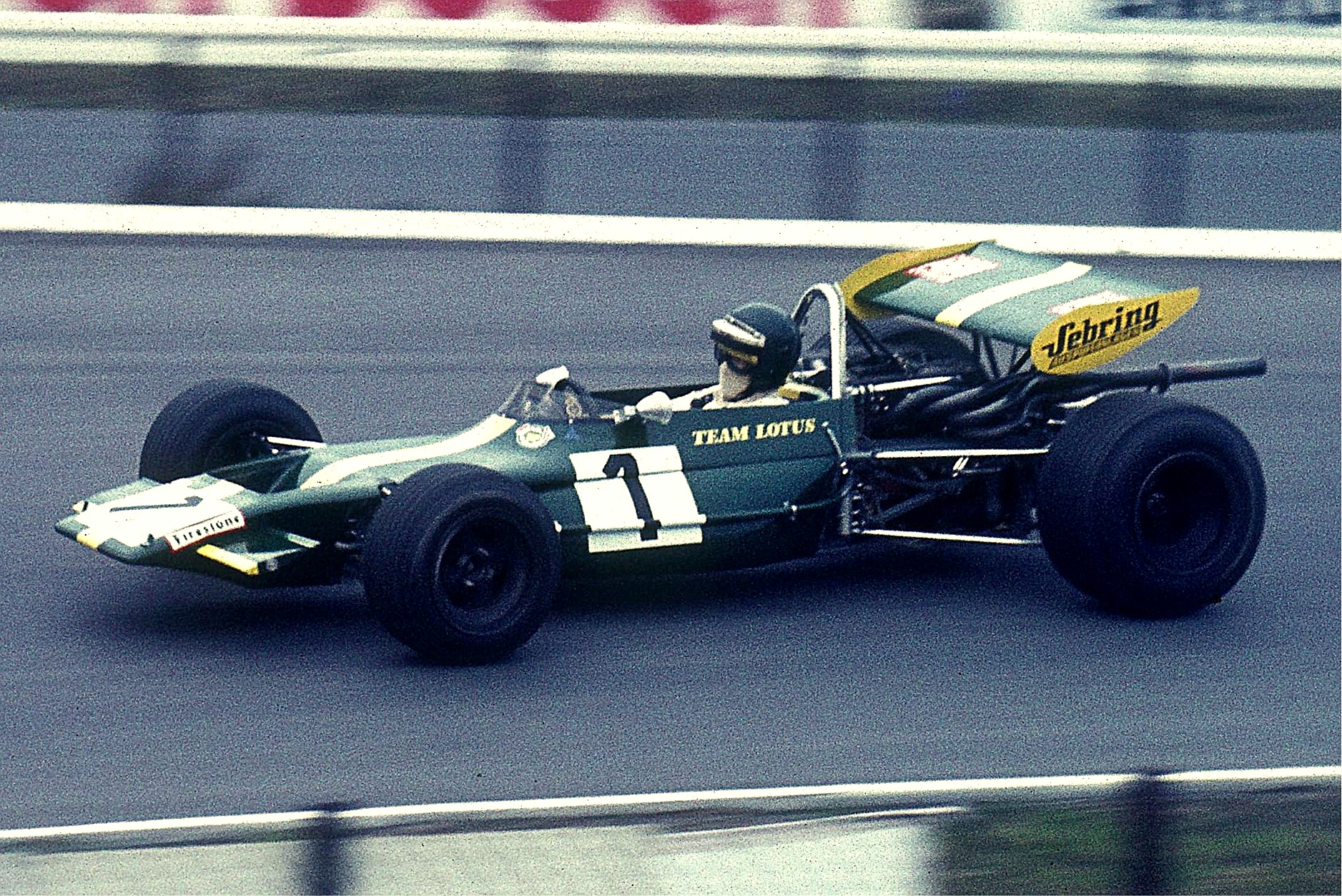
Rindt in a Formula 2 Lotus 69 at the Eifelrennen in 1970

Rindt was highly successful in Formula Two racing, amassing a total of 29 victories. He once again entered the series in partnership with Barry, driving Brabham cars. The engines provided by Cosworth were slower and inconsistent in performance; Rindt responded to his reduced pace by declaring: "Then I just brake two metres later." He entered his first F2 race in April 1964 at the Preis von Wien at Aspern, retiring from both heats. The international motor racing world first took notice of him on 18 May 1964, when Rindt won the London Trophy race at the Crystal Palace circuit in a Brabham BT10 ahead of Graham Hill.

Like many other drivers at the time, Rindt continued to race in Formula Two races alongside his duties in Formula One; his last F2 appearance was the Festspielpreis der Salzburg in August 1970. In 1967, he dominated Formula Two, winning nine races in his Brabham BT23. As an experienced Formula One driver, he was graded "A", meaning his results did not count towards the championship, and the title went to Jacky Ickx. Still, his performances led him to be called "king of Formula 2" by the racing press. He had a long-standing relationship with Roy Winkelmann, and drove with his team until it closed at the end of 1969.

=== Sports cars ===
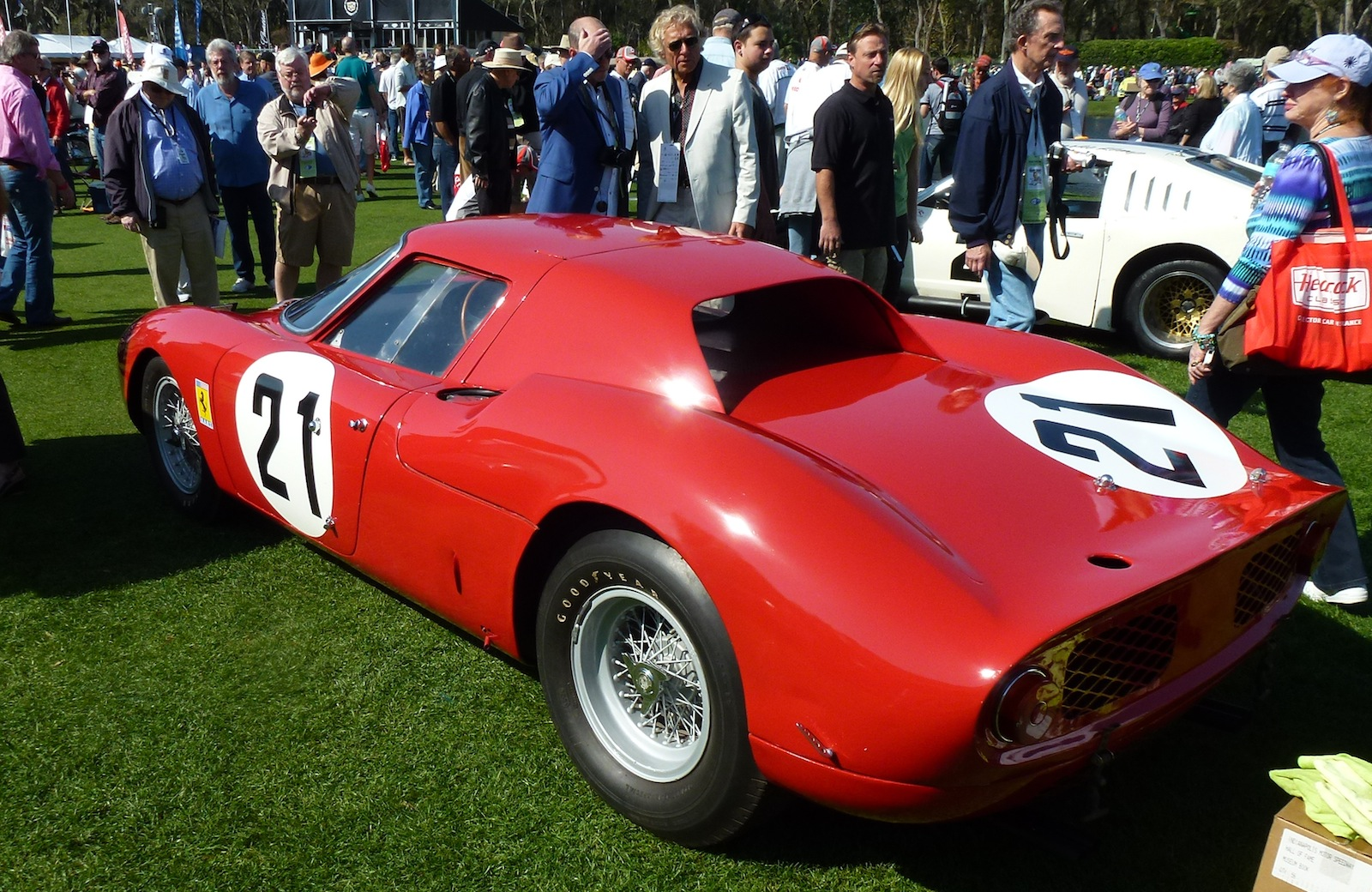
The Ferrari 250LM that took Rindt to his win at the 1965 24 Hours of Le Mans

Along with single-seater racing, Rindt took up sports car racing in the mid-1960s. Rindt started at the 24 Hours of Le Mans a total of four times. At his debut in 1964, sharing a Ferrari 250LM with David Piper, the car retired too early for Rindt even to take the wheel.

Rindt's best result came the following year at the 1965 24 Hours of Le Mans. Sharing the drive of a Ferrari 250LM with American Masten Gregory for the North American Racing Team, Rindt won the event. Neither driver was happy to race in a seemingly uncompetitive car. A 1998 article in Motor Sport stated that neither appeared to show much interest in the race, but instead it was "more a case of 'hope it breaks soon' so they could draw their money and split". At the start, the drivers had to run to their cars; Rindt entered with a forward roll that allowed him to get his foot on the throttle instantly and take an early lead. The pair experienced considerable trouble in the early part of the race; the car did not restart during Gregory's first pit stop. Later, the engine failed partially and Gregory brought the car into the pits on only six of twelve cylinders. At this point, Rindt had already changed back into his civilian clothes, expecting their race to be over. After thirty minutes of repairs, the car restarted and Rindt and Gregory agreed to drive the rest of the event "flat out", at full speed and with the accompanying risk. Rindt drove most of the night, advancing from 18th to third position by dawn. Gregory persuaded Rindt to let him drive the closing part of the race, suspecting that his young teammate might not drive moderately enough to nurse the car to the finish. Jacky Ickx later recalled that the two had driven "like maniacs". Even so, the car survived, handing the pair what Ickx called an "unexpected victory".

Later that year, Rindt drove, again in a Ferrari 250LM, at the 500 kilometre race at Zeltweg. He was able to win ahead of the better powered Ferrari of Mike Parkes owing to a special lever that manually activated the brake lights. Using the tool shortly before his actual braking point, Rindt was able to force Parkes to brake earlier than him which allowed him to stay ahead.

Apart from his 1965 victory, Rindt never finished the race in Le Mans. In 1966, his Ford GT40 (shared with Innes Ireland) suffered an engine failure. A year later, he drove a Porsche 907 with Gerhard Mitter until their camshaft failed.

=== Formula One ===
==== Cooper (1964–1967) ====
Rindt made his Formula One debut at his home race, the 1964 Austrian Grand Prix, in a loaned Brabham BT11 supplied by the Rob Walker Racing Team. He retired on the 58th lap with a broken steering column in his only Grand Prix of the season.

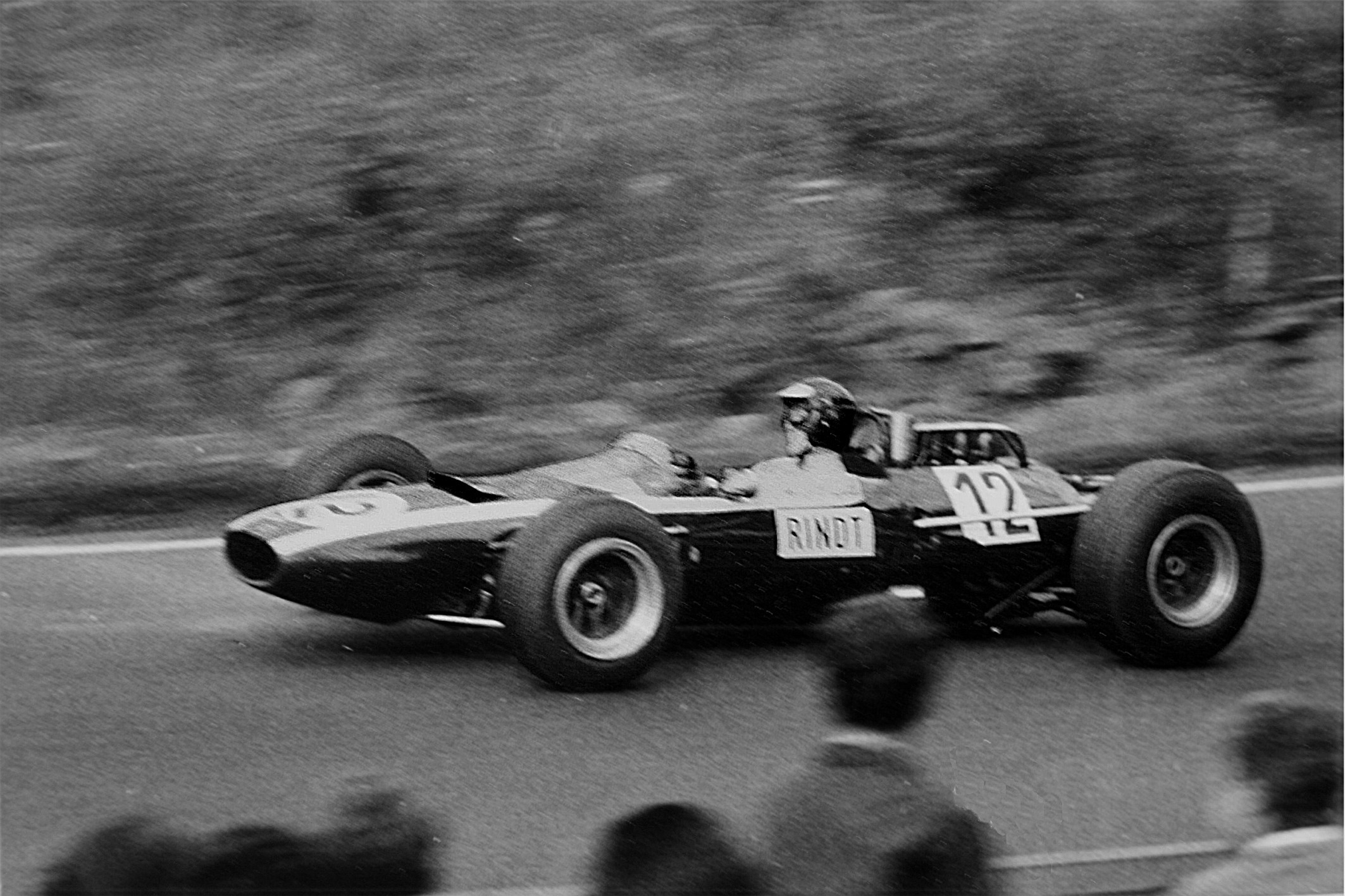
Rindt on his way to fourth place at the 1965 German Grand Prix

For the 1965 Formula One season, Rindt signed as a permanent driver with Cooper, paired with Bruce McLaren. He was not immediately successful as Cooper, formerly a top team, were struggling at the time. In his first race, the 1965 South African Grand Prix, he developed transistor trouble; the damage was initially repaired but the problem recurred and Rindt had to retire from the race. His best result was a fourth place at the German Grand Prix at the Nürburgring. He ended the season with four points, 13th in the championship.

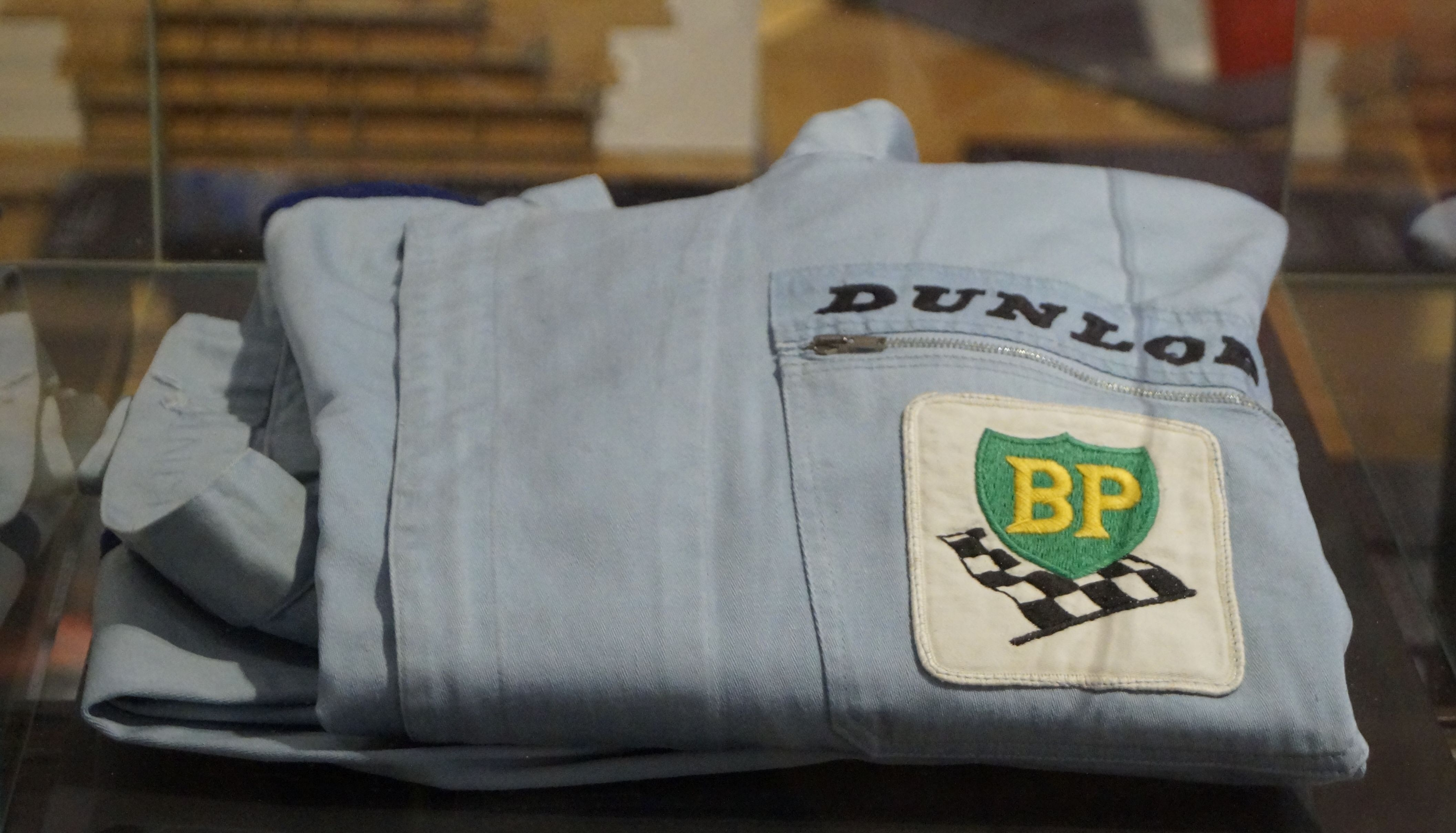
Rindt's overalls for the 1966 season

For 1966, Cooper introduced the T81 chassis and used nine-year old Maserati V12 engines, which were powerful but heavy. A new engine formula was introduced for the season, with the capacity doubled to three litres. Many teams struggled with the new rules, leaving Cooper competitive even with their old Maserati V12s. After McLaren left, Rindt became team leader until 1964 world champion John Surtees joined from Ferrari. At the second race of the year, the Belgian Grand Prix, Rindt overcame an engine failure in practice to qualify second, next to Surtees on the front row of the grid. In a race affected by heavy rain, he overtook Surtees for the lead on lap four. He spun several times on the wet track and suffered from a limited-slip differential, but held onto the lead until lap 21, when Surtees repassed him and won. It was Rindt's first ever podium finish in Formula One, after what Motor Sport magazine called a "very courageous" drive. Overall, he achieved three podium positions, handing him third place in the championship at the end of the year.

1967 was less successful, as Rindt only finished two races, the Belgian and Italian Grands Prix, both in fourth place. Six points meant that he ended the season in 13th place in the championship.

==== Brabham (1968) ====
Prior to 1968, Rindt received offers from every team except Lotus and Honda, and moved to Brabham, who had been world champions in the two previous seasons. Technical problems restricted him that year. Brabham's Repco V8 engine was not competitive against the now widely used Cosworth DFV and Rindt finished just two races, both in third place. At the season opener in South Africa on New Year's Day, Rindt placed third, being elevated by a late retirement from Jackie Stewart and closing on second-placed Graham Hill towards the end. The race was won by Jim Clark, a close friend of Rindt's. It was Clark's final Formula One race; he died three months later at a Formula Two race at Hockenheim. Rindt was deeply affected by his death, telling Austrian journalist Heinz Prüller: "If Jim Clark is not safe, what can happen to us?" His second podium finish came in heavy rain and fog at the Nürburgring at the German Grand Prix, a race dominated by Stewart, who finished four minutes ahead of Hill in second place. Rindt had closed on Hill in the latter stages of the race after the Englishman spun, and finished just four seconds behind after a close battle during the last lap. His eight points placed him twelfth in the championship at the end of the season.

During these years, he also raced in the Indianapolis 500 in both 1967 and 1968, but finished only 24th and 32nd, completing only five laps in 1968 after finishing slightly more than half of the 1967 race. After dropping out of the 1967 race, Rindt was interviewed on the radio network by Luke Walton. When asked what he thought of the "500", he said "not much". In an interview in 2014, Heinz Prüller recalled Rindt speaking about Indianapolis in 1967: "In Indianapolis, I always feel like I am on my way to my own funeral." At another occasion, he said about the track: "It is catastrophic, I only drive there because of the money."

==== Team Lotus (1969–1970) ====
===== 1969 season =====
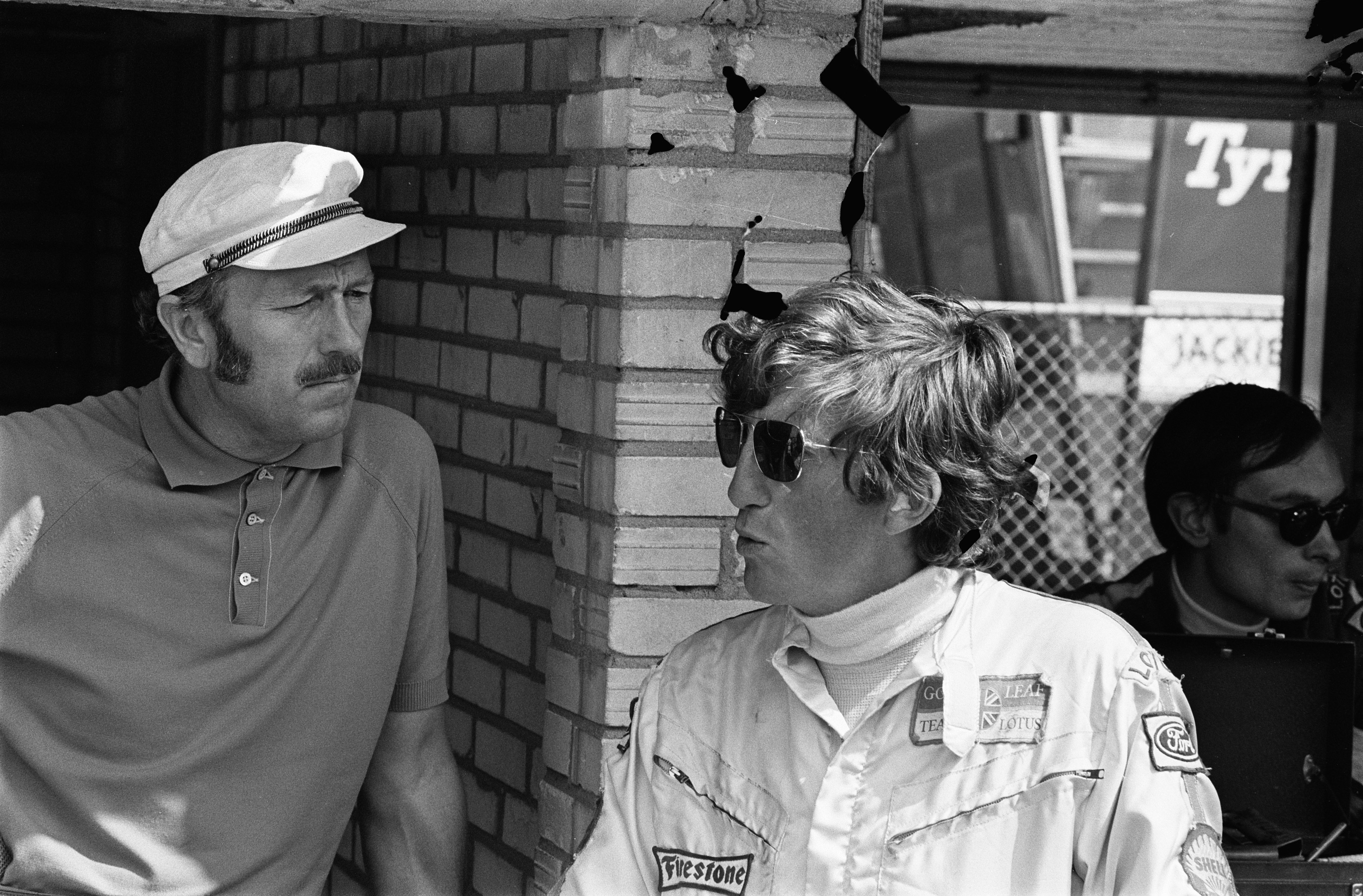
Rindt had a strained relationship with Lotus team owner Colin Chapman.

For the 1969 season, Rindt signed for the 1968 World Constructors' Champion Lotus, where he joined the defending Drivers' Champion Graham Hill. Rindt felt uncomfortable with the move, owing to the notorious unreliability of the Lotus car; in a twenty-month period between 1967 and 1969, the team was involved in 31 accidents. Hill alone had nine crashes between 1968 and 1970, which led him to joke: "Every time I am being overtaken by my own wheel, I know I am in a Lotus." When Rindt joined Lotus, his friend and de facto manager Bernie Ecclestone, who had negotiated the deal, remarked that they were aware that Brabham may have been a better choice of team but the speed of the Lotus gave Rindt a chance to win the championship. Rindt commented: "At Lotus, I can either be world champion or die." Because of his uncertainty about the wisdom of joining the team, Rindt did not sign the Lotus contract until shortly before the 1969 Spanish Grand Prix.

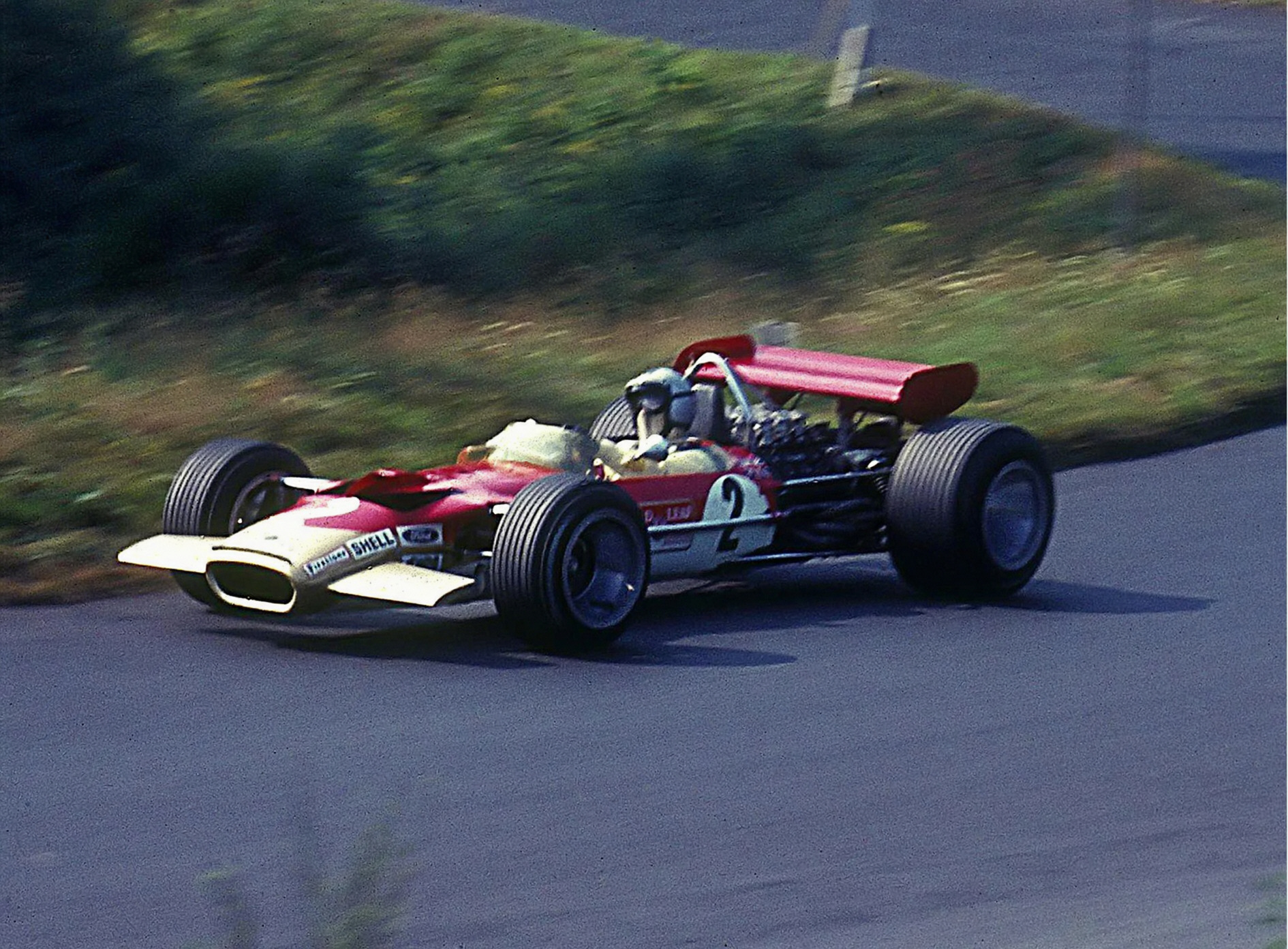
Rindt at the 1969 German Grand Prix

Rindt's hesitancy appeared justified when both he and Hill suffered high speed crashes at the Spanish Grand Prix at Montjuïc. In both instances, the suspension mounted wings on the cars broke off, causing accidents that could have killed either driver. The effect of the failure lifted Rindt's car off the track and into the barriers, where it collided with the stationary car of Hill, whose accident occurred at the same spot. Although Rindt only suffered a broken nose, one marshal lost an eye and another had his foot broken. Rindt was furious with Lotus's team owner, Colin Chapman, over the failure; he told a reporter after the accident: "I place the blame on him [Chapman] and rightfully so, because he should have calculated that the wing would break." In an interview on Austrian television a day later, he said: "These wings are insanity [ein Wahnsinn] in my eyes and should not be allowed on racing cars. ... But to get any wisdom into Colin Chapman's head is impossible." Asked whether he had lost trust in Lotus after the accident, he replied: "I never had any trust in Lotus", going on to describe his relationship with the team as "purely business". His accident left him sidelined for the Monaco Grand Prix, a race that Hill won.

Jackie Stewart later described Rindt's 1969 season as the year that he "came of age". At the end of the year, Motor Sport magazine called him "[t]he only driver to challenge Stewart seriously throughout the season", albeit placing only fourth in the championship. The poor reliability of the Lotus 49B affected him; he retired from seven races. At the British Grand Prix, Rindt fought a close battle with Stewart for the lead; both men were 90 seconds ahead of third-placed Jacky Ickx. The race was decided in Stewart's favour only when Rindt had to enter the pits after part of his car's bodywork started to rub on the tyre; he finished fourth. At the Italian Grand Prix, he was involved in a memorable finish. Having started from pole position, he traded the lead with Stewart and Piers Courage several times. During the last lap, Rindt, Stewart, McLaren, and Jean-Pierre Beltoise were running close together as they approached the finish line. Stewart took the win, only eight hundredths of a second ahead of Rindt, while fourth placed McLaren was also within two tenths of a second. It was the closest 1–2–3–4 finish in the history of the sport. Rindt recorded his maiden Grand Prix win at the penultimate race of the season at Watkins Glen, winning $50,000—the largest monetary prize in Formula One history at the time. His victory was overshadowed by a serious accident involving his teammate Hill, who crashed after a high speed puncture and suffered major leg injuries.

===== 1970 season =====
For 1970, Rindt's partner at Lotus was John Miles; Graham Hill had left the team to drive for Rob Walker's customer franchise. Rindt became the clear team leader. At the first Grand Prix of the season in South Africa, he qualified fourth, but eventually retired with an engine failure after a first lap incident with Chris Amon and Jack Brabham, the latter of whom went on to win for the final time in his career. At the following race, the Spanish Grand Prix, Lotus introduced their revolutionary new car design. Instead of one conventional front radiator, the Lotus 72 featured two, one on each side of the cockpit. Further innovations included torsion bar suspension in place of the widely used coil-springs, and all four brakes mounted inboard to reduce unsprung weight. During its first practice session, the left semi-axle of the car broke, sending Rindt into a spin. The car also proved ineffective in the race; Rindt retired after nine laps.

As the Lotus 72 was not as effective as the team hoped, it was returned to the factory to be re-built and Rindt used the old Lotus 49 for the next race in Monaco. The necessity of using tyres intended for the new design made the older car unstable. Seemingly unaffected by this, Rindt produced what his race engineer Herbie Blash called "the race of his life". From eighth on the grid, he worked his way through the field on a track notorious for presenting few overtaking opportunities. In the closing stages, he was second, steadily closing the gap on leader Jack Brabham. On the final lap, on the final corner, Brabham braked too late, touched the kerbstone and went straight ahead into the straw bales, allowing Rindt through to take his first victory of the season. Rindt used the Lotus 49 one last time at the Belgian Grand Prix, a race at which he heavily criticised the organisers for installing guardrails that had gaps of several metres between them. He had originally started practice in the remodelled 72, but the car came to a halt early in the session with a broken lower wishbone, forcing Rindt to switch cars once more. Despite engine troubles during the rest of practice, he managed to qualify on the front row, but later retired with another engine failure.

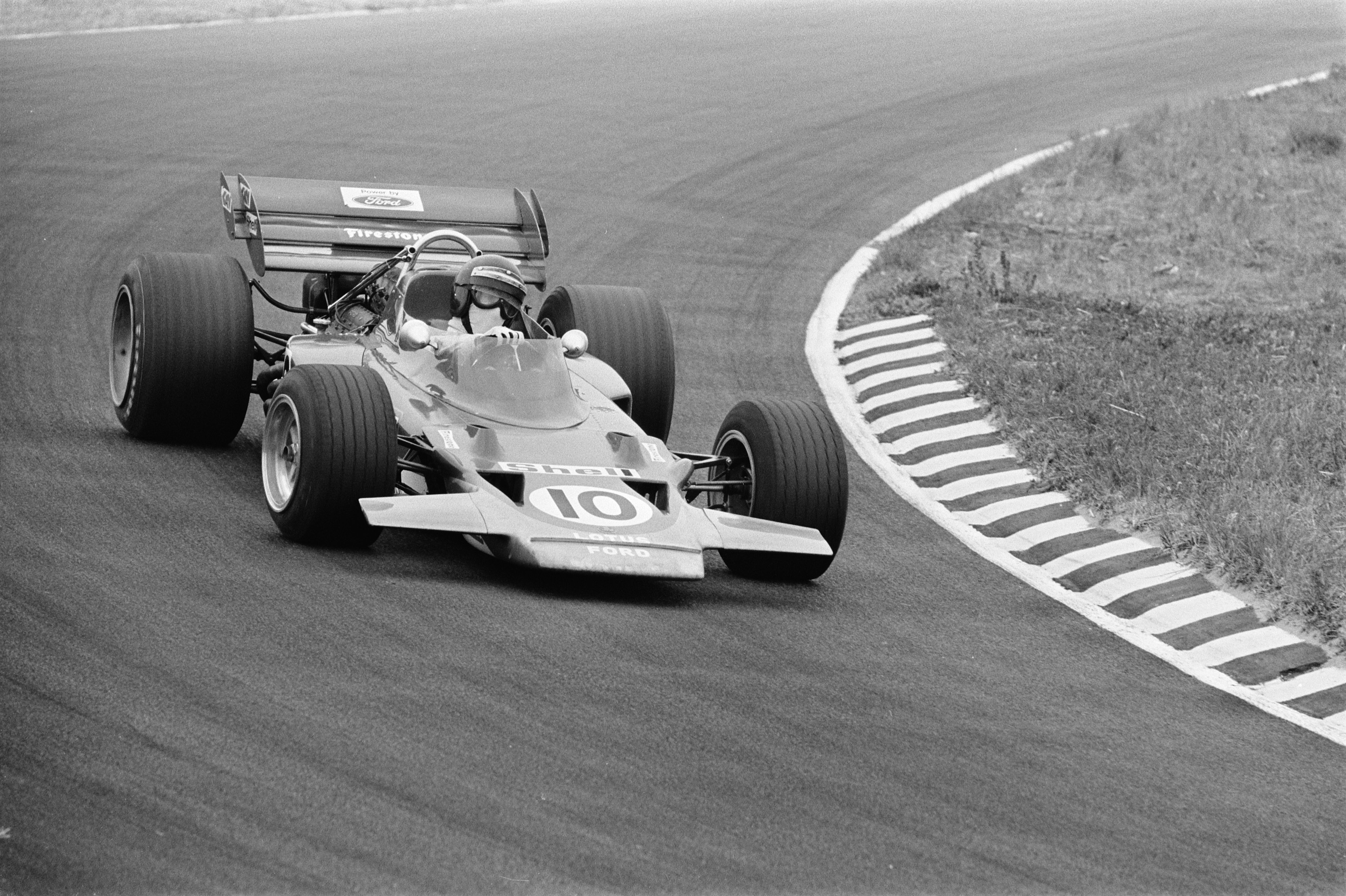
Rindt took the Lotus 72's maiden victory at the 1970 Dutch Grand Prix.

At the Dutch Grand Prix, Rindt eventually used the new Lotus 72, better sorted after alterations had been made. He set pole position in the final practice session, almost a quarter of a second ahead of his closest challenger, Stewart. Rindt went on to take his maiden victory in the Lotus 72, but it was not a joyful occasion for him; on lap 23, his close friend Piers Courage, with whom he had eaten dinner just the night before, died in a fiery crash. Rindt was heavily shaken by the loss of yet another fellow driver and contemplated retirement.

After the success at Zandvoort, Rindt gained confidence in the new Lotus 72, describing it as "the best racing car that exists at the moment". But he continued to have problems. During practice for the French Grand Prix, Rindt opted to drop his new all-enveloping Bell-Star crash helmet, finding it too hot. He went back to using his open-front helmet, only to be hit in the face by a stone from another car, causing a deep cut on his right cheek. He also suffered a steering failure on his car. Furious over yet another mechanical problem, he stormed into the Lotus garage and yelled at Colin Chapman: "If this happens again and I survive, I will kill all of you!" Rindt was still able to win the race, taking the lead in the championship. The next race was the British Grand Prix at Brands Hatch. Jacky Ickx established an early lead ahead of Brabham and Rindt, but when Ickx's transmission failed, Rindt seized the opportunity to pass Brabham for the lead. Brabham was then able to regain the top spot on lap 69 as Rindt missed a gear and looked the certain winner, only to repeat his misfortune of Monaco: on the last lap, he ran out of fuel, allowing Rindt to take his third win in a row. His victory was cast into doubt shortly after the race when Chief Scrutineer Cecil Mitchell found the rear aerofoil not at the regulated height. Rindt was provisionally disqualified, only to be reinstated as winner after three hours of deliberation.

The German Grand Prix was originally set to take place at its traditional venue, the Nürburgring. The Grand Prix Drivers' Association (GPDA), represented by Rindt and Graham Hill, demanded changes to the circuit to increase safety, including Armco barriers along the entire 22.8 kilometres (14.2 mi) of the Nordschleife. No agreement was reached and the Grand Prix moved to Hockenheim, where Rindt took his fourth victory in succession. The race was another two-way fight, this time between Rindt and Ickx, who exchanged the lead several times. This meant that he could have secured the drivers' title at his home event at the Austrian Grand Prix. He set the Lotus 72 on pole position, to the delight of the crowd, but retired from the race with an engine failure. The title decision was therefore postponed to the next race in Monza.

== Death and legacy ==
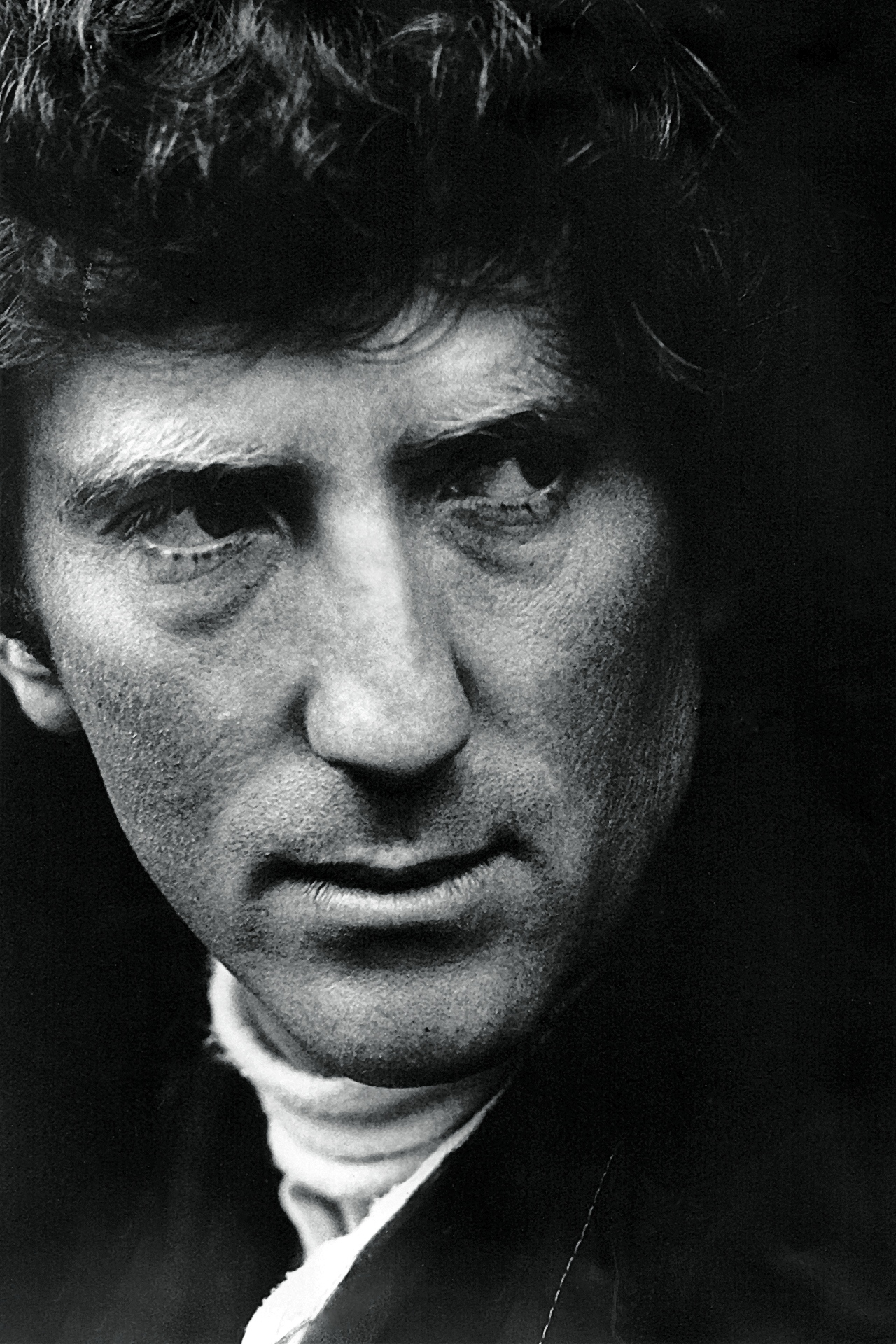
Rindt in 1969

The paddock moved to the Italian Grand Prix at Monza, a track known for high speeds; drivers often used the slipstream of cars in front to increase their pace. Because of this, many teams, including Lotus, opted to remove the rear wings mounted on the cars to reduce drag and further increase speeds. The more powerful flat-12 Ferraris of Jacky Ickx and Clay Regazzoni had been up to 16 km/h (10 mph) faster than the Lotus at the previous race in Austria. Rindt's teammate John Miles was unhappy with the wingless setup in Friday practice, reporting that the car "wouldn't run straight". Rindt reported no such problems, and Chapman recalled that Rindt reported the car to be "almost 800 rpm faster on the straight" without wings.

On the following day (5 September 1970), Rindt ran with higher gear ratios fitted to his car to take advantage of the reduced drag, increasing the car's potential top speed to 330 km/h (205 mph). On his fifth lap of his practice session, he crashed heavily at the approach to the Parabolica corner. Denny Hulme, who was following Rindt at the time, described the accident as follows:

Jochen was following me for several laps and slowly catching me up and I didn't go through the second Lesmo corner very quick so I pulled to the one side and let Jochen past me and then I followed him down into the Parabolica, ... we were going very fast and he waited until about the 200 metres to put on the brakes. The car just sort of went to the right and then it turned to the left and turned out to the right again and then suddenly just went very quickly left into the guardrail.

Upon impact, a joint in the crash barrier parted, the suspension of the vehicle went under the barrier, and the car hit a stanchion head-on. The front end was destroyed. Rindt was in the habit of using only four points on the five-point harness then available and did not wear the crotch straps, as he wanted to be able to exit the car quickly in the event of fire. As a result, upon impact he slid under the belts, and the belts fatally slit open Rindt's throat. Later investigations found that the accident was initiated by a failure of the car's right front inboard brake shaft, but that Rindt's death was caused by poorly installed crash barriers. Chapman rejected the assertion that the broken brake shaft had caused the accident, arguing that the shaft broke when the wheel hit the crash barrier.

Rindt was pronounced dead on the way to hospital in Milan and Lotus withdrew all cars from the race, including the Lotus 72 entered by Rob Walker. The Grand Prix went ahead and Clay Regazzoni took his maiden victory, but celebrations were muted. There was a lengthy investigation into Rindt's death in Italy, leading to a trial against Colin Chapman; he was cleared of all charges in 1976. The destroyed Lotus 72 remained in Italy after the trial, going to a scrapyard near Monza. In 1985, a real estate agent found the wreckage and bought it from the authorities, later trading it in 1993 for a Lola Formula 3 car. Since then, the car has rested in a garage near Milan.

Rindt was the last Austrian Formula One driver to die during qualifying until the 1994 San Marino Grand Prix, which saw the death of Roland Ratzenberger.

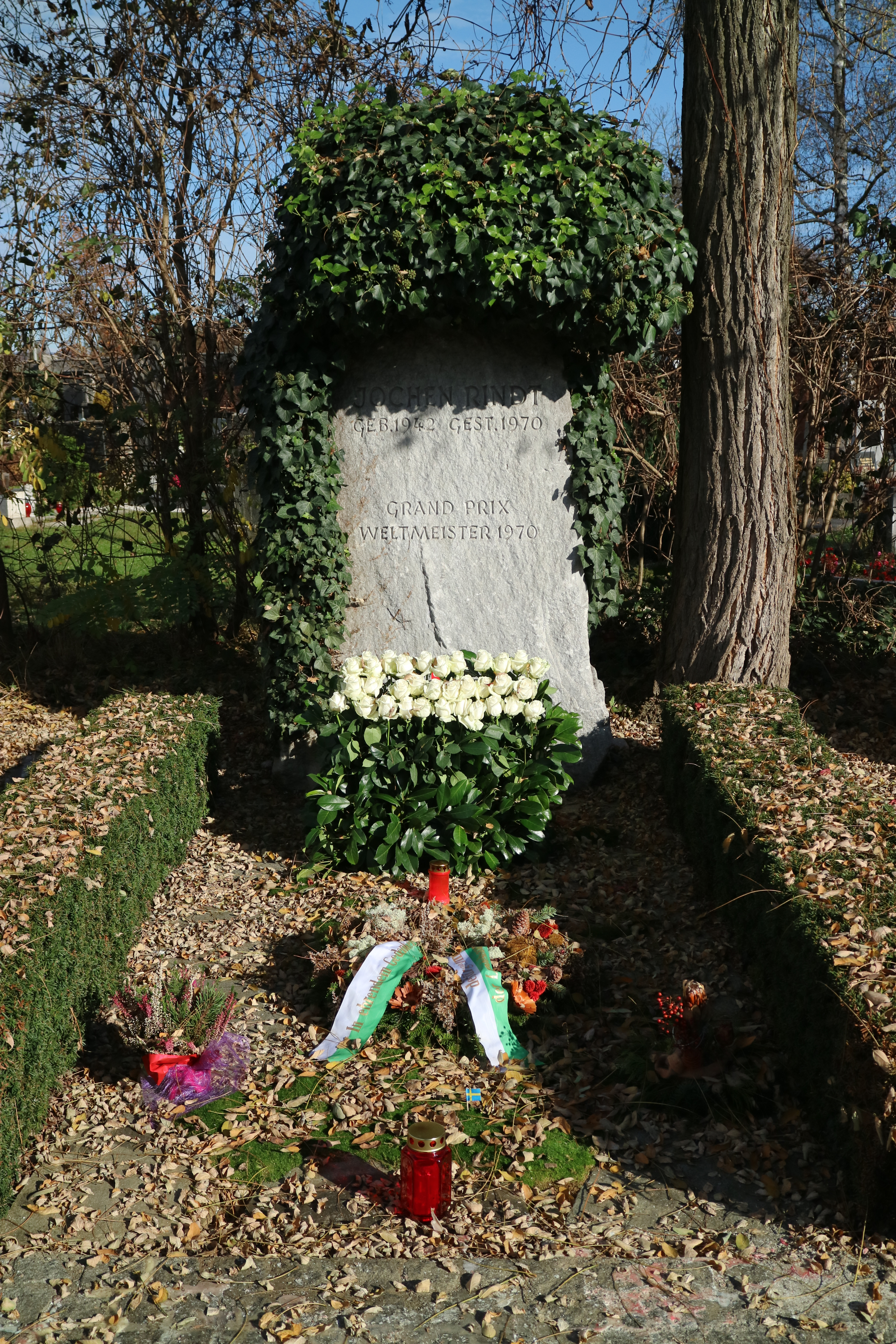
Rindt's grave in Graz

Rindt was buried at the central cemetery (Zentralfriedhof) in Graz on 11 September 1970. At his funeral, Joakim Bonnier gave the eulogy, saying:

To die doing something that you loved to do, is to die happy. And Jochen has the admiration and the respect of all of us. The only way you can admire and respect a great driver and friend. Regardless what happens in the remaining Grands Prix this year, to all of us, Jochen is the world champion.

At the time he died, Rindt had won five of that year's ten Grands Prix, which meant that he had a substantial lead in the Drivers' Championship. After winning the next race in Canada, Jacky Ickx moved within 17 points of Rindt in the Championship, giving him a chance to win the title if he won the two remaining races. At the United States Grand Prix, a race won by Rindt's replacement at Lotus, Emerson Fittipaldi, Ickx placed only fourth, making Rindt motor racing's only posthumous world champion. The championship trophy was handed to his widow Nina by Jackie Stewart on 18 November 1970 in a ceremony near the Place de la Concorde in Paris.

On November 1970, the UEFA Euro 1972 qualifying football matches in Austria held one minute of silence in remembrance of Rindt before the matches.

Rindt was commemorated in many ways. The early season BARC 200 Formula Two race was renamed the Jochen Rindt Memorial Trophy for as long as the series existed. In 2000, on the 30th anniversary of his death, the city of Graz unveiled a bronze plaque in remembrance of Rindt, with wife Nina and daughter Natasha present. The penultimate corner at the Red Bull Ring in Austria is named after Rindt.

The Historic Sports Car Club in the United Kingdom hosts a historic Formula 2 championship, whose pre-1972 category is called the "Class A Jochen Rindt Trophy".

== Personal life ==
In March 1967, Rindt married Nina Lincoln, a Finnish model and daughter of racing driver Curt Lincoln, whom he had raced in the early part of his career. After becoming engaged, Lincoln had originally broken up with Rindt and sent the engagement ring back. Rindt then put it back into the box with a note telling her to keep it until she changed her mind, which she did upon receiving the package, later explaining: "I like men who know what they want." The couple moved to Switzerland, near Begnins, where they built a house together. The Rindts had one daughter, Natasha, who was two years old at the time of her father's death. Nina Rindt married twice more after Rindt's death, first Philip Martyn, with whom she had another daughter, and then Alexander Hood, 4th Viscount Bridport, making her Nina Hood, Lady Bridport. The couple had a son, Anthony. Their daughter Natasha later worked with Bernie Ecclestone for several years after he had taken over the commercial rights of Formula One.

Rindt had met Bernie Ecclestone during his time at Cooper and the two became friends. Noticing his commercial talent, Rindt allowed Ecclestone to manage his professional contracts, without ever officially employing him as a manager. Ecclestone said of the relationship: "I was never his manager, we were good friends. I helped him with any help he ever needed." After Rindt's accident, it was Ecclestone who carried his bloody helmet back to the pit lane.

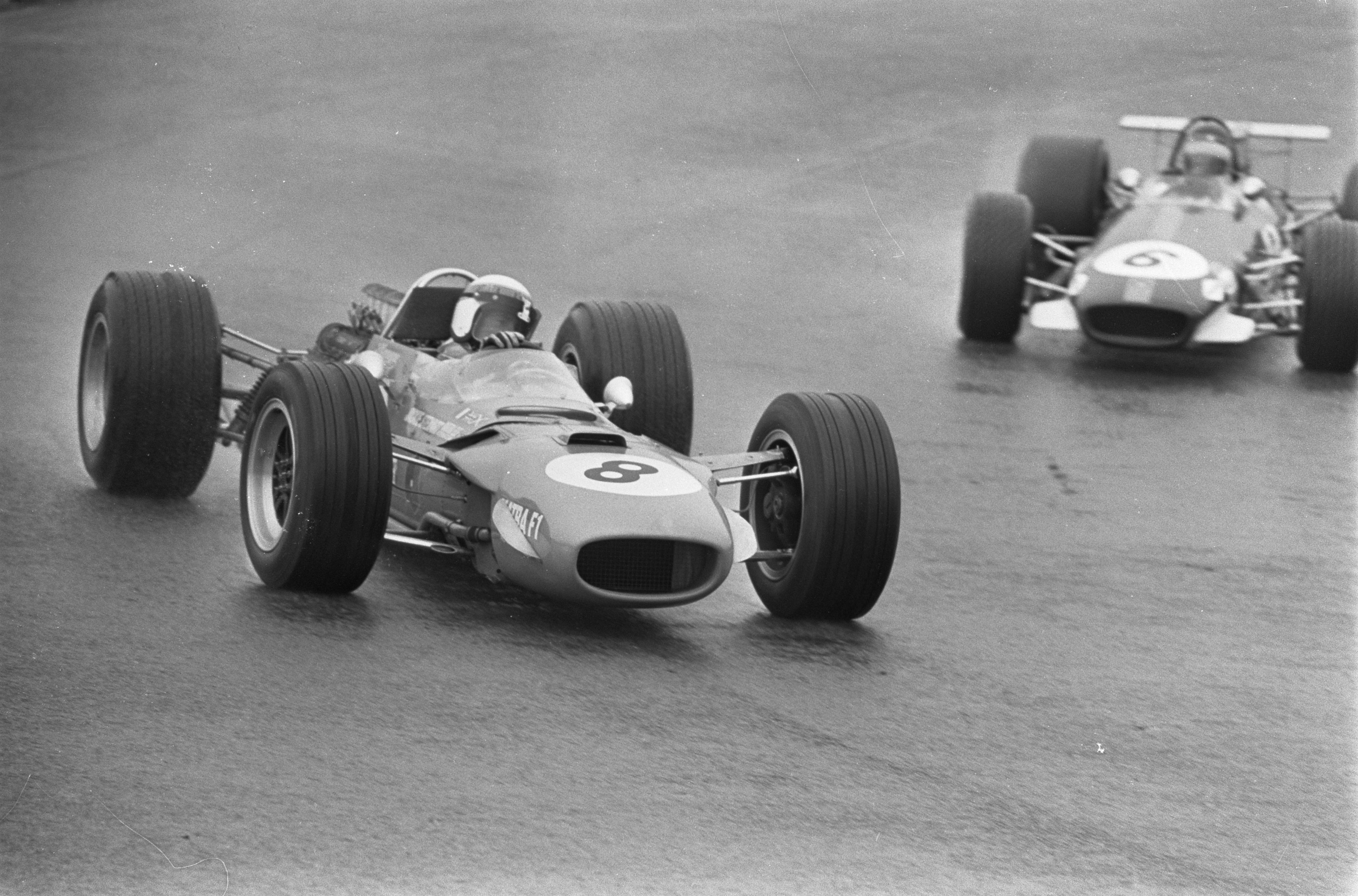
Rindt following Jackie Stewart at the 1968 Dutch Grand Prix

In Formula One, Rindt had several friendly relationships with other drivers, most notably Jackie Stewart. They met at a Formula Two event in 1964 and soon became friends, often going on holiday together and living near each other in Switzerland. Until his death, they were sometimes accompanied by Jim Clark. Rindt became involved in Stewart's fight for increased safety in Formula One, being one of the leading figures of the GPDA. For his role in the safety campaign, Rindt was criticised by fellow drivers and the press alike; reporters derogatively called Stewart, Rindt and Joakim Bonnier the "Geneva connection", due to their residence in Switzerland. Stewart said that it took Rindt some time to understand the graveness of the situation but after that, he was a "good ally". After Rindt's death, his wife Nina stayed close with the Stewarts and can be seen visiting them at the 1971 Monaco Grand Prix in the Roman Polanski-produced film Weekend of a Champion.

Privately, Rindt was known to family and friends as an often reckless driver when on public roads. During the early years of his career, he took his Jaguar E-Type out in the streets of Vienna, where he lived, and drifted through the streets. He sparked public criticism in 1968 when he flipped over a Mini Cooper during a demonstration run at an autocross event in Großhöflein, while his pregnant wife was on board.

Rindt's success popularised motorsport in Austria. Helmut Zwickl called him "the driving instructor of the nation". In 1965, Rindt put together the first exhibition of racing cars in Austria, the Jochen-Rindt-Show in Vienna. It was an immediate success, with 30,000 visitors on the first weekend alone. Using his connections, he brought in his friend Joakim Bonnier and former Mercedes Grand Prix manager Alfred Neubauer as opening speakers, with other drivers such as Jackie Stewart attending. The show soon became an annual event and later moved to the German city of Essen in 1970, shortly after Rindt's death, and remains there as the Essen Motor Show. Rindt, with the help of Ecclestone, was able to successfully promote himself, including lucrative sponsorship and advertising contracts. Following his ascent in racing, two race tracks were built in Austria, the Österreichring (now Red Bull Ring), for which Rindt worked as a consultant, and the Salzburgring. Rindt's popularity was further increased through the TV show Motorama, which he hosted. The monthly programme included tips for driving on public roads, reports from Grands Prix and interviews of fellow drivers by Rindt.

== Racing record ==
=== Career summary ===
Season	Series	Team	Races	Wins	Poles	F/laps	Podiums	Points	Position
1964	Formula One	Rob Walker Racing Team	1	0	0	0	0	0	NC
1964	24 Hours of Le Mans	North American Racing Team	1	0	0	0	0	N/A	DNF
1965	Formula One	Cooper Car Company	9	0	0	0	0	4	13th
1965	Trophées de France	Roy Winkelmann Racing	4	1	1	1	3	16	**2nd**
1965	24 Hours of Le Mans	North American Racing Team	1	1	0	0	1	N/A	**1st**
1966	Formula One	Cooper Car Company	9	0	0	0	3	22	**3rd**
1966	24 Hours of Le Mans	F.R. English Ltd. \ Comstock Racing	1	0	0	0	0	N/A	DNF
1967	Formula One	Cooper Car Company	10	0	0	0	0	6	13th
1967	Trophées de France	Roy Winkelmann Racing	4	3	1	1	4	33	**1st**
1967	RAC British F2 Championship	Roy Winkelmann Racing	5	3	0	0	0	27	**1st**
1967	24 Hours of Le Mans	Porsche System Engineering	1	0	0	0	0	N/A	DNF
1967	USAC Championship Car	Wagner Lockheed Brake Fluid	1	0	0	0	0	0	NC
1968	Formula One	Brabham Racing Organisation	12	0	2	0	2	8	12th
1968	USAC Championship Car	Repco-Brabham	1	0	0	0	0	0	NC
1969	Formula One	Gold Leaf Team Lotus	10	1	5	2	3	22	4th
1969	Tasman Series	Gold Leaf Team Lotus	7	2	0	0	4	30	**2nd**
1970	Formula One	Gold Leaf Team Lotus	9	5	3	1	5	45	**1st**

=== Complete Formula One World Championship results ===
(key) (Races in bold indicate pole position; races in italics indicate fastest lap)

Year	Entrant	Chassis	Engine	1	2	3	4	5	6	7	8	9	10	11	12	13	WDC	Pts
1964	Rob Walker Racing Team	Brabham BT11	BRM P56 1.5 V8	MON	NED	BEL	FRA	GBR	GER	AUT; Ret	ITA	USA	MEX				NC	0
1965	Cooper Car Company	Cooper T73	Climax FWMV 1.5 V8	RSA; Ret							ITA; 8						13th	4
1965	Cooper Car Company	Cooper T77	Climax FWMV 1.5 V8		MON; DNQ	BEL; 11	FRA; Ret	GBR; 14	NED; Ret	GER; 4		USA; 6	MEX; Ret				13th	4
1966	Cooper Car Company	Cooper T81	Maserati 9/F1 3.0 V12	MON; Ret	BEL; 2	FRA; 4	GBR; 5	NED; Ret	GER; 3	ITA; 4	USA; 2	MEX; Ret					**3rd**	**22 (24)**
1967	Cooper Car Company	Cooper T81	Maserati 9/F1 3.0 V12	RSA; Ret	MON; Ret						CAN; Ret						13th	6
1967	Cooper Car Company	Cooper T81B	Maserati 9/F1 3.0 V12			NED; Ret											13th	6
1967	Cooper Car Company	Cooper T81B	Maserati 10/F1 3.0 V12				BEL; 4	FRA; Ret					USA; Ret	MEX			13th	6
1967	Cooper Car Company	Cooper T86	Maserati 10/F1 3.0 V12						GBR; Ret	GER; Ret		ITA; 4					13th	6
1968	Brabham Racing Organisation	Brabham BT24	Repco 740 3.0 V8	RSA; 3	ESP; Ret	MON; Ret											12th	8
1968	Brabham Racing Organisation	Brabham BT26	Repco 860 3.0 V8				BEL; Ret	NED; Ret	**FRA**; Ret	GBR; Ret	GER; 3	ITA; Ret	**CAN**; Ret	USA; Ret	MEX; Ret		12th	8
1969	Gold Leaf Team Lotus	Lotus 49B	Ford Cosworth DFV 3.0 V8	RSA; Ret	**ESP**; Ret	MON	**NED**; Ret	FRA; Ret	**GBR**; 4	GER; Ret	**ITA**; 2	CAN; 3	**USA**; 1	MEX; Ret			4th	22
1970	Gold Leaf Team Lotus	Lotus 49C	Ford Cosworth DFV 3.0 V8	RSA; 13		MON; 1	BEL; Ret										**1st**	**45**
1970	Gold Leaf Team Lotus	Lotus 72	Ford Cosworth DFV 3.0 V8		ESP; Ret												**1st**	**45**
1970	Gold Leaf Team Lotus	Lotus 72C	Ford Cosworth DFV 3.0 V8					**NED**; 1	FRA; 1	**GBR**; 1	GER; 1	**AUT**; Ret	ITA; DNS	CAN	USA	MEX	**1st**	**45**

=== Non-championship Formula One results ===
(key) (Races in bold indicate pole position) (Races in italics indicate fastest lap)

Year	Entrant	Chassis	Engine	1	2	3	4	5	6	7	8	9	10	11	12	13	14
1963	Jochen Rindt	Cooper T67	Ford 109E 1.5 L4	LOM	GLV	PAU	IMO	SYR	AIN	INT	ROM	SOL	KAN	MED	AUT; Ret	OUL	RAN
1965	Cooper Car Company	Cooper T77	Climax FWMV 1.5 V8	ROC; 7	SYR	SMT; DSQ	INT; Ret										
1965	Roy Winkelmann Racing	Brabham BT16 (F2)	Ford Cosworth FVA 1.6 L4					MED; Ret	RAN								
1966	Cooper Car Company	Cooper T81	Maserati 9/F1 3.0 V12	RSA	SYR	INT; 5	OUL										
1967	Cooper Car Company	Cooper T81	Maserati 9/F1 3.0 V12	ROC; Ret	SPR	INT	SYR										
1967	Roy Winkelmann Racing	Brabham BT23 (F2)	Ford Cosworth FVA 1.6 L4					OUL; 6	ESP								
1968	Brabham Racing Organisation	Brabham BT26	Repco 860 3.0 V8	ROC	INT	OUL; Ret											
1969	Gold Leaf Team Lotus	Lotus 49B	Ford Cosworth DFV 3.0 V8	ROC; Ret	INT; 2	MAD											
1969	Gold Leaf Team Lotus	Lotus 63	Ford Cosworth DFV 3.0 V8				OUL; 2										
1970	Gold Leaf Team Lotus	Lotus 49C	Ford Cosworth DFV 3.0 V8	ROC; 2													
1970	Gold Leaf Team Lotus	Lotus 72	Ford Cosworth DFV 3.0 V8		INT; Ret	OUL; 2											

=== Tasman Series results ===
(key)

Year	Team	Chassis	Engine	1	2	3	4	5	6	7	Rank	Pts
1969	Gold Leaf Team Lotus	Lotus 49T	Cosworth DFW 2.5 V8	PUK; 2	LEV; Ret						2nd	30
1969	Gold Leaf Team Lotus	Lotus 49BT	Cosworth DFW 2.5 V8			WIG; 1	TER; Ret	LAK; Ret	WAR; 1	SAN; 2	2nd	30

=== Complete 24 Hours of Le Mans results ===
Year	Team	Co-drivers	Car	Class	Laps	Pos.	Class pos.
1964	(United States) North American Racing Team	(United Kingdom) David Piper	Ferrari 250LM	P 5.0	0	DNF	DNF
1965	(United States) North American Racing Team	(United States) Masten Gregory	Ferrari 250LM	P 5.0	348	**1st**	**1st**
1966	(United Kingdom) F.R. English Ltd. \ Comstock Racing	(United Kingdom) Innes Ireland	Ford GT40 Mk I	S 5.0	8	DNF	DNF
1967	(Germany) Porsche System Engineering	(Germany) Gerhard Mitter	Porsche 907	P 2.0	103	DNF	DNF

=== Complete Indianapolis 500 results ===
Year	Chassis	Engine	Start	Finish
1967	Eagle	Ford	32nd	24th
1968	Brabham	Repco	16th	32nd

== Notes ==
Sporting positions
Preceded by Jean Guichet; Nino Vaccarella	Winner of the 24 Hours of Le Mans; 1965; With: Masten Gregory	Succeeded by Bruce McLaren; Chris Amon
Preceded by Jackie Stewart	Formula One World Champion; 1970	Succeeded by Jackie Stewart
Preceded by Piers Courage	Formula One fatal accidents 5 September 1970	Succeeded by Jo Siffert
