= Krieglach =

- Municipality
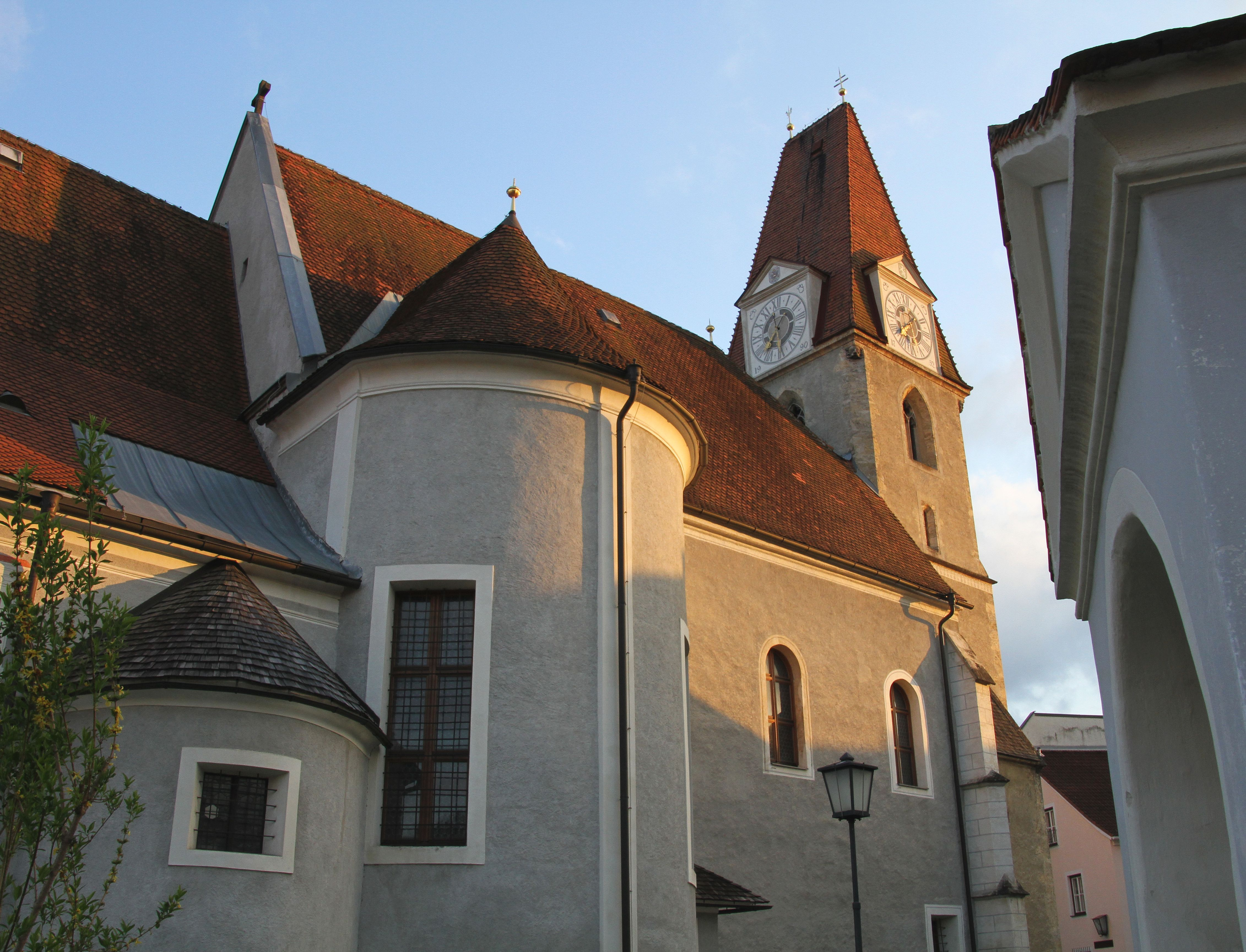
- Krieglach parish church

- Coat of arms

- Location within Austria
- Coordinates: 47°32′44″N 15°33′34″E
- Country: Austria
- State: Styria
- District: Bruck-Mürzzuschlag

Government
  - Mayor: Regina Schrittwieser (NL)

Area
  - Total: 93.79 km^{2} (36.21 sq mi)
- Elevation: 612 m (2,008 ft)

Population (2018-01-01)
  - Total: 5,305
  - Density: 56.56/km^{2} (146.5/sq mi)
- Time zone: UTC+1 (CET)
  - Summer (DST): UTC+2 (CEST)
- Postal code: 8670
- Area code: 03855
- Vehicle registration: BM
- Website: www.krieglach.at

Krieglach is a municipality in the district of Bruck-Mürzzuschlag in Styria, Austria.

It is the hometown of the renowned poet and writer Peter Rosegger.
