= Formula One drivers from Austria =

List of Formula One drivers who competed as Austrian

- Drivers: 15
- Grands Prix: 562
- Entries: 694
- Starts: 664
- Best season finish: 1st (1970, 1975, 1977, 1984)
- Wins: 41
- Podiums: 118
- Pole positions: 46
- Fastest laps: 49
- Points: 990.5
- First entry: 1964 Austrian Grand Prix (Jochen Rindt)
- First win: 1969 United States Grand Prix (Jochen Rindt)
- Latest win: 1997 German Grand Prix (Gerhard Berger)
- Latest entry: 2010 Abu Dhabi Grand Prix (Christian Klien)
- 2026 drivers: None

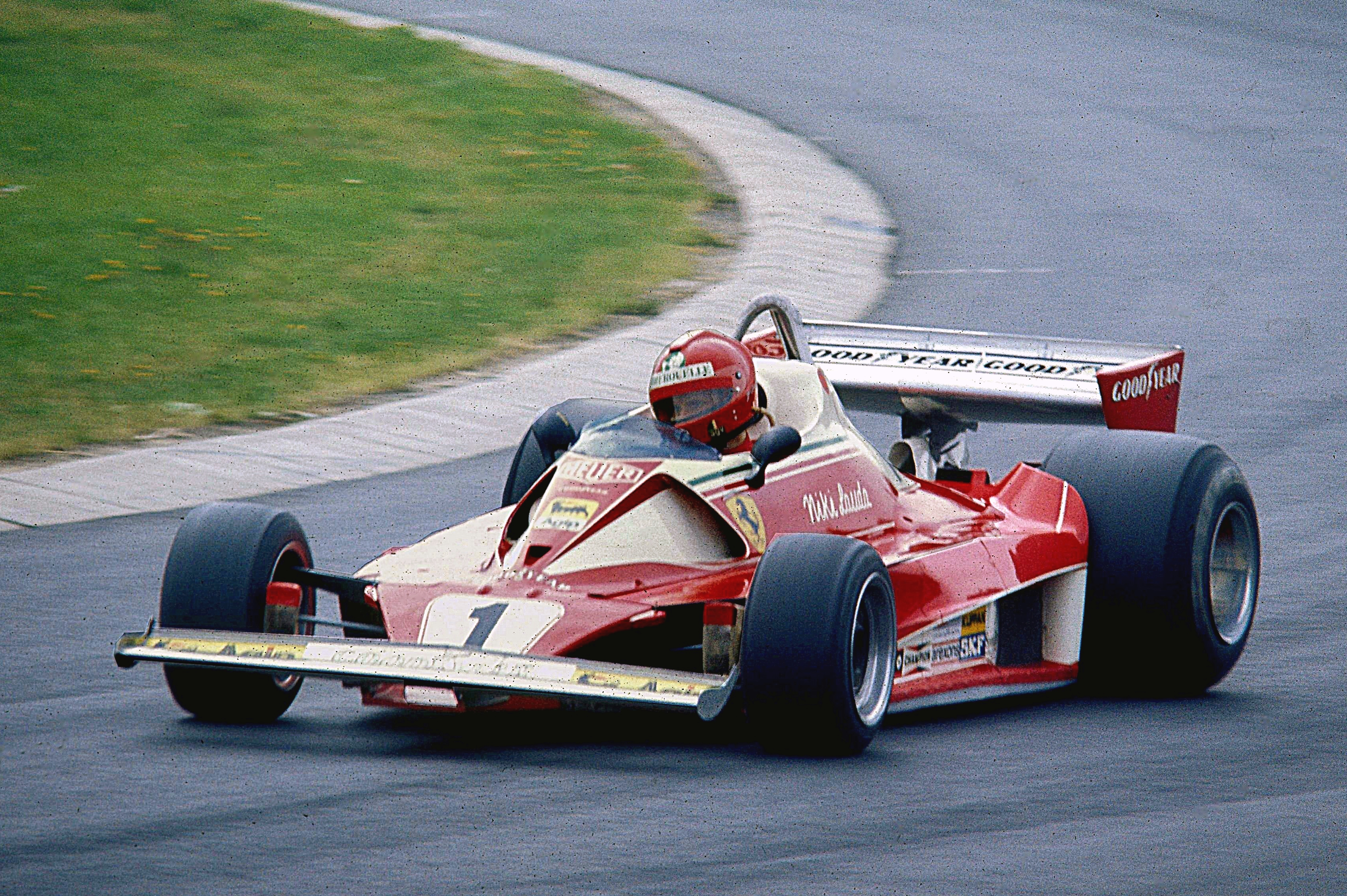
Niki Lauda, the most successful Austrian Formula One driver, in the Ferrari 312 T2 in 1976

There have been fifteen Formula One drivers from Austria including two winners of the World Drivers' Championship. Three Austrian drivers have been killed while competing in the sport; only the United Kingdom has lost more racers' lives in the sport. Several others were seriously injured in competition, with some having career ending accidents.

== World champions and race winners ==
Two Austrian drivers won the World Drivers' Championship. Niki Lauda won for Ferrari in 1975 and 1977, coming second in the season in between. He won again with McLaren in 1984 by just half a point from team mate Alain Prost. Jochen Rindt, won the title in 1970, and is the only posthumous championship winner having died in a crash during a practice session for the Italian Grand Prix.

Gerhard Berger is the only other Austrian driver to win a race in Formula One. He achieved ten victories in 210 races. He started more Grands Prix than any other Austrian driver and is one of a small number of Formula One racers to compete in more than 200 events.

== Former drivers ==
=== Notable former drivers ===
Niki Lauda took out bank loans secured by his life insurance policy to pay for his first Formula One race seat with March in 1971. He secured a drive with BRM for 1973 but his debts continued to grow. Team mate Clay Regazzoni moved to Ferrari for the next season and convinced Enzo Ferrari to buy Lauda out of his contract with BRM. His career took off and he was victorious twice in 1974 on his way to fourth in the drivers' championship. Five wins in 1975 helped him to claim his first drivers' title, and he looked likely to retain it the following year until a near-fatal crash at Nürburgring sidelined him. Despite first-degree burns to his head and hands, the loss of half an ear, and several broken bones, Lauda returned after just six weeks and missed only two races. Jackie Stewart described it as the most courageous comeback in the history of sport. In 1977, Lauda finished on the podium in 10 of the 14 races he started, winning the title for a second time. He left Ferrari for Brabham and won two races in 1978, but only finished seven of the 16 races. The next year proved to be a particular low point and Lauda only managed to finish two races, leading to his retirement from the sport. His absence was only short-lived however and he returned as a driver for McLaren in 1982. He raced with the team for four years, winning five races and a third drivers' title in 1984 before retiring again – and this time permanently – at the end of 1985.

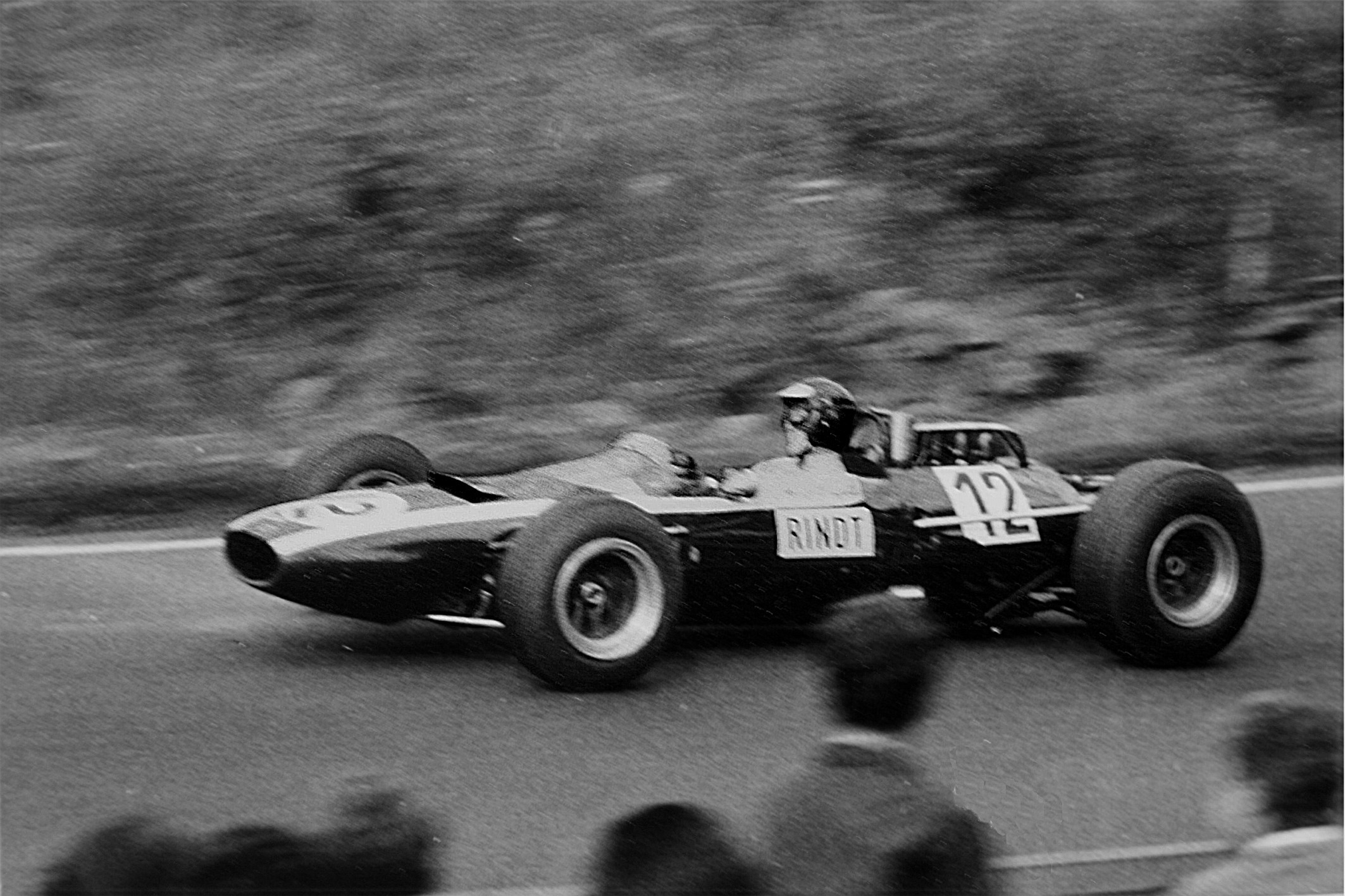
Jochen Rindt in the 1965 Cooper-Climax

Jochen Rindt was born in Germany during World War II. His parents were killed in a bombing raid and he was taken by his grandparents to live in Austria. His Formula One breakthrough came with a one-off drive for Brabham at the 1964 Austrian Grand Prix. He impressed enough to secure a seat with Cooper for the 1965 season and though the car was uncompetitive he managed to secure three podium finishes in 1966. He joined Brabham in 1968 but fared worse when the unreliable car only finished two of twelve races. Abandoning the team for Lotus, Rindt won his first race in 1969, and dominated in 1970 when he was given the Lotus 72, winning four races consecutively. That year, two friends of Rindt, Bruce McLaren and Piers Courage, died while testing and racing respectively. He told his wife that he would retire from the sport if he became world champion, though he never managed to fulfil his promise. While taking part in a practice session for the 1970 Italian Grand Prix, the front right brakeshaft on Rindt's car failed, sending him into the barriers and killing him. Lotus withdrew from the race and brought in Emerson Fittipaldi to fill the vacant seat at the final grand prix in the United States. Fittipaldi won the race, helping to maintain Rindt's lead in the championship. Rindt was crowned as the only posthumous world champion in the history of Formula One.

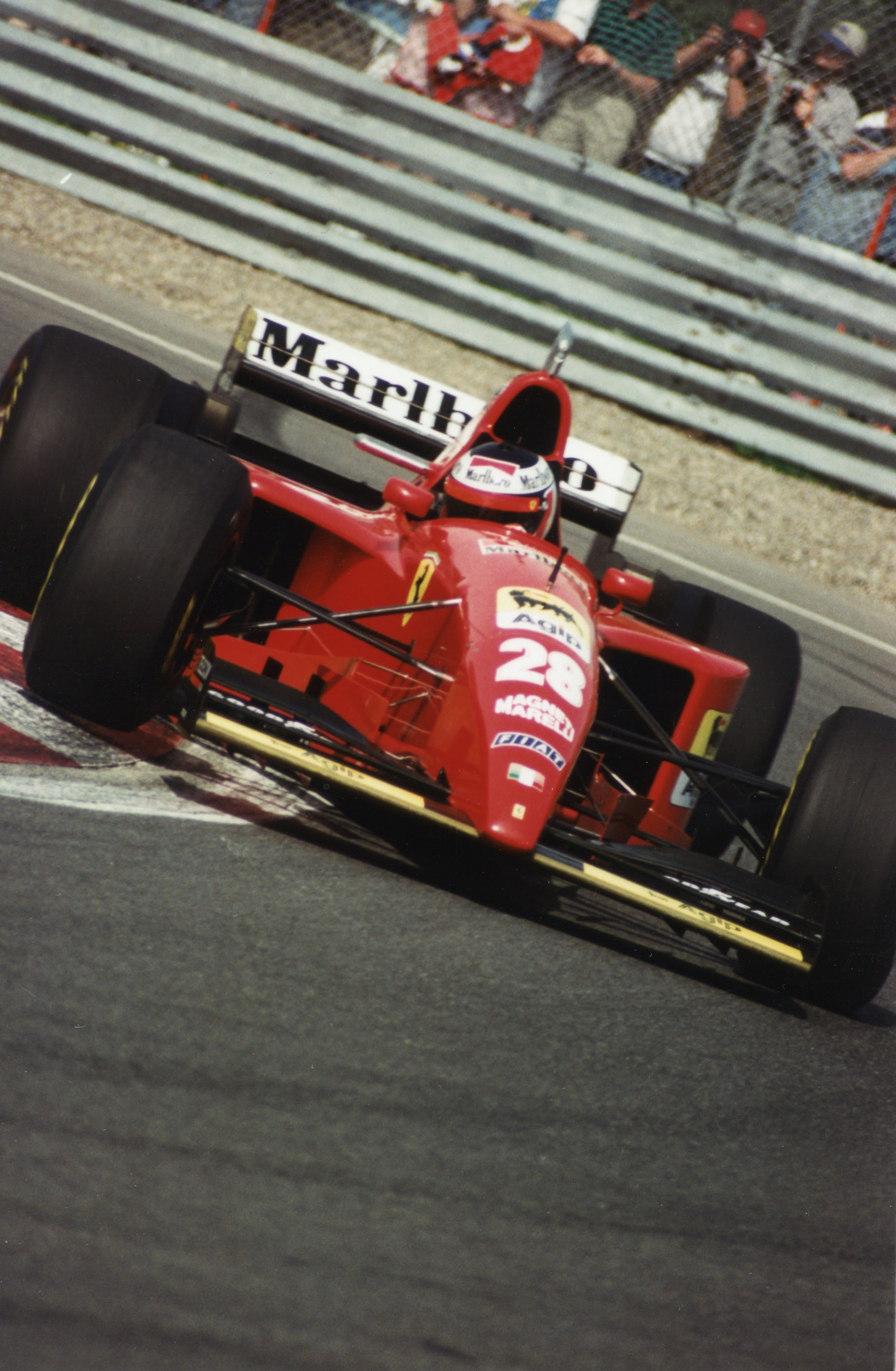
Gerhard Berger driving a Ferrari in 1995

Gerhard Berger competed in Formula One between 1984 and 1997, driving for several teams including McLaren and Ferrari. He started with ATS before securing a full-time drive with Arrows for the 1985 season. He had looked unlikely to compete that year after breaking his neck in a road accident, but finished the season with three points. In 1986, he drove for Benetton and won his first race in Mexico. Berger's first stint with Ferrari began in 1987, winning four races over the next three years. 1989 proved to be a terrible year with only three finishes from 15 and so Berger moved to McLaren to partner Ayrton Senna. During his three years with the team, he secured 18 podiums including three wins. He rejoined Ferrari in 1993 but found their performance to be relatively poor, finishing with only one podium. He managed to win one race in 1994 and finished third in the drivers' championship. Berger then spent two more years with Benetton, winning at the 1997 German Grand Prix before retiring as a driver. He went on to become a team manager with BMW and later Toro Rosso.

Berger's career was promoted by Helmut Marko, a fellow Austrian who had himself raced in Formula One. Marko started a total of nine grands prix with McLaren and BRM with a best result of sixth. His racing career was ended at the 1972 French Grand Prix when a stone was launched from the wheel of a car he was following, piercing his visor and blinding him in one eye. He later became an advisor to the Red Bull F1 team led by Austrian Dietrich Mateschitz.

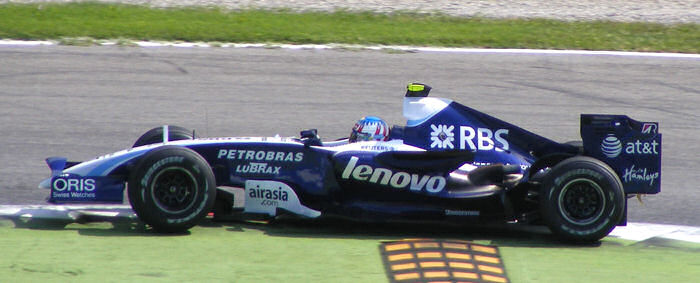
Wurz driving for Williams at the 2007 Italian Grand Prix

Alexander Wurz is the fourth and most recent podium scorer, having achieved a third place in 2007. He signed as a test driver for Benetton in 1997 and stood in for an ill Gerhard Berger for three races. When both Berger and Alesi left at the end of the year, Wurz was given a full racing seat, remaining with the team until he was dropped at the end of the 2000 season. He moved to McLaren, once again being a test driver and later their stand-in. Main driver Juan Pablo Montoya was injured playing tennis in 2005 and was temporarily replaced first by Pedro de la Rosa and then by Wurz for one race each. Wurz finished fourth but was later promoted to third after the exclusion of the BAR racers. At the end of the year he moved to take up the same role with Williams before being promoted to a main driver in 2007. He was outclassed by team mate Nico Rosberg, securing one podium and a total of 13 points, retiring before the last race of the season.

Roland Ratzenberger started in Formula One with Simtek in 1994. He was qualifying for the third race of the season at Imola when a front wing failure caused by a previous off-track excursion threw him off the circuit at over 300 kmh. He hit the wall with such an impact that his neck was broken. His death was overshadow by Ayrton Senna's fatal accident the following day, however when the Brazilian's overalls were removed an Austrian flag was found tucked in his sleeve. It is speculated that he would have waved the flag in tribute to Ratzenberger at the end of the race.

Karl Wendlinger was fortunate not to lose his life at the following race. Driving for Sauber in a practice session for the 1994 Monaco Grand Prix, Wendlinger lost control coming out of the tunnel and crashed heavily into the barrier. He was in a medically induced coma for two weeks and needed months of rehabilitation. He returned to the team in 1995 but was dropped when it was felt that he could no longer perform as well as had been hoped.

Helmut Koinigg was only driving in his second Formula One race when he crashed and died during the 1974 United States Grand Prix. The suspension on his Surtees failed and pitched him into the Armco. Though the collision speed was relatively low, the poorly installed barrier buckled and decapitated Koinigg, instantly killing him.

Christian Klien, the most recent Austrian F1 driver

Christian Klien is the most recent competitor having taken part in the 2010 season as a driver with HRT, driving in three races while Sakon Yamamoto was ill. Klien had raced with Jaguar in 2004, staying with the team when they were bought by Red Bull until he was dropped just before the end of the 2006 season.

=== Other former drivers ===
The following Austrian drivers were entered for at least one Formula One race:

- Harald Ertl, who started 19 races across five seasons with Hesketh, Ensign, and ATS. His Formula One career began in 1975 and his best finish was 7th in 1976. He did not race in 1979 and failed to start the one race he entered in 1980.
- Hans Binder, who started 13 races between 1976 and 1978.
- Patrick Friesacher, who raced with Minardi in 2005 until being dropped after eleven races.
- Jo Gartner, who drove in eight races in 1984 for Osella. He was killed in a crash at Le Mans in 1986.
- Dieter Quester, whose only race was the 1974 Austrian Grand Prix.
- Otto Stuppacher, who did not start any of the three races he was entered for in 1976.

Karl Oppitzhauser attempted to enter the 1976 Austrian Grand Prix but was refused entry due to his lack of experience.

== Statistics ==
Drivers	Active Years	Entries	Wins	Podiums	Career Points	Poles	Fastest Laps	Championships
Jochen Rindt	1964–1970	62 (60 starts)	6	13	107 (109)	10	3	1 (1970)
Dieter Quester	1969, 1974	2 (1 start)	0	0	0	0	0	-
Helmut Marko	1971–1972	10 (9 starts)	0	0	0	0	0	-
Niki Lauda	1971–1979, 1982–1985	177 (171 starts)	25	54	420.5	24	24	3 (1975, 1977, 1984)
Helmut Koinigg	1974	3 (2 starts)	0	0	0	0	0	-
Harald Ertl	1975–1978, 1980	28 (19 starts)	0	0	0	0	0	-
Otto Stuppacher	1976	3 (0 starts)	0	0	0	0	0	-
Hans Binder	1976–1978	15 (13 starts)	0	0	0	0	0	-
Jo Gartner	1984	8	0	0	0	0	0	-
Gerhard Berger	1984–1997	210	10	48	385	12	21	-
Karl Wendlinger	1991–1995	42 (41 starts)	0	0	14	0	0	-
Roland Ratzenberger	1994	3 (1 start)	0	0	0	0	0	-
Alexander Wurz	1997–2000, 2005, 2007	69	0	3	45	0	1	-
Christian Klien	2004–2006, 2010	51 (49 starts)	0	0	14	0	0	-
Patrick Friesacher	2005	11	0	0	3	0	0	-

== See also ==
- List of Formula One Grand Prix winners
