= Graz Reininghaus =

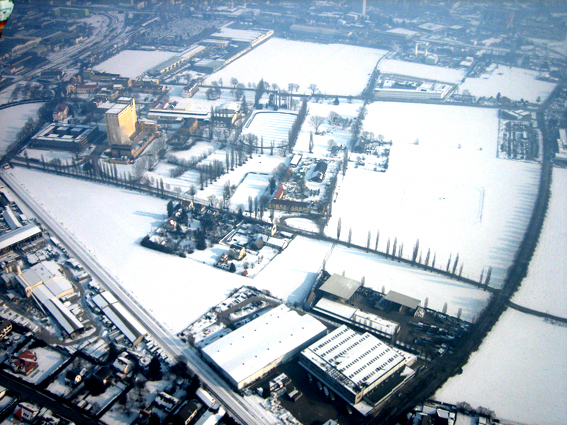
Reininghaus, Graz

The grounds of the former Reininghaus brewery, covering 50 hectares, represent the largest undeveloped area near the center of Graz, Austria’s second largest city. They are southwest of the main train station in the district called Eggenberg, 2 kilometers away from Graz’s well-known clocktower. The area includes fields, ponds and in part landmarked industrial architecture from the former brewery. The historically rare basement vaults cover 1.5 hectares and were made to store beer in spaces up to 8 meters high.

== Contents ==
=== History ===
In 1669, a brewery was built for the first time next to the largest duty building in Graz in the area of the stone field. In 1855, the Westphalian Johann Peter Reininghaus together with his brother Julius founded the company “Brüder Reininghaus” and built the first steam-run brewery in Styria. Around 1900, the brewery was the fifth largest in Austria. The brewery’s area of business spread out far beyond Austria to Greece, Egypt, East India, Zanzibar and South America.

When the Second World War broke out, the Reininghaus family was forced to emigrate. After their return from exile, they transferred the beer production to Puntigam. In spite of having moved production, the family held onto the mostly fallow fields. Peter Reininghaus Sr.’s death in 1973 signaled the beginning of a period of 25 years in which many projects were conceived, but none were actually completed.

=== Neighborhood ===
On the property itself one finds a building housing research-oriented companies, a day-care center specializing in integration and an allotment garden facility. The Fachhochschule Joanneum and the flagship operation of the Styrian human technology cluster Roche Diagnostics border on the area.

=== Location ===
Geographical Coordinates 47°3′52.84″N 15°24′31.89″E

=== Sources ===
- de:Reininghaus (Graz)
