= Four-wheel drive in Formula One =

Four-wheel drive (4WD) has only been tried a handful of times in Formula One. In the World Championship era since 1950, only eight such cars are known to have been built.

== Ferguson P99 (1961) ==
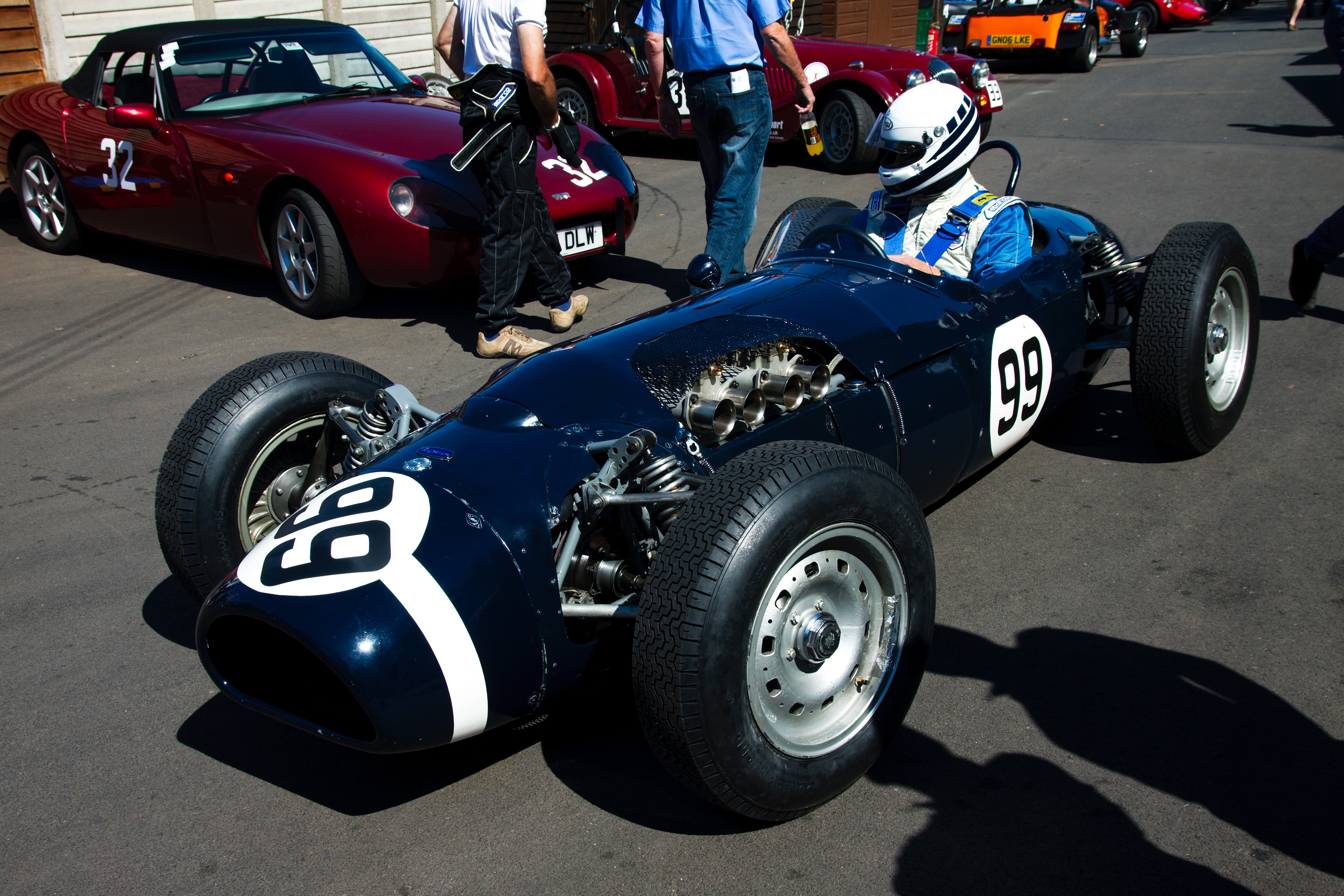
The Ferguson P99

The first 4WD F1 car was the Ferguson P99-Climax, and it remains the most famous example as a result of its twin claims to fame – not only the first 4WD car, but also the last front-engined car ever to win a Formula 1 event.

Fred Dixon and Tony Rolt considered the possibility of using 4WD in circuit racing, and with Harry Ferguson keen to promote the transmission systems of his Ferguson tractor firm work began on the P99 in 1960. With a 50–50 torque distribution front to rear the car, Claude Hill's design was built to have an even weight distribution over both axles, which along with the position of the gearbox necessitated a front-engined design despite Cooper's and Lotus's overwhelming recent success with mid-engined cars. Just as the project was nearing completion it was dealt something of a body blow by the governing body's decision to reduce the size of F1 engines by 40% for 1961, making the extra weight of the 4WD transmission a much bigger penalty. Nevertheless the team persevered and fitted a standard 1.5-litre Climax 4-cylinder engine, mounted at a slant to make room for the front driveshaft. In addition the driving position was moved slightly off-centre to accommodate the gearbox and rear driveshaft to the driver's left hand side.

The car was first raced in the 1961 British Empire Trophy, where Rob Walker put Jack Fairman in the car, but the start was an inauspicious one as Fairman crashed on lap 2. In the British Grand Prix at Aintree, Fairman drove the car again, but surrendered it to Stirling Moss after his Walker-entered Lotus 18 failed. The car was disqualified for outside assistance on lap 56. The car's last major F1 race was its moment of motor racing immortality, as Moss drove the P99 to victory in a damp International Gold Cup at Oulton Park. In February 1963, the car, having been fitted with a 2.5-litre Climax engine, was driven by Graham Hill in the Australian Grand Prix at Warwick Farm and the Lakeside International at Lakeside, placing sixth and second respectively. The P99's final racing action came in the British Hillclimb championship in 1964, 1965 and 1966, with Peter Westbury winning the title in 1964.

The P99 was later used as the basis for the 4WD Ferguson P104 Novi indycar, which Bobby Unser drove in the Indy 500 in 1964 and 1965, retiring on both occasions.

In a 1997 interview for Motor Sport magazine, Sir Stirling Moss nominated the P99 as his favourite of all the F1 cars he drove. This was considered high praise from a man who drove the Mercedes W196, Maserati 250F, Vanwall and Cooper T51.

== BRM P67 (1964) ==
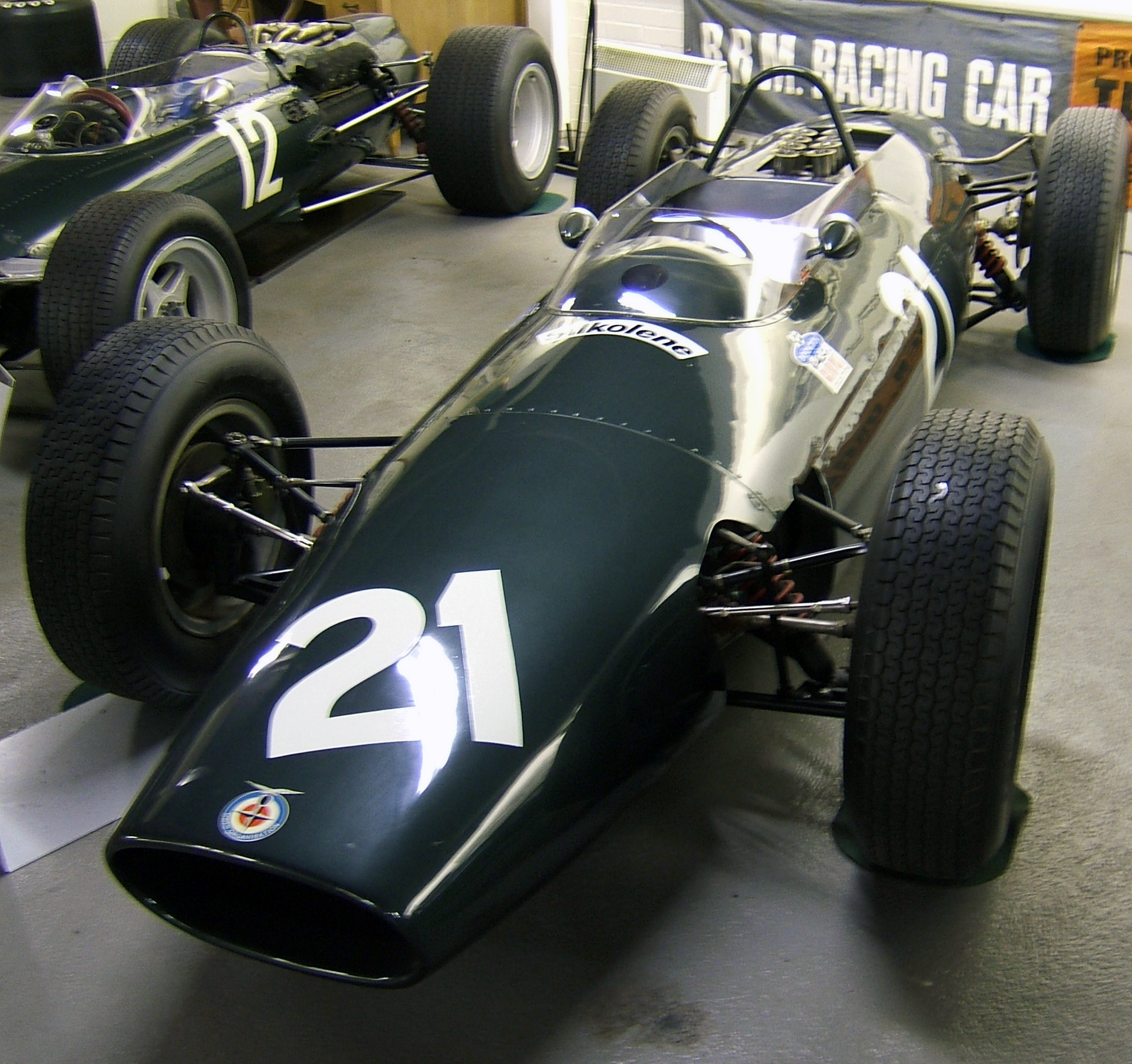
The BRM P67 in the Donington Grand Prix Collection. Note the slender half shafts to the front wheels.

After Ferguson withdrew from racing they offered their 4WD technology to any F1 manufacturer who was interested, and with the approaching switch to 3.0-litre engines in 1966 in mind BRM decided to try it out. The resulting car consisted of the chassis of a BRM P261, the suspension of a P57, a 1.5-litre BRM P56 engine mounted back-to-front and Ferguson's transmission system, all put together by BRM apprentice Mike Pilbeam who was later to find fame as a constructor of hillclimb cars.

The P67 was entered for the 1964 British Grand Prix with Richard Attwood driving, but after qualifying last BRM withdrew the car from the race. Thereafter BRM put their 4WD programme in mothballs, to concentrate on their complicated H16 engine, although this engine was built with room for a second driveshaft to pass through the engine should 4WD become the way to go.

It was apt, given its designer, that the P67 itself was later used extensively in hillclimbs, as the Ferguson P99 had been before it, being driven by David Good in 1967 with a bigger 2-litre engine. After some tuning to the Ferguson transmission's torque distribution it proved extremely successful in this field, Peter Lawson winning the British championship with ease in 1968.

== Boom in 1969 ==
With the introduction of the Cosworth DFV in 1967, F1 constructors found the exceptional power-to-weight ratio of the new engine gave them much more power than the grip levels of their cars could deal with, particularly in wet conditions. As a result several solutions were tried, with three leading Cosworth customers and even Cosworth themselves each trying their hand at building 4WD F1 cars.

Ironically, while the 1968 season was plagued by wet races, there was hardly a raindrop to be seen in 1969, so the 4WD cars never got to fully demonstrate their abilities. Meanwhile, advances in wing and tyre technologies negated any advantage to compensate for the extra weight and complication of their 4WD transmission systems compared to their rear-wheel drive contemporaries. Furthermore, virtually every driver who drove the cars hated the way they handled.

=== Lotus 63 ===
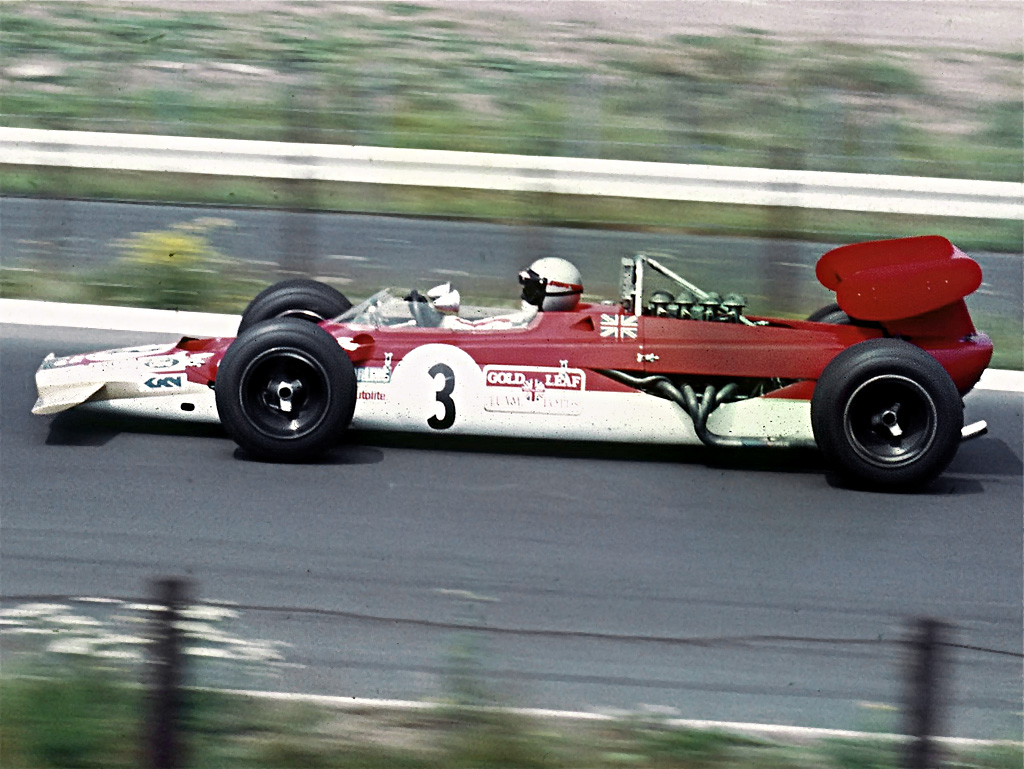
Lotus 63 4WD driven by Mario Andretti at the Nürburgring

Of the four 4WD projects, the Lotus team were undoubtedly the most committed. The design of the car was influenced by the all-conquering Lotus 49 and the two 4WD gas turbine cars Lotus had entered in the Indy 500, and as well as its wedge shape the later Lotus 72 would also inherit its inboard front brakes. As with the Matra and McLaren cars, the 63 featured a back-to-front DFV with a bespoke Hewland gearbox and a Ferguson 4WD transmission with provision to adjust the front-rear torque distribution between 50–50 and 30–70.

With a ban on high-mounted wings following Graham Hill and Jochen Rindt's accidents in the 1969 Spanish Grand Prix meaning low grip was more of a problem than ever the 63s were pressed into service two races later at Zandvoort. Hill tried the car in the first qualifying session, but after going nearly four seconds quicker in his regular 49B, and declaring the 63 a "death trap", it was left to Lotus test driver John Miles to give the car its debut at the French GP, retiring after a single lap with a fuel pump failure. At the British Grand Prix both chassis were available, but after Hill again tried the car in practice, and again refused to drive it, Jo Bonnier drove the car with Hill in Bonnier's 49B, while Miles again drove the other 63. Bonnier retired with an engine problem while Miles finished tenth, some nine laps down.

Mario Andretti drove in place of Miles in the next race at the Nürburgring, but crashed heavily on the first lap, badly damaging the chassis. At the International Gold Cup Jochen Rindt was forced to drive the 63, despite protesting furiously to Chapman, and in an under-strength field of F1 and F5000 cars came second, some way behind Jacky Ickx's Brabham. In the remaining races of the season Miles drove the car in the Italian, Canadian and Mexican races, retiring from all three with engine, gearbox and fuel pump failures, with Andretti retiring at Watkins Glen with broken suspension. After losing both championships to Jackie Stewart's Matra, Chapman finally decided that it was time to abandon the 4WD car and concentrate on the designs for the Lotus 72.

One 63 chassis is currently on display as part of the Donington Grand Prix Collection, the other is believed to be in Australia.

=== Matra MS84 ===
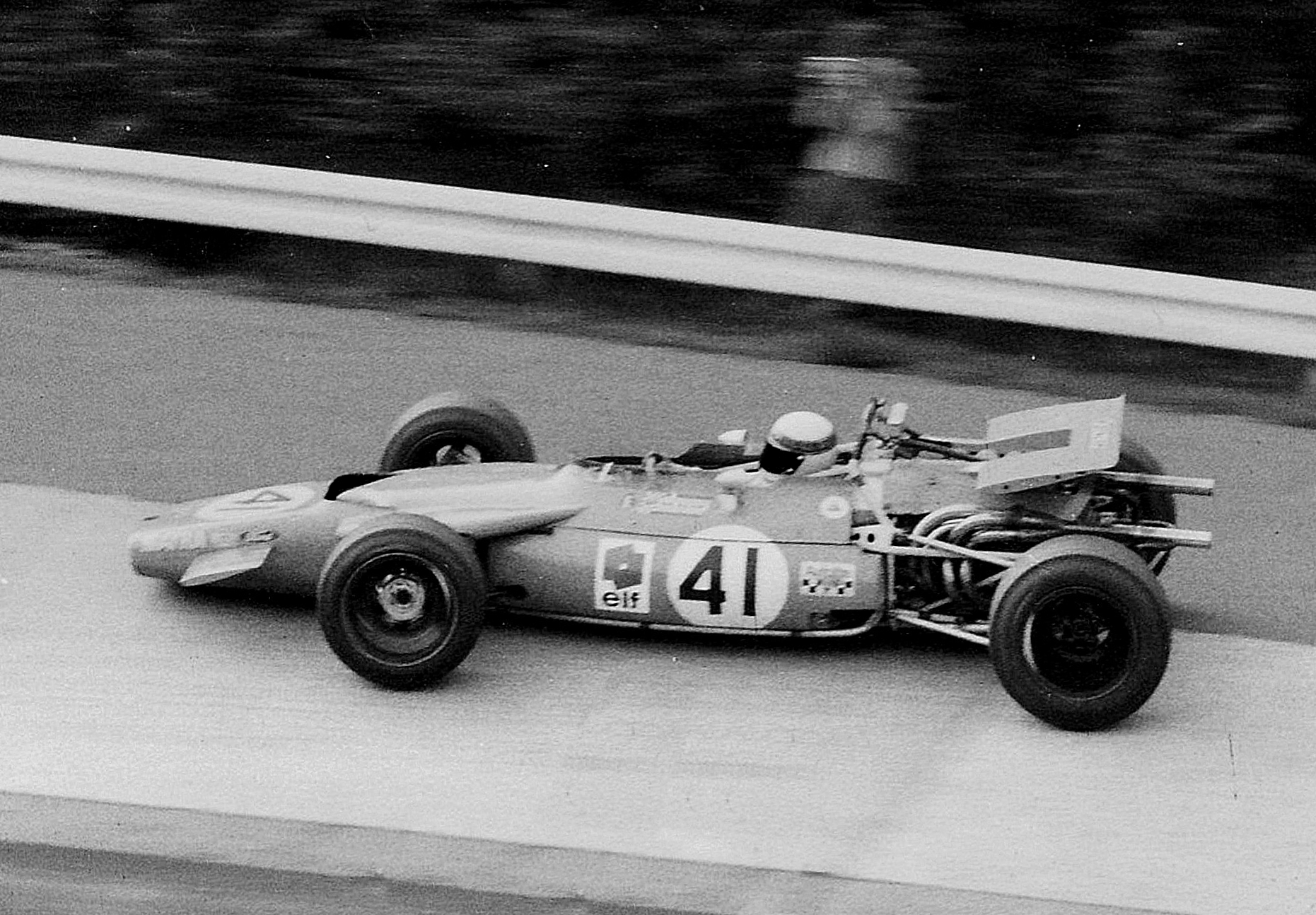
1969: Jackie Stewart pictured with the MS84 at the Nürburgring

Leading French constructor Matra based their 4WD car on the MS80 with which they won the 1969 Constructors' Championship, and from the rear of the cockpit forward the cars looked virtually identical, save for the driveshaft to the front wheels. At the back the engine was mounted back-to-front with the gearbox directly behind the driver, but tellingly the Ferguson transmission and other necessary additions left the car 10% heavier than the two-wheel drive sister cars. Like the Lotus 63, the MS84 made its first appearance at the Dutch Grand Prix, where Jackie Stewart tried the car out but opted to use his MS80, as he would for the rest of the season.

The car was still present at all the remaining races as a spare, and at Silverstone Jean-Pierre Beltoise gave the car its first race and came home ninth, six laps behind Stewart's two-wheel drive Matra (but three laps ahead of Miles's Lotus 63). By the next time the car raced, the front differential had been disconnected and the car effectively ran as an over-weight MS80 with inboard front brakes, memorably giving the lie to Johnny Servoz-Gavin's protestations about the 4WD car being "undriveable" after he finished the Canadian Grand Prix six laps down in sixth place. Servoz-Gavin also drove the car at Watkins Glen, finishing 16 laps down and unclassified, and finally in Mexico, crossing the line "just" two laps down in eighth place.

=== McLaren M9A ===
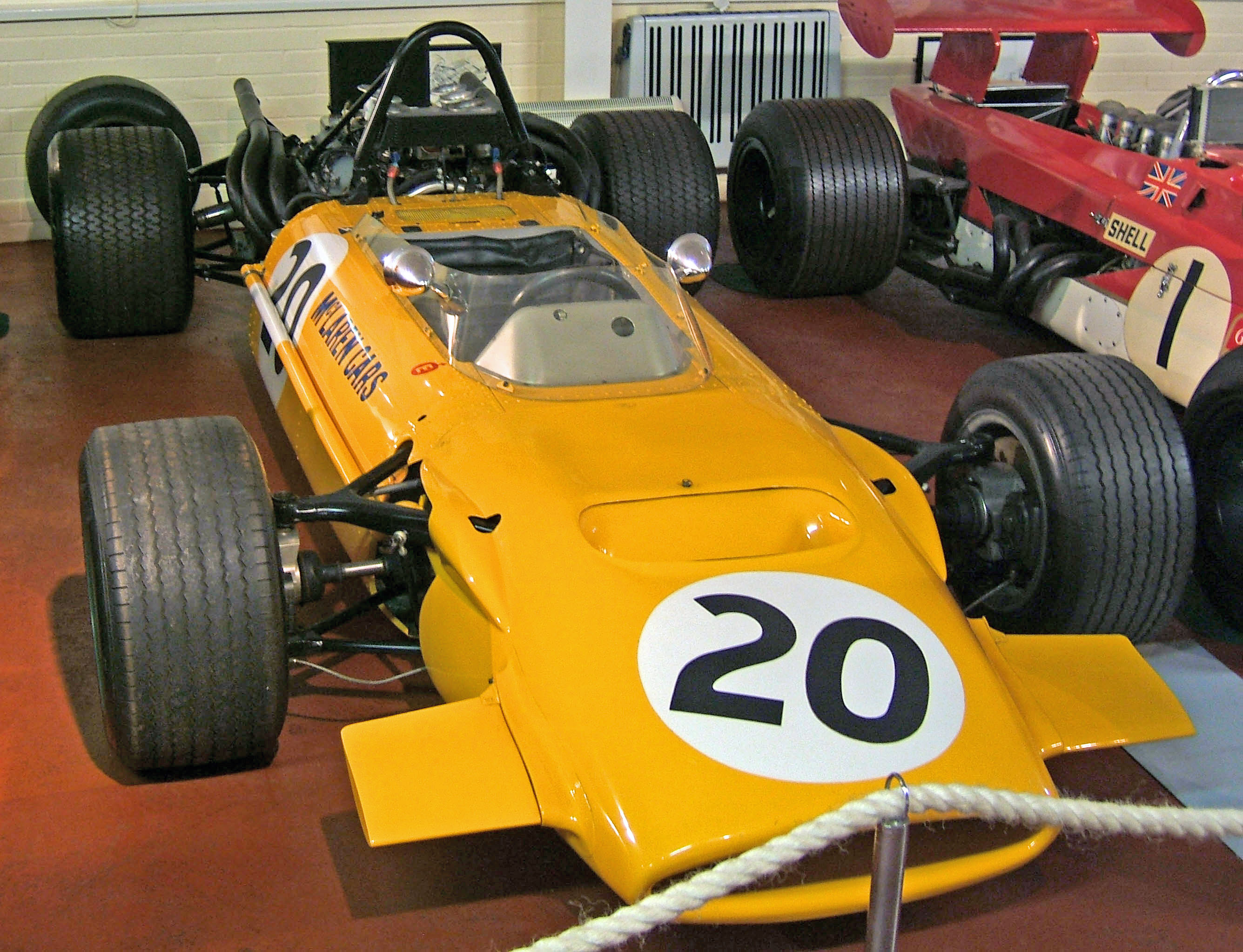
The McLaren M9A.

Bruce McLaren's team was the last front-running team to produce a 4WD car in 1969, a brand new chassis designed by Jo Marquart and designated the M9A. The car, complete with distinctive "tea tray" rear wing, was completed in time for Derek Bell to use in the British Grand Prix alongside the standard M7s, where he retired with suspension failure. After McLaren himself tested the car he compared driving it to "trying to write your signature with someone constantly jogging your elbow" and the car was never raced again.

=== Cosworth ===
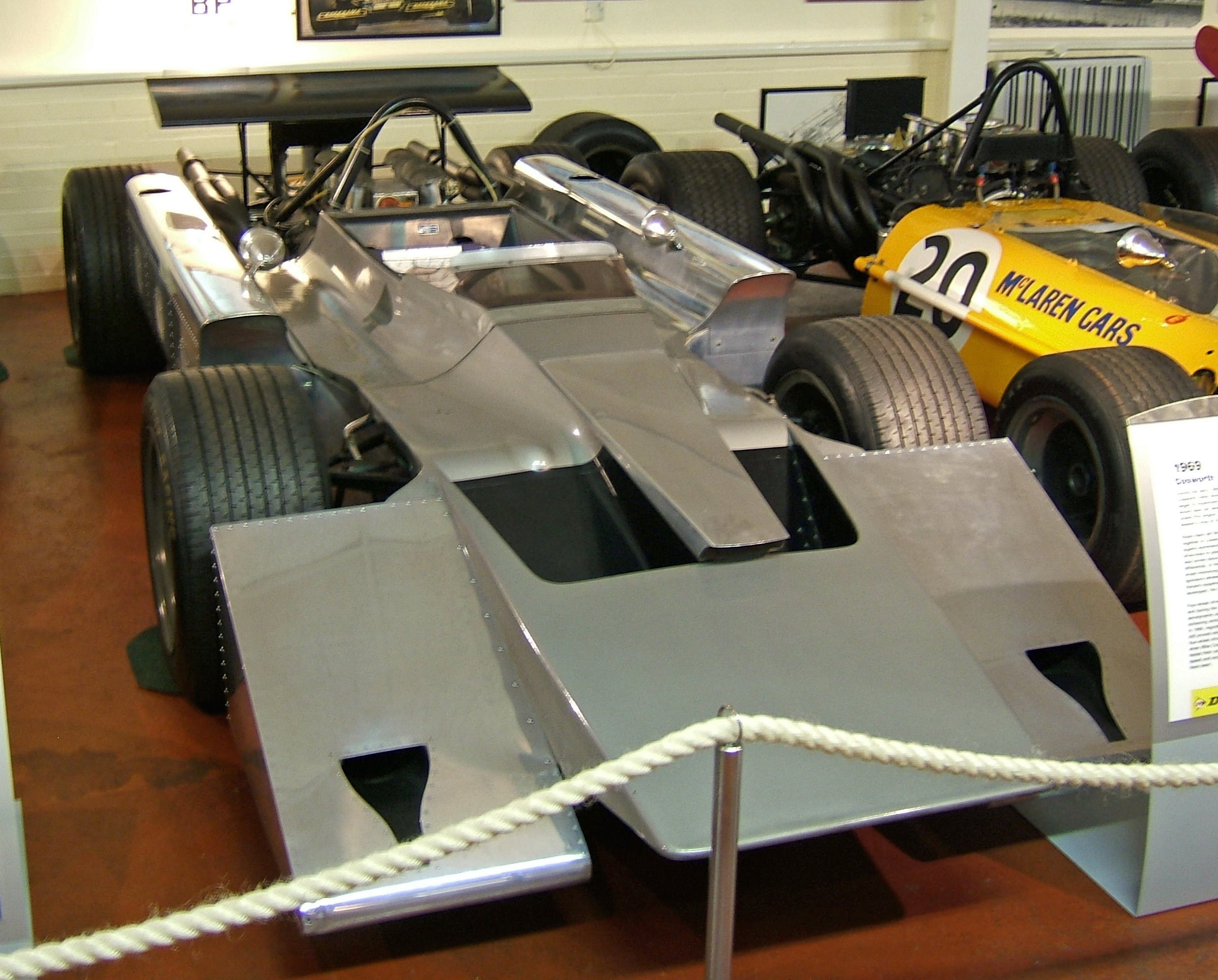
The Cosworth Formula One car.

With Keith Duckworth's DFV engine being the root of the grip problem, it was perhaps to be expected that Cosworth were the first to attempt a 4WD solution. Ford's Walter Hayes, who had backed the DFV, gave the project his blessing and former McLaren designer Robin Herd joined Duckworth in designing the car, which was a pretty radical departure from the normal late-60s cars. The Cosworth featured a very angular shape, with sponsons between the wheels either side of the aluminium monocoque to house the fuel tanks and improve the car's aerodynamics, and the cockpit was quite visibly off-set to the driver's left. Unlike all the other 4WD F1 cars, instead of using the Ferguson transmission Cosworth built their own version from scratch, and even went as far as producing a new gearbox and a bespoke magnesium-cast DFV, perhaps anticipating a future market for their technology.

Trevor Taylor and Cosworth co-founder Mike Costin tested the car extensively, the first problem being the positioning of the oil tank, which for weight distribution had been placed directly behind the driver's backside, causing considerable discomfort. With the oil tank moved back behind the engine and a redesign of the front driveshafts the only major remaining problem was the excessive understeer which dogged all the 4WD cars. A limited-slip front differential was tried with some slight success, but after Jackie Stewart briefly sampled the car reporting that "the car's so heavy on the front, you turn into a corner and whole thing starts driving you", confirming what Taylor and Costin already felt, Hayes withdrew his support and the Cosworth 4WD project was axed shortly before the British Grand Prix.

This remains the only Formula One car Cosworth have ever built, and like the Lotus 63 the car is now on display as part of the Donington Grand Prix Collection. There was a second Cosworth 4WD built out of factory parts by Crosthwaite and Gardner, it was on display at the now closed Fremantle motor museum and now in a private collection in Melbourne Australia.

== Lotus 56B (1971) ==
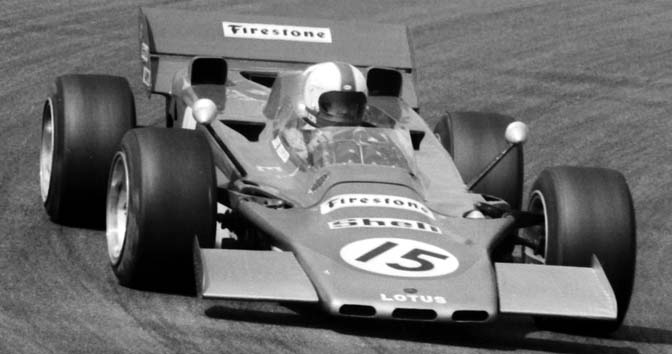
Dave Walker in the 56B at Zandvoort.

The wedge-shaped, gas turbine-powered Lotus 56, one of the most unusual cars ever to race in F1, was originally designed to compete in the 1968 Indianapolis 500 where it nearly won, but with USAC introducing a ban on gas turbines and four-wheel drive for the 1970 race, a new B variant of the car was built to Formula 1 spec with an eye to replacing the failed 63.

With a Pratt & Whitney engine driving the trusty Ferguson-derived transmission without the need for a clutch or gearbox, the car made its Formula 1 debut in the 1971 Race of Champions with Emerson Fittipaldi at the wheel. He qualified seventh out of 15 runners, but retired after 33 laps with a suspension failure. A similar problem forced Reine Wisell out of the Spring Trophy at Oulton Park, and with Fittipaldi back for the International Trophy, the suspension broke yet again in the first heat before the Brazilian took third in the second race, the car's best finish in an F1 event.

Dave Walker was then drafted in to drive the car in the Dutch Grand Prix, qualifying a lowly 22nd. However the race was wet, handing a massive advantage to the 4WD car, and Walker proceeded to carve his way through the field, getting right up to tenth place in only five laps before seriously blotting his copy-book by crashing out, leading Chapman to remark "that was the one race that should, and could, have been won by a four-wheel drive". Reine Wisell had another go with the car in the British Grand Prix, but more problems meant that by the finish he was some 11 laps down. The final F1 entry for a 56B came in the Italian Grand Prix, where the car featured an early prototype of the JPS livery that would go on to become a motor racing icon. Fittipaldi brought the car home in eighth place, a lap down on the closest finish in F1 history.

Fittipaldi drove the car once more in an F5000 event, his second place at Hockenheim marking the best result for the car. By now though it was clear that the 63 and 56B cars had deflected attention from developing the Lotus 72, with Lotus not taking a single win in 1971, and the turbine car was shelved and never raced again.

== Others ==
March and Williams each built cars with an identical 6-wheeled layout, but neither car was ever raced in F1. In both cases it was found that the cars were about the same as normal cars in terms of speed since the extra traction was negated by the added rolling resistance, although the March 2-4-0 was later to have some success in hillclimbs.

It was the Williams FW08D, rather than any 4-wheeled car, which prompted FISA to ban 4WD from Formula 1 in 1982.

In 1950, Archie Butterworth, an enthusiastic engineer / driver, entered his four-wheel drive AJB Special in the non-championship Formula One Daily Express Trophy meeting at Silverstone. The car retired after 1 lap in the first heat and did not participate in the final. The AJB Special was the first car featuring both four-wheel drive and an air-cooled engine to start a Formula One race.
