= Cosworth 4WD =

1969 Formula One car

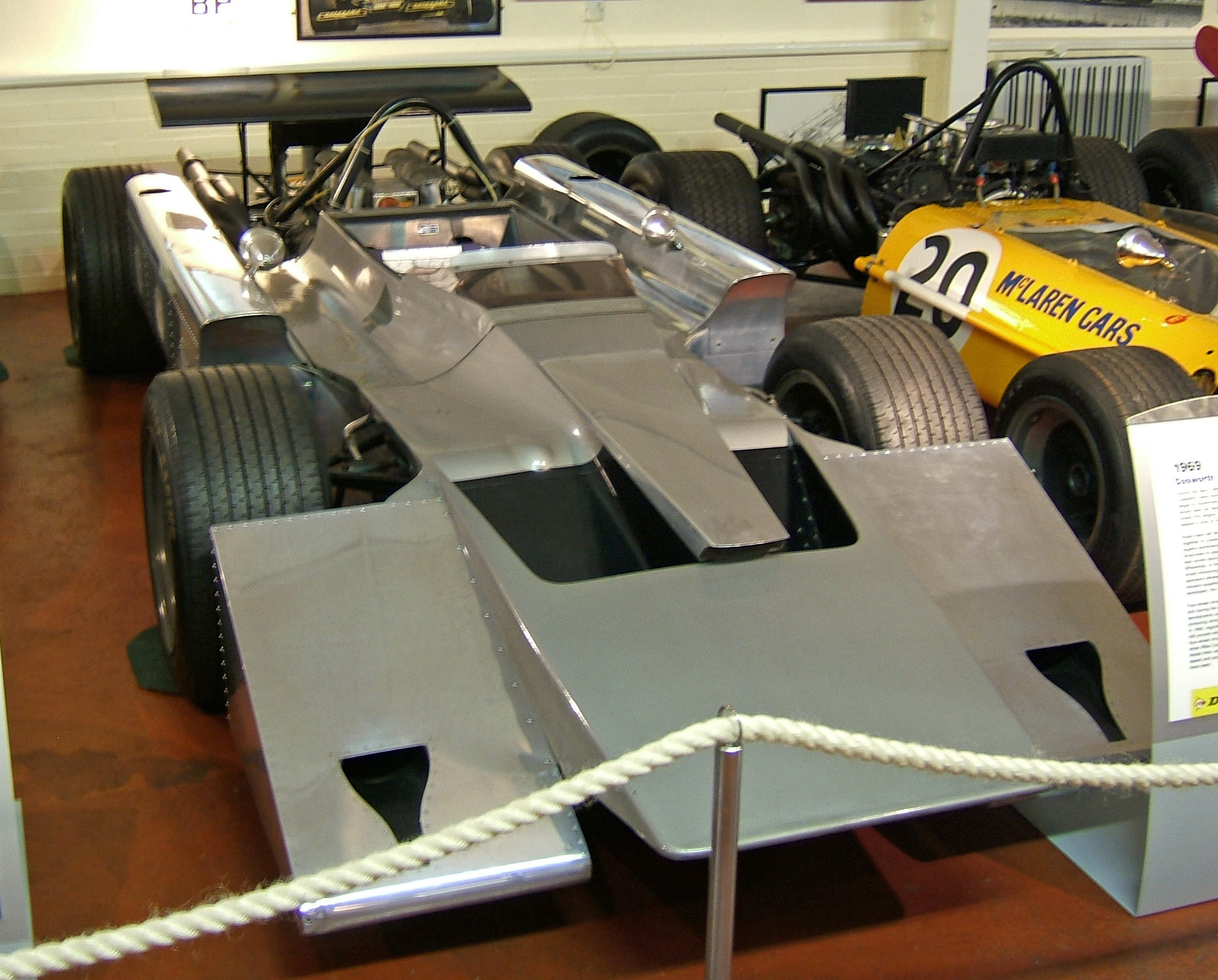
- Cosworth 4WD at the Donington Collection Museum in Leicestershire, United Kingdom
- Category: Formula One
- Designer: Robin Herd
- Production: Cosworth

Technical specifications
- Chassis: monocoque from mallite
- Suspension: double control arms, tappets
- Engine: Ford DFV 3.0 V8
- Transmission: Cosworth manual, 5 gears + reverse
- Tyres: Dunlop

Competition history
- Notable drivers: Trevor Taylor; Mike Costin; Jackie Stewart
Races	Wins	Poles	F/Laps
0	0	0	0

Cosworth 4WD is a Formula One car designed in 1969 by Robin Herd for the Cosworth company. It never participated in a race, as its primary purpose was for testing by Trevor Taylor and Mike Costin to improve the traction of cars powered by Cosworth DFV engines. It is the only Formula One car ever built by Cosworth.

== Concept ==
Cosworth had been supplying engines to Formula One teams since the 1963 season, and from the 1967 season, it developed the DFV units. In the 1968 season, it became apparent that although cars powered by Cosworth engines had a significant advantage over their competitors, they faced issues with cornering. Cosworth aimed to solve this problem. To this end, they hired former McLaren engineer and designer Robin Herd to design the first-ever Formula One car constructed by Cosworth, through which the company intended to identify and eliminate the causes of the cornering issues. Cosworth received financial backing from Ford and began constructing the car. Herd later noted that another reason for attempting to build their own car was Cosworth's desire to be in the spotlight.

== Construction ==
Cosworth's primary goal was to use the technology gained from building engines and apply it to the construction of the car.

Herd assumed that the car would corner better if it had four-wheel drive. This solution was last used in the BRM P67 from 1964. In addition to using the rare four-wheel-drive system in Formula One, it was also decided that the car's body would have a radical, angular shape, and mallite – a type of laminate – would be used in its construction. It was believed that the car's shape would improve its aerodynamics. Unlike other four-wheel-drive Formula One cars, Cosworth did not use the Ferguson transmission system but instead employed their own (designed by Keith Duckworth), and they also developed a new gearbox. The DFV engine block was cast from magnesium, which the company wanted to test, seeing it as the "future" of Formula One. Casting the engine in magnesium was also intended to reduce its weight, and the resulting gains were used to add extra components to the drivetrain. To improve the behavior of the central differential, the engine was mounted in reverse compared to other cars powered by DFV engines. The V8 engine with a displacement of 2,993 cm³ produced around 410 HP at 9,000 rpm. The clutch was mounted at the front, as was common in other 4WD Formula One cars.

The car was equipped with two "floats" between the wheels, connected by loaded floor panels and magnesium bulkheads. The front "float" housed the differential. The gearbox was equipped with a shaft that transmitted power to the central differential, which was angled and positioned to the right of the driver; because of this, the cockpit was slightly shifted to the left. The front and middle shafts ran along the wheelbase, while the rear one was located behind the engine. The gearbox transmitted power to the rear differential. Thanks to the placement of the drive axles inside the car, disc brakes could be used both at the front and the rear. Despite this drivetrain arrangement, Herd later remarked:

It was probably rather shallow thinking. If we had all thought a bit longer, we would probably have realized that due to the prevailing trends at the time, four-wheel drive wasn't practical.

The car had two designs. The original version featured narrow wedges, a tea-tray-shaped rear spoiler, and an oil cooler on top of the engine. The later version was equipped with a smaller rear spoiler, and the front wedges were extended to cover the entire width of the car.

== Testing ==
In 1969, there was a surge of interest in 4WD cars in Formula One; in addition to the Cosworth 4WD, that year saw the introduction of other four-wheel-drive vehicles, including the McLaren M9A, Lotus 63, and Matra MS84.

In 1968, Cosworth persuaded Jim Clark to test their car after the season ended. However, Clark tragically died in an accident at the Hockenheimring. Despite this, Cosworth continued to develop the project. Trevor Taylor and Cosworth co-founder Mike Costin became the test drivers for the Cosworth 4WD. The first issue encountered was the placement of the oil tank. To improve weight distribution, it was located at the rear, directly behind the driver, which caused significant discomfort. The tank was then moved behind the engine, and the front shaft was also redesigned. The car had relatively good grip, but its main issue, which proved to be typical for 4WD Formula One cars, was understeer. Robin Herd noticed this problem and later commented:

The front downforce was much greater than I had anticipated, but we never managed to balance the rear. There were also issues with the differential, and no one who drove the car felt it was properly balanced.

As a result, they attempted to use a limited-slip front differential, but this did not produce the desired results. After driving several laps in the car, Jackie Stewart remarked, It's so heavy at the front that when you enter a corner, it steers you; the car takes control of you, confirming that the issues had not been resolved. Although there were initial plans to enter the car in the British Grand Prix, further development and testing were abandoned due to the ongoing problems with the model and Herd's departure to March Engineering.

== Later fate of the model ==
In 1971, Cosworth donated the model along with its parts to the Donington Grand Prix Collection museum located at the Donington circuit. The vehicle was later purchased by Australia's York Motor Museum. In 2009, the car was put up for auction but was not sold.

== Opinions ==
The 4WD system, combined with the magnesium-cast engine, was described by Formula One journalists as representing forward-thinking for 1969, though this was not matched by the car's clunky chassis design. It was emphasized that the primary issue with the car was the 4WD system. Robin Herd believed that under certain conditions, the car had potential and could even have been groundbreaking in Formula One:

If Keith had decided to build a conventional rear-wheel-drive car and had brought Jim Clark over from Lotus, the history of motor racing might have looked very different.

== Complete Formula One results ==
(key)

Year	Entrant	Engine	Tyres	Drivers	1	2	3	4	5	6	7	8	9	10	11	Points	WCC
1969	Mike Costin	Ford V8	D		RSA	ESP	MON	NED	FRA	GBR	GER	ITA	CAN	USA	MEX	0	-
1969	Mike Costin	Ford V8	D	(United Kingdom) Trevor Taylor						WD						0	-
