= 1968 Tasman Series =

Motor racing competition

The 1968 Tasman Championship for Drivers was a motor racing series contested over eight races during January, February and March 1968, with four races held in New Zealand and four in Australia. The championship was open to Racing Cars fitted with non-supercharged engines with a capacity equal or inferior to 2500cc. It was the fifth annual Tasman Championship.

The championship won by Jim Clark, driving a Lotus 49T.

It was the third and final Tasman Championship win for Clark who was killed in a Formula 2 crash on the ultra fast Hockenheim circuit in West Germany just over a month after the series concluded. Clark won the last of his fifteen career Tasman Series wins when he won the 1968 Australian Grand Prix at the Sandown Raceway in Melbourne, only 0.1 seconds in front of the Dino 246 Tasmania of Chris Amon after a famous duel between the pair.

Reigning 1967 Formula One World Champion Denny Hulme finished equal seventh in the series in his Formula 2 Brabham with a best finish of third in Round 3 for the Lady Wigram Trophy, his first race of the series.

== Schedule ==
Round		Name	Circuit	Date	Winning driver	Winning car	Winning team	Report
New Zealand	1	New Zealand Grand Prix	Pukekohe	6 January	(New Zealand) Chris Amon	Dino 246 Tasmania	C.Amon	Report
New Zealand	2	Levin International	Levin	13 January	(New Zealand) Chris Amon	Dino 246 Tasmania	C.Amon	Report
New Zealand	3	Lady Wigram Trophy	Wigram	20 January	(United Kingdom) Jim Clark	Lotus 49T	Team Lotus	Report
New Zealand	4	Teretonga International	Teretonga	27 January	(New Zealand) Bruce McLaren	BRM P126	Owen Racing Organisation	Report
Australia	5	Surfers Paradise 100	Surfers Paradise	11 February	(United Kingdom) Jim Clark	Lotus 49T	Team Lotus	Report
Australia	6	Warwick Farm International	Warwick Farm	18 February	(United Kingdom) Jim Clark	Lotus 49T	Team Lotus	Report
Australia	7	Australian Grand Prix	Sandown	25 February	(United Kingdom) Jim Clark	Lotus 49T	Team Lotus	Report
Australia	8	South Pacific Trophy	Longford	4 March	(United Kingdom) Piers Courage	McLaren M4A	P.Courage	Report

== Points system ==
Points were awarded at each race on the following basis:

Position	1	2	3	4	5	6
Points	9	6	4	3	2	1

Championship placings were determined by the total number of points scored by a driver in all races.

== Championship standings ==
Pos	Driver	Car	Puk	Lev	Wig	Ter	Sur	War	San	Lon	Pts
1	(United Kingdom) Jim Clark	Lotus 49T Cosworth	Ret	Ret	1	2	1	1	1	5	44
2	(New Zealand) Chris Amon	Dino 246 Tasmania	1	1	2	4	Ret	4	2	7	36
3	(United Kingdom) Piers Courage	McLaren M4A Cosworth	3	2	4	5	3	3	5	1	34
4	(United Kingdom) Graham Hill	Lotus 49T Cosworth					2	2	3	6	17
=	(Australia) Frank Gardner	Brabham BT23D Alfa Romeo	2	Ret	Ret	3	9	Ret	4	3	17
6	(New Zealand) Bruce McLaren	BRM P126	Ret	Ret	5	1					11
7	(Mexico) Pedro Rodríguez	BRM P126; BRM P261	Ret	Ret	6	Ret	10	6	Ret	2	8
=	(New Zealand) Denny Hulme	Brabham BT23 Cosworth			3	6	6	5	9	DNS	8
9	(New Zealand) Jim Palmer	McLaren M4A Cosworth	4	3	7	8					3
10	(United Kingdom) Richard Attwood	BRM P126					Ret	Ret	6	4	4
11	(Australia) Leo Geoghegan	Lotus 39 Repco					4	Ret	7	DNS	3
=	(New Zealand) Roly Levis	Brabham BT18 Ford	8	4	8	10					3
13	(Australia) Kevin Bartlett	Brabham BT11A Coventry Climax					5	Ret	8	DNS	2
=	(New Zealand) Red Dawson	Brabham BT7A Coventry Climax	Ret	5	9	DNS					2
=	(Australia) Paul Bolton	Brabham BT22 Coventry Climax	5	Ret	Ret						2
16	(New Zealand) Graeme Lawrence	Brabham BT18 Ford	6	9	Ret	9					1
=	(New Zealand) Bill Stone	Brabham BT6 Ford	10	6	10	Ret					0
—	(New Zealand) Bryan Faloon	Brabham BT4 Coventry Climax	7	7	13	DNS					0
—	(New Zealand) David Oxton	Brabham BT16 Ford	Ret	10	Ret	7					0
—	(Australia) Glyn Scott	Lotus 27 Ford					7	10			0
—	(Australia) Jack Brabham	Brabham BT21E Repco					7	Ret			0
—	(Australia) John Harvey	Brabham BT11A Coventry Climax						Ret	Ret	8	0
—	(New Zealand) Frank Radisich	Lotus 22 Ford		8		DNS					0
—	(Australia) Malcolm Aldred	Lotus 22 Ford					8				0
—	(Australia) Alfredo Costanzo	Elfin Mono Ford						8			0
—	(New Zealand) John Nicholson	Lotus 27 Ford	9			DNS					0
—	(Australia) Ian Ferguson	Lotus 27 Ford						9			0
—	(Australia) John McCormack	Brabham BT4 Coventry Climax								9	0
—	(New Zealand) Ken Smith	Lotus 41 Ford	12	DNS	11	Ret					0
—	(New Zealand) Don MacDonald	Brabham BT10 Ford	11		12	DNQ					0
—	(New Zealand) Graham McRae	Brabham BT6 Ford		Ret	14	Ret					0
—	(New Zealand) Peter Yock	Lotus 33 BRM	Ret	Ret	DNQ	Ret					0
—	(New Zealand) Vince Anderson	Brabham BT11A Coventry Climax	Ret								0
—	(New Zealand) Grahame Harvey	Brabham BT6 Ford				Ret					0
—	(Australia) Greg Cusack	Brabham BT23 Repco					Ret	Ret	Ret	DNS	0
—	(Australia) Brian Page	Brabham BT6 Ford					Ret	Ret			0
—	(Australia) Max Stewart	Rennmax Ford						Ret			0
—	(Australia) Fred Gibson	Brabham Coventry Climax						Ret			0
—	(Australia) Mel McEwin	Lotus 32B Coventry Climax								Ret	0
—	(New Zealand) Tony Batchelor	Brabham BT6 Ford				DNS					0
Pos	Driver	Car	Puk	Lev	Wig	Ter	Sur	War	San	Lon	Pts

Colour	Result
Gold	Winner
Silver	Second place
Bronze	Third place
Green	Points classification
Blue	Non-points classification
Blue	Non-classified finish (NC)
Purple	Retired, not classified (Ret)
Red	Did not qualify (DNQ)
Red	Did not pre-qualify (DNPQ)
Black	Disqualified (DSQ)
White	Did not start (DNS)
White	Withdrew (WD)
White	Race cancelled (C)
Blank	Did not practice (DNP)
Blank	Did not arrive (DNA)
Blank	Excluded (EX)
