= Peter Westbury =

British racing driver (1938–2015)

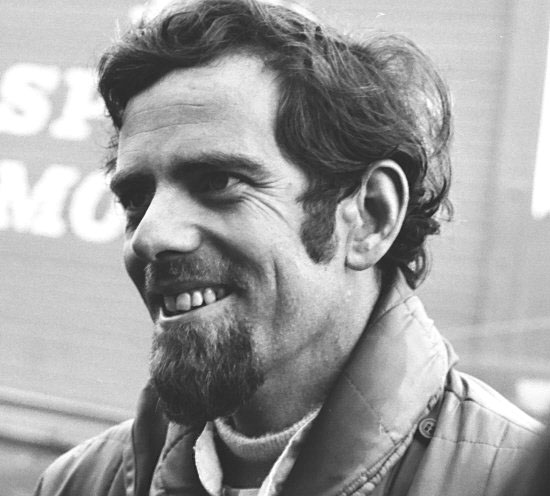
- Peter Westbury (1970)
- Born: 26 May 1938; Roehampton, London, UK
- Died: 7 December 2015 (aged 77); Scarborough, Trinidad and Tobago

Formula One World Championship career
- Nationality: (United Kingdom) British
- Active years: 1969–1970
- Team(s): non-works Brabham, BRM
- Entries: 2 (1 start)
- Championships: 0
- Wins: 0
- Podiums: 0
- Career points: 0
- Pole positions: 0
- Fastest laps: 0
- First entry: 1969 German Grand Prix
- Last entry: 1970 United States Grand Prix

Peter Westbury (26 May 1938 – 7 December 2015) was a British racing driver from England. He participated in two World Championship Formula One Grands Prix, scoring no championship points. In 1969, he raced a Formula 2 Brabham-Cosworth, driving in his first Grand Prix in the 1969 German Grand Prix. He finished ninth on the road, fifth in the F2 class. The following year, he failed to qualify for the 1970 United States Grand Prix driving a works BRM, after an engine failure.

Early in his racing career, he campaigned a homebuilt special called the M.G.W., graduating to a Cooper-Climax in 1960 which was later fitted with a Daimler V8 engine. Westbury won the British Hill Climb Championship twice, in 1963 and 1964. In 1963, he drove the self-built Felday, with supercharged Daimler V8 2.6-litre motor. The following year he won in the 2.5-litre Climax-engined Ferguson P99 with four-wheel-drive, on loan from Ferguson Research Ltd. Westbury also drove the Ferguson P99 in the 1964 Brighton Speed Trials and at the First International Drag Festival, a series of six events held in England that year, where the car covered the standing-start quarter mile in 11.01 seconds. He also drove a Lotus 23-BRM sports car at the Drag Festival.

During 1965, Westbury developed the Felday-BRM 4 sports car with four-wheel-drive. The car won on its debut at Brands Hatch on Boxing Day, 26 December 1965, driven by Mac Daghorn. At Mallory Park on 13 March 1966, Peter Westbury and Mac Daghorn shared the car, each winning a race. Jim Clark raced the Felday 4 in the Guards Trophy at Brands Hatch on 29 August 1966. The Felday 5 sports car was fitted with a 7-litre Ford Galaxie engine and four wheel drive, but only raced briefly. The Felday 6 was a 4.7-litre Ford-powered hillclimb single-seater, with rear wheel drive, built for Tony Griffiths.

In 1967, Westbury raced a Brabham-Ford Formula Three car in England and in Continental Europe. He won the F3 race at the Silverstone circuit on 29 April, the Grand Prix des Frontières at Chimay on 14 May, and also at the Auvergne Trophy meeting on 18 June 1967, on the daunting Clermont-Ferrand circuit in France. The same year, he resuscitated the old BRM P67 four-wheel-drive F1 car, designed by Mike Pilbeam in 1964, for David Good to campaign in the British Hill Climb Championship. The car led the series at the half-way mark, but then passed into the hands of Peter Lawson, who revamped it for 1968. The car was a dominant winner of the series in 1968.

== Racing record ==
=== Complete British Saloon Car Championship results ===
(key) (Races in bold indicate pole position; races in italics indicate fastest lap.)

Year	Team	Car	Class	1	2	3	4	5	6	7	8	9	10	11	12	Pos.	Pts	Class
1969	Duncan Hamilton Racing	Ford Escort TC	C	BRH	SIL	SNE	THR	SIL; 10	CRY	MAL	CRO	SIL	OUL	BRH	BRH	38th	2	14th

=== Complete Formula One World Championship results ===
(key)

Year	Entrant	Chassis	Engine	1	2	3	4	5	6	7	8	9	10	11	12	13	WDC	Points
1969	Felday Engineering Ltd	Brabham BT30 (F2)	Cosworth Straight-4	RSA	ESP	MON	NED	FRA	GBR	GER; 9	ITA	CAN	USA	MEX			NC	0
1970	Yardley Team BRM	BRM P153	BRM V12	RSA	ESP	MON	BEL	NED	FRA	GBR	GER	AUT	ITA	CAN	USA; DNQ	MEX	NC	0

Sporting positions
Preceded by Arthur Owen	British Hill Climb Champion; 1963–1964	Succeeded by Tony Marsh
