= 1968 Australian Grand Prix =

- Race 7 of 8 in 1968 Tasman Series

Race details
- Date: 25 February 1968
- Location: Sandown Park, Melbourne, Victoria, Australia
- Course: Permanent racing facility
- Course length: 3.1 km (1.92 miles)
- Distance: 55 laps, 170.5 km (105.6 miles)
- Weather: Sunny

Pole position
Driver	(Australia) Jack Brabham	Repco Brabham
- Time: 1'06.7

Fastest lap
Driver	(New Zealand) Chris Amon	Ferrari
- Time: 1'07.0 (166.7 km/h, 103.6 mph)

Podium
First	(United Kingdom) Jim Clark	Lotus-Ford Cosworth
Second	(New Zealand) Chris Amon	Ferrari
Third	(United Kingdom) Graham Hill	Lotus-Ford Cosworth

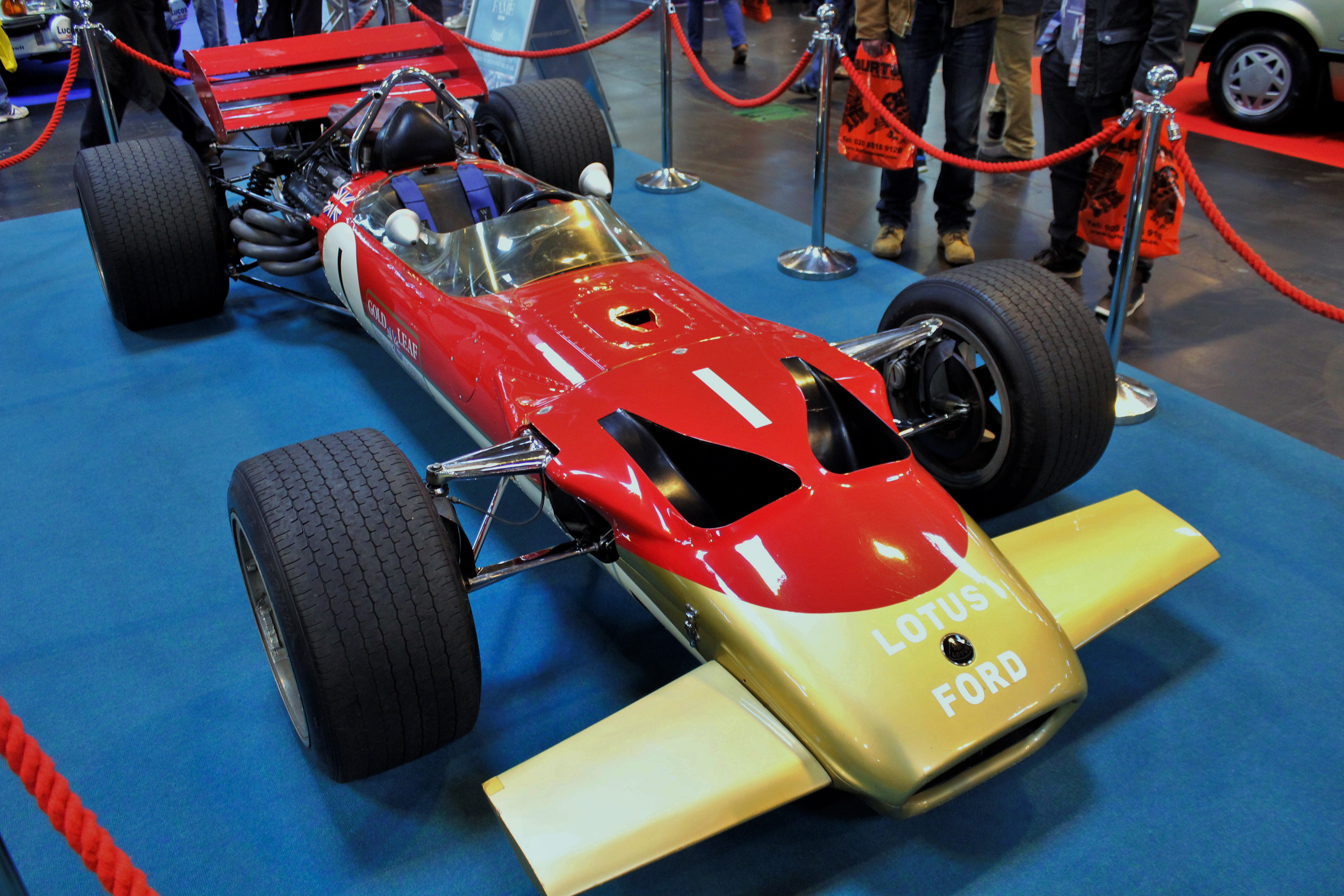
Jim Clark won the race driving a Lotus 49T, similar to the Lotus 49B pictured above

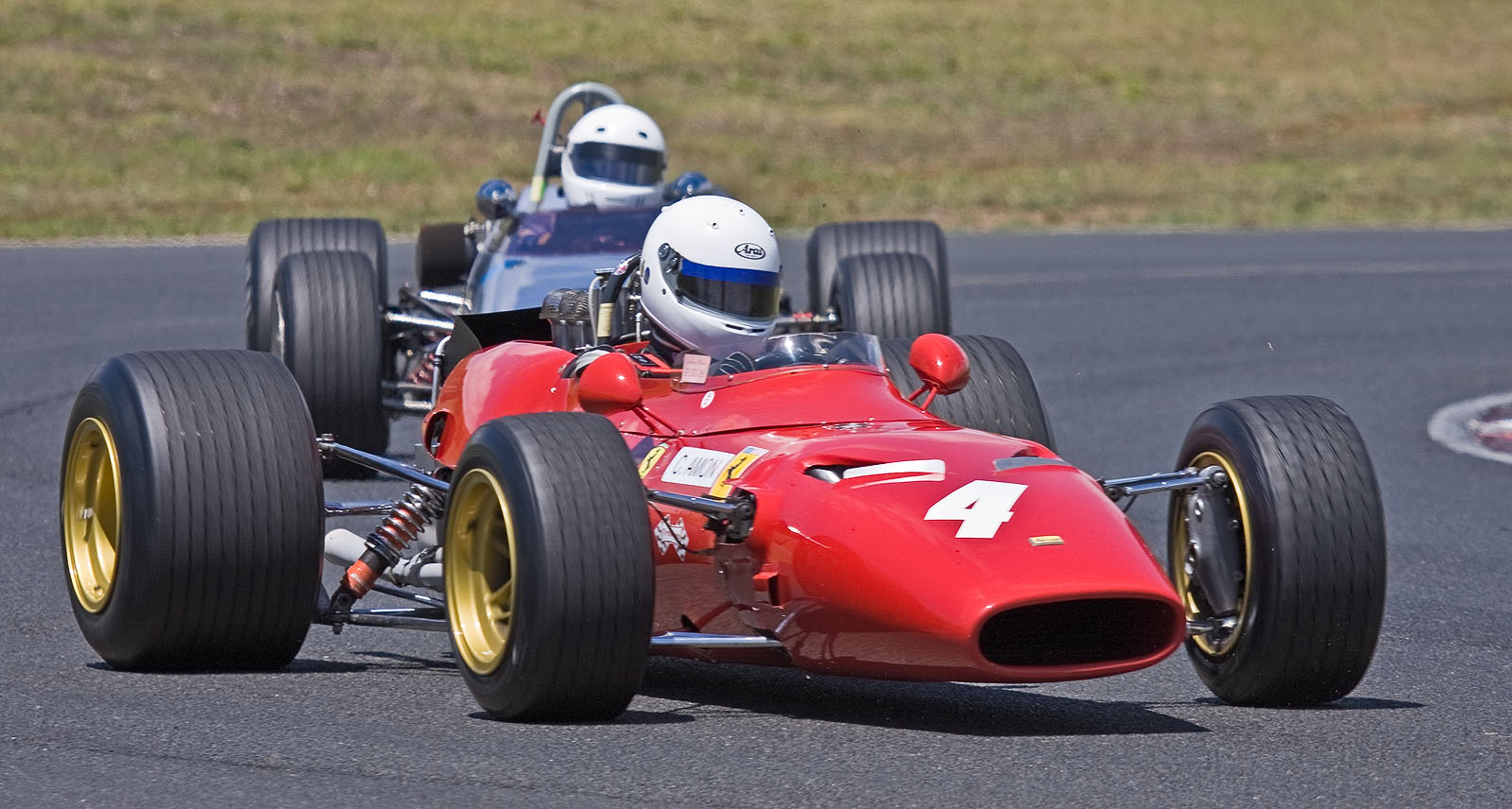
Chris Amon placed second driving a Ferrari Dino 246T/68, similar to that pictured above

The 1968 Australian Grand Prix was a motor race held at Sandown Park in Victoria, Australia on 25 February 1968. The race was open to Racing Cars complying with the Australian National Formula or the Australian 1½ Litre Formula. It was the thirty third Australian Grand Prix and was also round seven of the 1968 Tasman Series. The race was staged by the Light Car Club of Australia and was sponsored by the Royal Automobile Club of Victoria.

Jim Clark, driving a Lotus 49T, won by 0.1 seconds from Chris Amon (Ferrari Dino 246T/68), with whom he battled for the lead throughout the race. Clark's victory was rewarded with the Lex Davison Trophy and the Royal Automobile Club of Victoria Trophy. It proved to be the last major victory for the Scotsman. Twice winner of the World Championship of Drivers, three-time Tasman Series champion and the winner of the 1965 Indianapolis 500, Clark was killed in a Formula 2 crash at the Hockenheim circuit in West Germany six weeks after the race.

In his last drive in an Australian Grand Prix, Jack Brabham started the race from pole position but retired with engine failure. Chris Amon set the fastest race lap.

Leo Geoghegan (Lotus 39 Repco) was the first Australian resident driver to finish, an achievement which was rewarded with the Langridge Cup.

== Classification ==
Results as follows:

Pos	No.	Driver	Entrant	Car	Laps	Time / Comment
1	6	(United Kingdom) Jim Clark	Gold Leaf Team Lotus with Ford Australia	Lotus 49T / Cosworth DFW 2.5L V8	55	1h 02m 40.3s
2	4	(New Zealand) Chris Amon	Chris Amon	Ferrari Dino 246T/68 / Ferrari 2.4L V6	55	1h 02m 40.4s
3	5	(United Kingdom) Graham Hill	Gold Leaf Team Lotus with Ford Australia	Lotus 49T / Cosworth DFW 2.5L V8	55	1h 03m 39.6s
4	8	(Australia) Frank Gardner	Alec Mildren Racing Pty. Ltd.	Brabham BT23D / Alfa Romeo 2.5L V8	55	1h 03m 39.8s
5	18	(United Kingdom) Piers Courage	P. Courage	McLaren M4A / Cosworth FVA 1.6L I4	54	
6	12	(United Kingdom) Richard Attwood	Owen Racing Organisation	BRM P126 / BRM 2.5L V12	53	
7	10	(Australia) Leo Geoghegan	Geoghegan Racing Division	Lotus 39 / Repco 2.5L V8	53	
8	9	(Australia) Kevin Bartlett	Alec Mildren Racing Pty. Ltd.	Brabham BT11A / Coventry Climax FPF 2.5L I4	53	
9	1	(New Zealand) Denny Hulme	Racing Team S.A.	Repco Brabham BT23A / Cosworth FVA	50	
Ret	2	(Australia) Jack Brabham	Ecurie Vitesse S.A.	Repco Brabham BT23E / Repco 2.5L V8	21	Engine
Ret	7	(Australia) Greg Cusack	Scuderia Veloce	Repco Brabham BT23A / Repco 2.5L V8	21	??
Ret	3	(Australia) John Harvey	Bob Jane Racing Team	Repco Brabham BT11A / Repco 2.5L V8	16	Gearbox
Ret	11	(Mexico) Pedro Rodriguez	Owen Racing Organisation	BRM P126 / BRM 2.5L V12	10	Engine
DNS	11	(Australia) Geoff Vercoe	D. G. Fraser	Cicada BRM	-	Practice accident

=== Notes ===
- Attendance: 12,000
- Winner's average speed: 101.5 mph (163.3 km/h)

Preceded by 1968 Warwick Farm International	Tasman Series; 1968	Succeeded by 1968 South Pacific Trophy
Preceded by 1967 Australian Grand Prix	Australian Grand Prix; 1968	Succeeded by 1969 Australian Grand Prix
