= Mike Pilbeam =

British motorsport designer and engineer (born 1937)

- Born: March 1937 (age 88–89); UK
- Occupations: Motorsport engineer and designer
- Years active: 1959–
- Known for: Formula One designer. (BRM, Lotus, Surtees)
- Notable work: BRM P67, BRM P201, LEC CRP1

Michael Roy Pilbeam (born March 1937) is a British motorsport designer and engineer known for his work with BRM, Lotus, Surtees and his own company, Pilbeam Racing Designs. An early design was the experimental four wheel drive Formula One BRM P67 of 1964. As of 2014, Pilbeam's company continued to produce hillclimb cars and sports prototype chassis for endurance racing.

== Biography ==
=== Formula One ===
Pilbeam spent much of his early life in West London, and had little interest in competition cars until he attended the 1958 British Grand Prix, whilst at Bristol University. In 1959, he constructed a small sportscar with which he competed himself, but without much success. However a later design and an association with club racer Tony Gould brought some success in the 1,172 cc (71.5 cu in) class. In 1963, he joined BRM as a stress engineer. He assisted in the construction and design of the P67 whilst still an apprentice and the actual design is usually credited to Tony Rudd. The car, driven by Richard Attwood, was entered for the 1964 British Grand Prix at Brands Hatch but was withdrawn after practice. It did not make any further appearances until 1968, when it appeared in hillclimb events, initially driven by Peter Westbury and subsequently by Peter Lawson and was a championship winning machine. After the abandonment of the P67 project, Pilbeam worked on the BRM H16 engine, helping to develop it to the point where Jim Clark was able to win the 1966 United States Grand Prix with a Lotus 43-BRM.

Pilbeam moved to Ford at Dunton, Essex in 1966, where he worked in the advanced chassis department. He moved to Lotus in 1969, where he worked on the four-wheel-drive Lotus 63, alongside Maurice Philippe, and also on the Lotus 49B and 72 models.

Pilbeam left Lotus in 1972, moving to Surtees where he worked on the Surtees TS9, but in 1973 returned to BRM. Chief designer Tony Southgate had left BRM towards the end of the 1972 season and Pilbeam accepted a job as manager of the design office. This gave him the chance to design the BRM P201 for 1974, which was still competing as late as the 1977 Formula One season.

=== Pilbeam Racing Designs ===
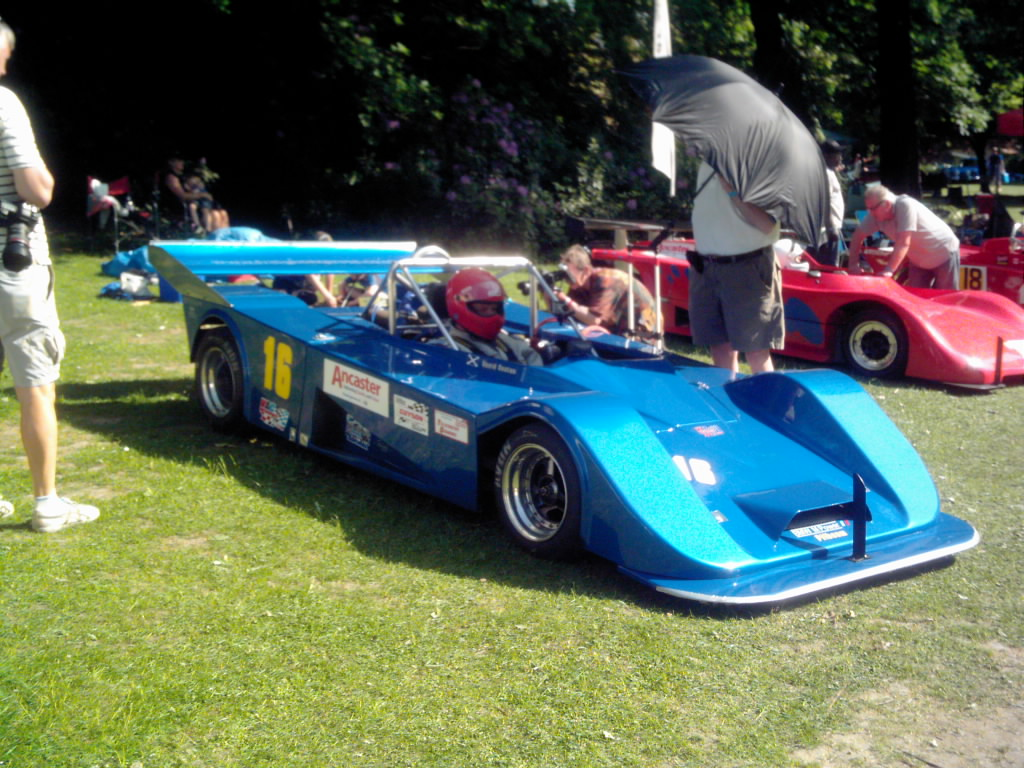
Pilbeam MP43-BMW at 'Motor Sport at the Palace', Crystal Palace (circuit) 27 May 2012

Pilbeam left BRM in late 1974, after Louis Stanley took control of the company, and in 1975 established Pilbeam Racing Designs, initially working from home. His first design was a Formula Atlantic chassis for Tom Wheatcroft which was also adapted to Formula Two, where it was driven by Brian Henton. Subsequently, Pilbeam began constructing hillclimb cars. Pilbeam cars won the British Hill Climb Championship 17 times between 1977 and 1997.

Pilbeam was also involved in the design of the Penske PC3, as well as engineering the RAM Racing Brabham BT44s in 1976.

He also designed the LEC CRP1 F1 car for David Purley, which competed in the 1977 Formula One season. In this machine, during practice for the 1977 British Grand Prix at Silverstone, Purley was involved in one of the heaviest impacts where a driver has survived. Pilbeam has a reputation for the structural integrity of his designs and it has been considered that this was crucial to the driver's survival.

Other freelance work continued, but the F2 MP42 ground effect car commissioned by Mike Earle in 1979 was not successful, although hillclimb success kept the company in good order.

A Pilbeam-modified Brabham BT38-Cosworth won the British Hillclimb Championship in 1977 and in 1979, Pilbeam designed the MP40, which was a hillclimb car to European Formula Two specification. This machine won British Hillclimb titles in 1979 and from 1981 to 1984, powered by a Brian Hart engine. Pilbeam moved into his own premises, in a former part of BRM's operation at Bourne, Lincolnshire in 1981 and produced uncompetitive designs for Formula Ford 2000 and Formula Three in 1982 and 1983, although the hillclimb designs continued to be successful.

In 1997 new premises at Bourne were opened by Bette Hill, (widow of Graham), and Pilbeam continued to work within the industry on both road and racing car projects on a freelance basis. Pilbeam's own designs continued to be produced in small numbers to order and when his freelance work allowed.

Pilbeam Racing Designs was involved in the development of the BRM P301 sportscar in the mid-1990s before subsequently producing their own chassis to compete in the Le Mans 24 hour race and in the World Endurance Championship in the LMP2 class, between 2001 and 2007 and in 2014, produced the MP100 intended as a customer car for LMP2 and the Le Mans race itself.
