= Lotus 49 =

Formula One racing car

Lotus 49 Lotus 49B Lotus 49C Lotus 49T
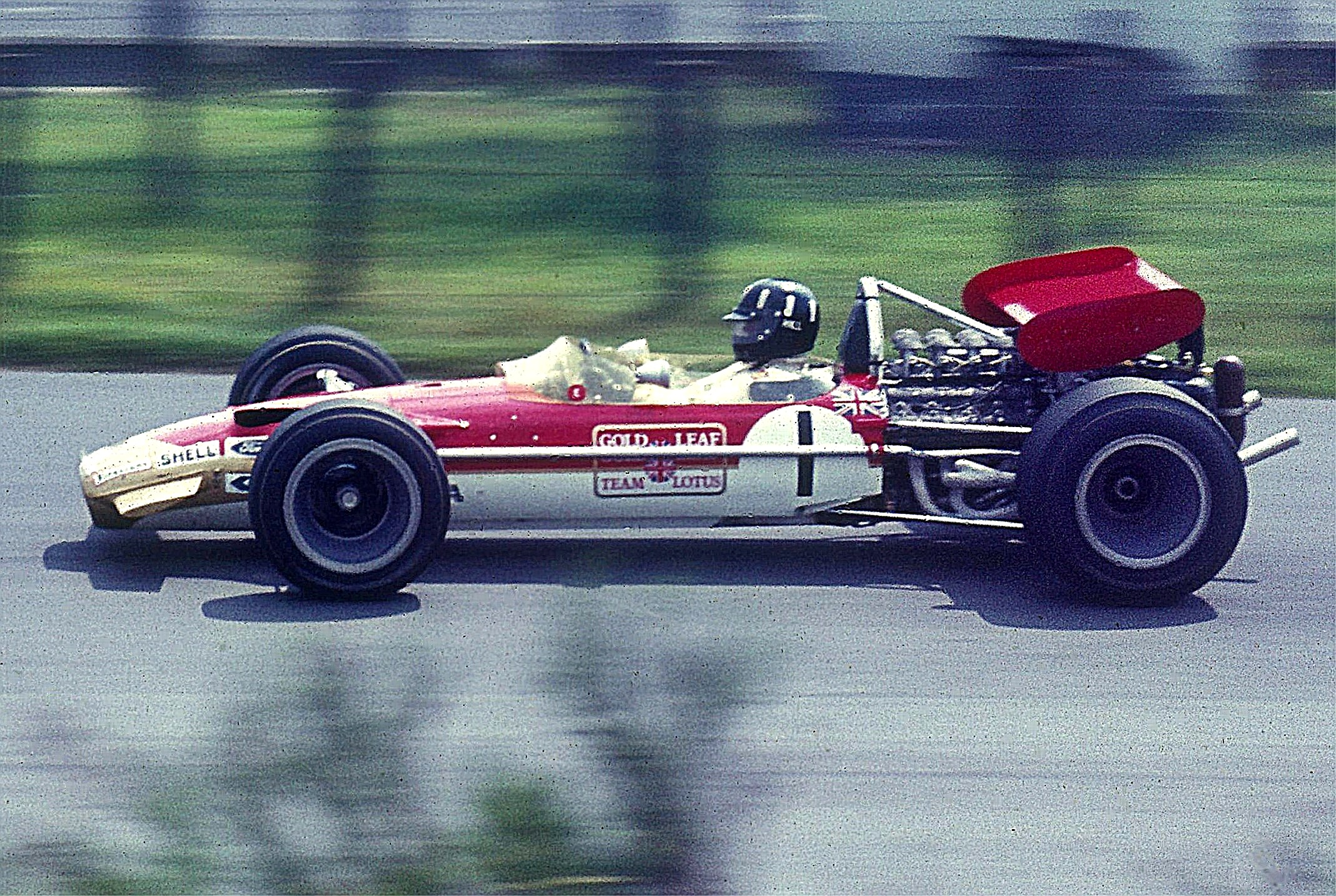
- Graham Hill driving the 49B at the 1969 German Grand Prix
- Category: Formula One
- Constructor: Lotus
- Designers: Colin Chapman (Technical director); Maurice Philippe (Chief designer)
- Predecessor: Lotus 43
- Successor: Lotus 63 / Lotus 72

Technical specifications
- Chassis: Aluminium monocoque
- Axle track: 1,524mm (60in) front and 1,549mm (61in) rear
- Wheelbase: 2,413 mm (95.0 in)
- Engine: Ford Cosworth DFV, 2,998 cc (183 cu in), V8, NA, mid-mounted
- Transmission: Hewland-Lotus 5-speed manual gearbox
- Power: 420-440 hp @ 9,000-10,000 rpm
- Weight: 501 kg (1,105 lb)
- Fuel: Esso (9 GP), Shell
- Tyres: Firestone, Dunlop

Competition history
- Notable entrants: Team Lotus; Gold Leaf Team Lotus (1968-1970); Rob Walker Racing Team; Ecurie Bonnier; Team Gunston; Pete Lovely Volkswagen Inc.
- Notable drivers: (United Kingdom) Jim Clark (United Kingdom) Graham Hill (United States) Mario Andretti (Austria) Jochen Rindt (Switzerland) Jo Siffert (Brazil) Emerson Fittipaldi
- Debut: 1967 Dutch Grand Prix
Races	Wins	Podiums	Poles	F/Laps
42	12	23	19	13
- Constructors' Championships: 2 (1968, 1970 (Note: Total points scored by all Lotus-Ford cars, including 45 points scored by drivers of Lotus 72 variants.))
- Drivers' Championships: 2 (Graham Hill, 1968 / Jochen Rindt, 1970)

The Lotus 49 was a Formula One racing car designed by Colin Chapman and Maurice Philippe for the 1967 F1 season. It was one of the first F1 cars to use a stressed member engine combined with a monocoque to reduce weight, after BRM, with other teams adopting the concept after its success. An iteration of it, the 49B, adopted, after Ferrari, the use of strutted aerofoils to generate downforce.

Jim Clark won on the car's debut, in 1967, and it would also provide him with the last win of his career, in 1968. Graham Hill went on to win that year's title and the car continued winning races until 1970.

== Concept ==
After a difficult first year for Lotus in the three-litre formula using the heavy and unreliable BRM H16 engine, Chapman and Philippe went back to the drawing board and came up with a design that was both back to basics and forward-thinking. Taking inspiration from earlier designs, particularly the BRM P83, Lotus 43, and Lotus 38 Indycar, the 49 was the first F1 car to be powered by the Ford Cosworth DFV engine, after Chapman convinced Ford to finance Cosworth designer Keith Duckworth's DFV design and build a F1 power-plant.

The 49 was an advanced design in Formula 1 because of its chassis configuration. The specially designed engine became a stress-bearing structural member (seen earlier with the H16 engine in the Lotus 43 and BRM P83, and prior to that in the front-engined Lancia D50 of 1954), bolted to the monocoque at one end and the suspension and gearbox at the other. Since then, virtually all Formula 1 cars have been built this way.

The model continued to be a testbed for several new pieces of racecar technology and presentation with the introduction of the 49B for the 1968 Monaco Grand Prix. Following Ferrari's introduction of strutted wings in F1, this chassis was the first Formula One car to use aerofoil wings mounted directly to wheel hubs, following their success on Jim Hall's Chaparral 2E. Originally these wings were bolted directly to the suspension and were supported by slender struts. The wings were mounted several feet above the chassis of the car for effective use in clean air, however after several breakages which led to dangerous accidents, the high wings were banned and Lotus was forced to mount the wings directly to the bodywork.

== Racing history ==
=== Formula One ===
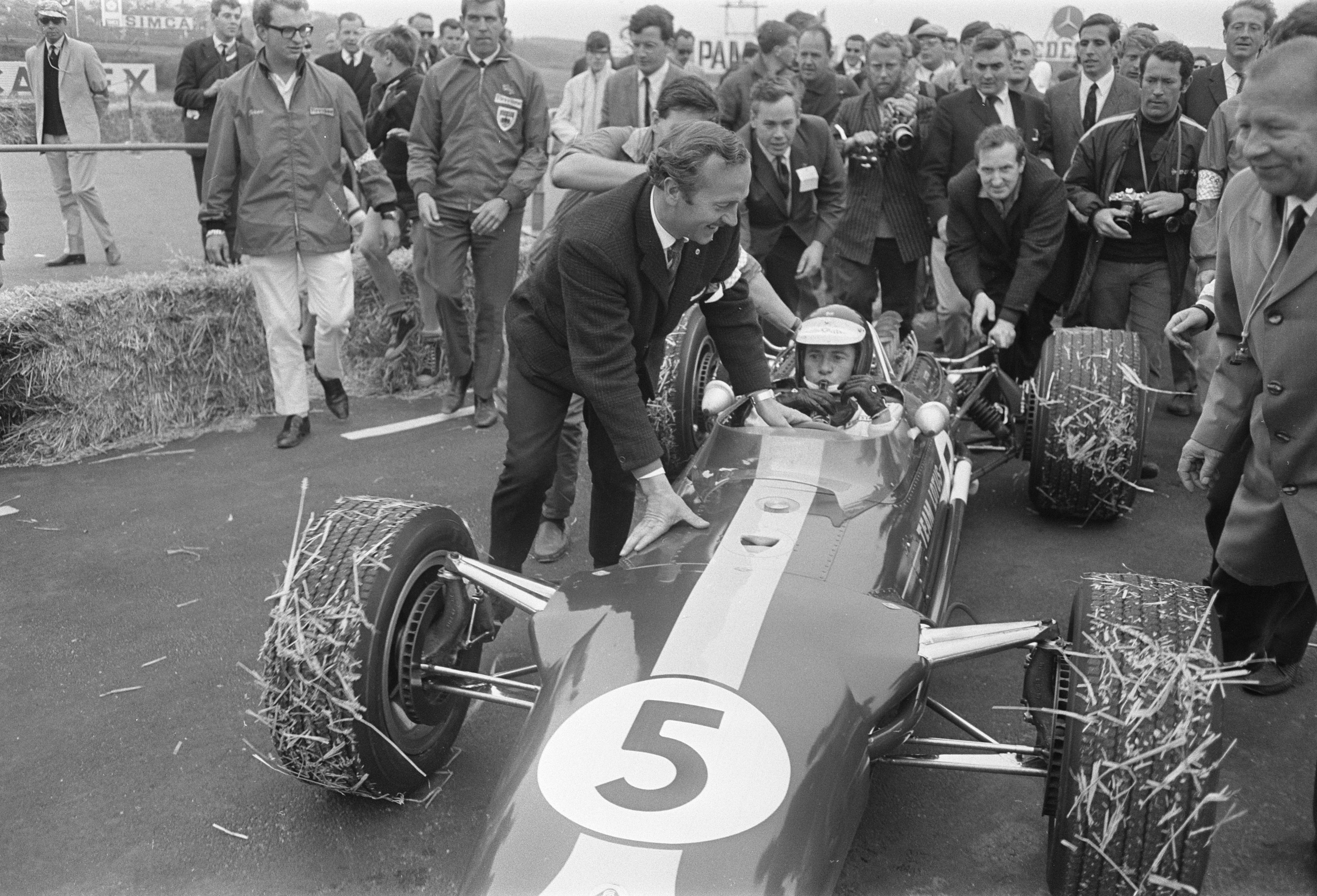
Jim Clark being congratulated by Colin Chapman after winning with the 1967 Dutch Grand Prix, the Lotus 49's first World Championship race

In testing, Graham Hill found the Lotus 49 easy to drive and responsive, but the power of the Ford engine difficult to handle at first. The V8 would give sudden bursts of power that Hill had reservations about. After his first run in the car, he said in typical witty fashion, 'It's got some poke! Not a bad old tool.' Jim Clark won with ease driving the 49 in its debut race at Zandvoort, and took another three wins during the season, although early unreliability with the DFV ended his championship hopes. The 49 had problems in its first race for Hill, and it had spark plug trouble at the 1967 Belgian Grand Prix, held on the 8.76 mile (14.73 kilometer) Spa-Francorchamps.

Clark and Hill fell victim to its reliability issues at the French Grand Prix, held at the Le Mans Bugatti Circuit (a smaller circuit using only part of the track used for the Le Mans 24 Hours), and lost to Jack Brabham. Clark then ran out of fuel at Monza during the Italian Grand Prix. Mechanical failures cost Lotus the championship that year, but it was felt that 1968 would be a better year after Cosworth and Lotus perfected their designs, which were clearly the way forward.

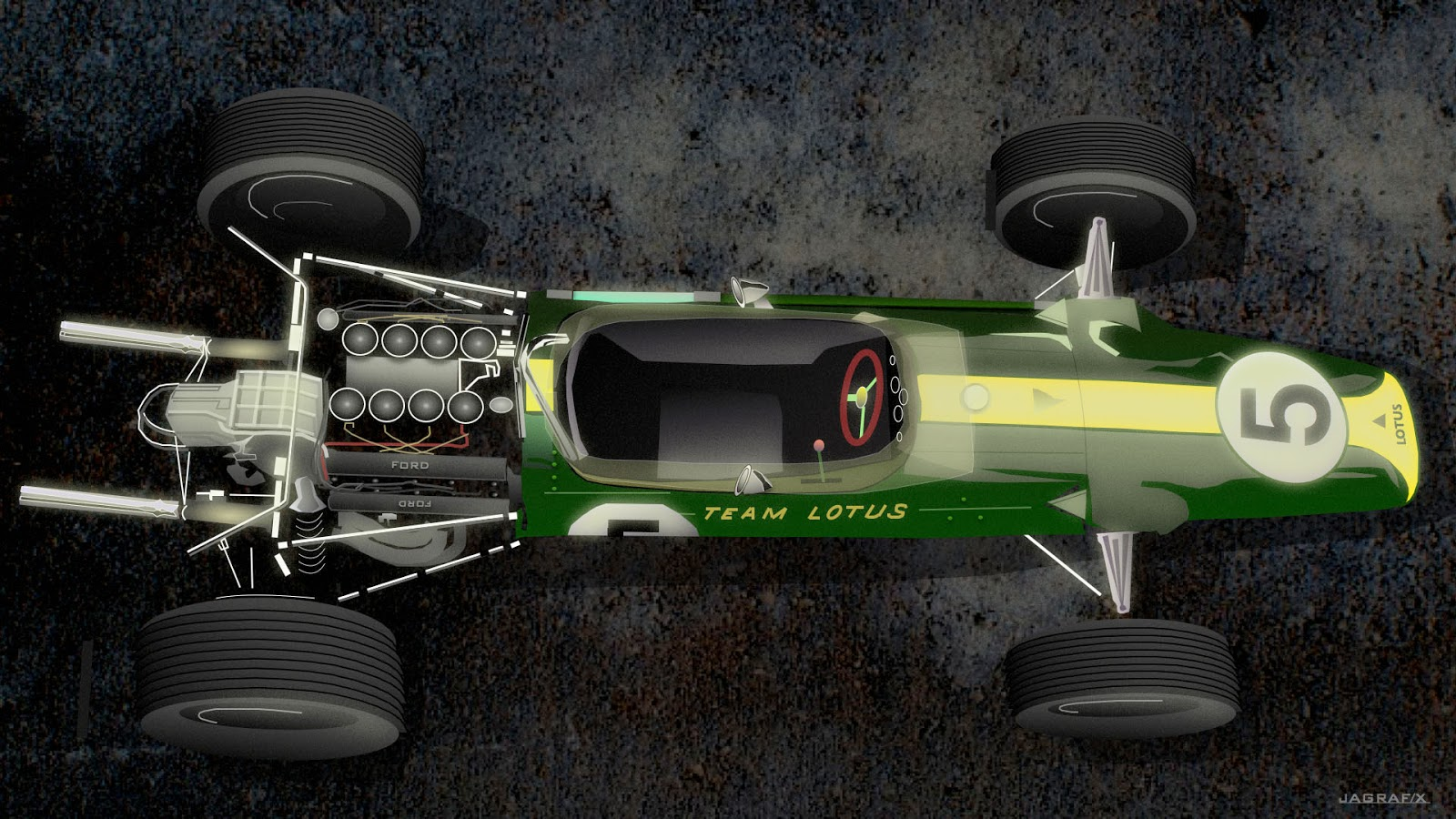
A Lotus 49 with Ford V-8 engine drawing

Clark won the first race of the 1968 season, the South African Grand Prix and the Tasman Series in Australia, but was killed in an F2 race at Hockenheim. Hill took over as team leader and won his second World Championship title, after clinching three Grand Prix wins – including the fourth of his five Monaco Grands Prix. Jo Siffert also drove a 49B, owned by Rob Walker, to win the British Grand Prix at Brands Hatch that year, the last time a car entered by a genuine privateer won a championship Formula 1 race. The 49B also took Jochen Rindt to his first victory, in 1969, at Watkins Glen, New York, before he drove the type to its last win, in the 1970 Monaco Grand Prix.

The 49B was intended to be replaced by the Lotus 63 midway through 1969, but when that car proved to be a failure, an improved version of the 49B, the 49C, was pressed into service until a suitable car could be built. The 49 took twelve wins and contributed to two drivers' and constructors' world championships, before it was replaced by the Lotus 72 during 1970. The final appearances of the 49C were in 1971, with Wilson Fittipaldi finishing ninth in the 1971 Argentine Grand Prix, and Tony Trimmer finishing sixth in the Spring Cup at Oulton Park.

Of the twelve 49s built, seven remain. Chassis R3 (driven by Hill, then sold to privateer John Love) is the only example of the original 1967 cars still in existence, and is on display at the National Motor Museum in Hampshire.

=== Tasman Series ===
The 49 also saw service in the Australia and New Zealand based Tasman Series. Fitted with a 2.5L version of the DFV dubbed the Cosworth DFW, Jim Clark drove the 49T (for Tasman) to victory in the 1968 Tasman Series, winning 4 of the 8 series races including the 1968 Australian Grand Prix. Graham Hill only drove in the 4 Australian events and still finished 4th in the series in his 49T Cosworth V8. For the 1969 Tasman Series, Jochen Rindt had replaced Clark at Lotus and while he would have wins in the Lady Wigram Trophy race in New Zealand and a masterly drive in a very wet Warwick Farm International in Australia, could only finish 2nd in the series behind the Ferrari Dino 246 Tasmania of "local" Kiwi driver Chris Amon. Reigning World Champion Hill endured much bad luck in his final Tasman Series, including retiring from the first two races in New Zealand, then the high rear wing (which he was never a fan of) collapsing during the Australian Grand Prix, as well as soaked electrics at Warwick Farm which saw him finish 11th and last (though the team dried the electrics sufficiently enough for Hill to go out and set the races fastest lap before the end).

Jim Clark noted in 1968 that the lower power of the 2.5L Tasman DFW (~360 bhp (268 kW; 365 PS) compared to the DFV's 420 bhp (313 kW; 426 PS) at the time) was not suited to the full size Lotus 49T as it lacked the top end power of the Formula One engine. This was seen to effect when he won the Surfers Paradise round and the Australian Grand Prix at the Sandown Raceway in Melbourne, both noted power circuits. Despite winning, both times he was pushed hard by Chris Amon in the Ferrari with its Formula 2 chassis and lighter V6 engine that only produced around 285 bhp (213 kW; 289 PS) (Clark and Amon produced the closest finishing margin in Australian Grand Prix history with the Scot winning by just 0.1 seconds).

The 1968 Australian Grand Prix and the 1968 Tasman Series were Clark's last wins before his death at Hockenheim.

== Complete Formula One results ==
=== Championship results ===
(key) (results in bold indicate pole position; results in italics indicate fastest lap)

Year	Chassis	Entrant	Tyres	Driver	1	2	3	4	5	6	7	8	9	10	11	12	13	Points^{†}	WCC^{†}
1967	Lotus 49	Team Lotus	F		RSA	MON	NED	BEL	FRA	GBR	GER	CAN	ITA	USA	MEX			**44**	**2nd**
1967	Lotus 49	Team Lotus	F	Jim Clark			1	**6**	Ret	**1**	**Ret**	**Ret**	**3**	1	**1**			**44**	**2nd**
1967	Lotus 49	Team Lotus	F	Graham Hill			**Ret**	Ret	**Ret**	Ret	Ret	4	Ret	**2**	Ret			**44**	**2nd**
1967	Lotus 49	Team Lotus	F	Eppie Wietzes								DSQ						**44**	**2nd**
1967	Lotus 49	Team Lotus	F	Giancarlo Baghetti									Ret					**44**	**2nd**
1967	Lotus 49	Team Lotus	F	Moises Solana										Ret	Ret			**44**	**2nd**
1968	^{§}Lotus 49; Lotus 49B	Team Lotus	F		RSA	ESP	MON	BEL	NED	FRA	GBR	GER	ITA	CAN	USA	MEX		**62**	**1st**
1968	^{§}Lotus 49; Lotus 49B	Team Lotus	F	Jim Clark	**1**^{§}													**62**	**1st**
1968	^{§}Lotus 49; Lotus 49B	Team Lotus	F	Graham Hill	2^{§}													**62**	**1st**
1968	^{§}Lotus 49; Lotus 49B	Gold Leaf Team Lotus	F	Graham Hill		1^{§}	**1**	Ret	9	Ret	**Ret**	2	Ret	4	2	1		**62**	**1st**
1968	^{§}Lotus 49; Lotus 49B	Gold Leaf Team Lotus	F	Jackie Oliver			Ret^{§}	5	NC	DNS	Ret	11	Ret	Ret	DNS	3		**62**	**1st**
1968	^{§}Lotus 49; Lotus 49B	Gold Leaf Team Lotus	F	Mario Andretti									DNS		**Ret**			**62**	**1st**
1968	^{§}Lotus 49; Lotus 49B	Gold Leaf Team Lotus	F	Bill Brack										Ret				**62**	**1st**
1968	^{§}Lotus 49; Lotus 49B	Gold Leaf Team Lotus	F	Moises Solana												Ret		**62**	**1st**
1968	^{§}Lotus 49; Lotus 49B	Rob Walker/Jack Durlacher Racing	F	Jo Siffert		Ret^{§}	Ret^{§}	7^{§}	Ret^{§}	11^{§}	1	Ret	Ret	Ret	5	**6**		**62**	**1st**
1969	^{§}Lotus 49; Lotus 49B	Gold Leaf Team Lotus	F		RSA	ESP	MON	NED	FRA	GBR	GER	ITA	CAN	USA	MEX			**42**	**3rd**
1969	^{§}Lotus 49; Lotus 49B	Gold Leaf Team Lotus	F	Graham Hill	2	Ret	1	7	6	7	4	9	Ret	Ret				**42**	**3rd**
1969	^{§}Lotus 49; Lotus 49B	Gold Leaf Team Lotus	F	Jochen Rindt	Ret	**Ret**		**Ret**	Ret	**4**	Ret	**2**	3	**1**	Ret			**42**	**3rd**
1969	^{§}Lotus 49; Lotus 49B	Gold Leaf Team Lotus	F	Mario Andretti	Ret													**42**	**3rd**
1969	^{§}Lotus 49; Lotus 49B	Gold Leaf Team Lotus	F	Richard Attwood			4											**42**	**3rd**
1969	^{§}Lotus 49; Lotus 49B	Rob Walker/Jack Durlacher Racing	F	Jo Siffert	4	Ret	3	2	9	8	11^{‡}	8	Ret	Ret	Ret			**42**	**3rd**
1969	^{§}Lotus 49; Lotus 49B	Ecurie Bonnier	F	Jo Bonnier							Ret							**42**	**3rd**
1969	^{§}Lotus 49; Lotus 49B	Team Gunston	D	John Love	Ret^{§}													**42**	**3rd**
1969	^{§}Lotus 49; Lotus 49B	Pete Lovely Volkswagen Inc.	F	Pete Lovely									7	Ret	9			**42**	**3rd**
1970	^{§}Lotus 49^{¶}Lotus 49B; Lotus 49C	Gold Leaf Team Lotus; Garvey Team Lotus; World Wide Racing	F		RSA	ESP	MON	BEL	NED	FRA	GBR	GER	AUT	ITA	CAN	USA	MEX	**59**^{^}	**1st**^{^}
1970	^{§}Lotus 49^{¶}Lotus 49B; Lotus 49C	Gold Leaf Team Lotus; Garvey Team Lotus; World Wide Racing	F	Jochen Rindt	13		1	Ret										**59**^{^}	**1st**^{^}
1970	^{§}Lotus 49^{¶}Lotus 49B; Lotus 49C	Gold Leaf Team Lotus; Garvey Team Lotus; World Wide Racing	F	John Miles	5		DNQ											**59**^{^}	**1st**^{^}
1970	^{§}Lotus 49^{¶}Lotus 49B; Lotus 49C	Gold Leaf Team Lotus; Garvey Team Lotus; World Wide Racing	F	Alex Soler-Roig		DNQ				DNQ								**59**^{^}	**1st**^{^}
1970	^{§}Lotus 49^{¶}Lotus 49B; Lotus 49C	Gold Leaf Team Lotus; Garvey Team Lotus; World Wide Racing	F	Emerson Fittipaldi							8	4	15					**59**^{^}	**1st**^{^}
1970	^{§}Lotus 49^{¶}Lotus 49B; Lotus 49C	R.R.C. Walker Racing; Brooke Bond Oxo Racing/Rob Walker	F	Graham Hill	6	4	5	Ret	NC	10	6	Ret						**59**^{^}	**1st**^{^}
1970	^{§}Lotus 49^{¶}Lotus 49B; Lotus 49C	R.R.C. Walker Racing; Brooke Bond Oxo Racing/Rob Walker	F	Brian Redman	DNS													**59**^{^}	**1st**^{^}
1970	^{§}Lotus 49^{¶}Lotus 49B; Lotus 49C	Scuderia Scribante	F	Dave Charlton	12													**59**^{^}	**1st**^{^}
1970	^{§}Lotus 49^{¶}Lotus 49B; Lotus 49C	Team Gunston	D	John Love	8^{§}													**59**^{^}	**1st**^{^}
1970	^{§}Lotus 49^{¶}Lotus 49B; Lotus 49C	Pete Lovely Volkswagen Inc.	F	Pete Lovely					DNQ^{¶}	DNQ^{¶}	NC^{¶}					DNQ^{¶}		**59**^{^}	**1st**^{^}

^{†} Points were awarded on a 9-6-4-3-2-1 basis to the first six finishers at each round, but only the best placed car for each make was eligible to score points. The best five results from the first six rounds and the best four results from the last five rounds were retained in 1967 and 1969, five from the first six and five from the last six in 1968, and the best six results from the first seven rounds and the best five from the last six rounds were retained in 1970.
^{‡} Formula Two cars occupied fifth to tenth positions in the 1969 German Grand Prix, but were not eligible for championship points. The points for fifth and sixth were awarded to the drivers of the eleventh and twelfth placed cars.
^{^} Total points scored by all Lotus-Ford cars, including 45 points scored by drivers of Lotus 72 variants.

=== Non-Championship results ===
(key) (results in bold indicate pole position; results in italics indicate fastest lap)

Year	Chassis	Entrant	Tyres	Driver	1	2	3	4	5	6	7	8
1967	Lotus 49	Team Lotus	F		ROC	SPC	INT	SYR	OUL	ESP		
1967	Lotus 49	Team Lotus	F	Jim Clark						**1**		
1967	Lotus 49	Team Lotus	F	Graham Hill						2		
1968	Lotus 49	Gold Leaf Team Lotus	F		ROC	INT	OUL					
1968	Lotus 49	Gold Leaf Team Lotus	F	Graham Hill	Ret	Ret						
1968	Lotus 49B	Gold Leaf Team Lotus	F	Graham Hill			Ret					
1968	Lotus 49B	Gold Leaf Team Lotus	F	Jackie Oliver			3					
1968	Lotus 49	Rob Walker/Jack Durlacher Racing	F	Jo Siffert	DNS	Ret						
1969	Lotus 49B	Gold Leaf Team Lotus	F		ROC	INT	MAD	OUL				
1969	Lotus 49B	Gold Leaf Team Lotus	F	Graham Hill	**2**	7						
1969	Lotus 49B	Gold Leaf Team Lotus	F	Jochen Rindt	Ret	2						
1969	Lotus 49B	Rob Walker/Jack Durlacher Racing	F	Jo Siffert	4	11						
1969	Lotus 49B	Pete Lovely Volkswagen Inc.	F	Pete Lovely	6	Ret						
1969	Lotus 49B	Ecurie Bonnier	F	Jo Bonnier				DNS				
1970	Lotus 49C	Gold Leaf Team Lotus	F		ROC	INT	OUL					
1970	Lotus 49C	Gold Leaf Team Lotus	F	Jochen Rindt	2							
1970	Lotus 49C	R.R.C. Walker Racing; Brooke Bond Oxo Racing/Rob Walker	F	Graham Hill	5	9						
1970	Lotus 49B	Pete Lovely Volkswagen Inc.	F	Pete Lovely	Ret	13						
1971	Lotus 49C	Gold Leaf Team Lotus	F		ARG	ROC	QUE	SPR	INT	RIN	OUL	VIC
1971	Lotus 49C	Gold Leaf Team Lotus	F	Wilson Fittipaldi	Ret							
1971	Lotus 49C	Gold Leaf Team Lotus	F	Tony Trimmer				NC				
1971	Lotus 49B	Pete Lovely Volkswagen Inc.	F	Pete Lovely			DNQ					

== Racing colours ==
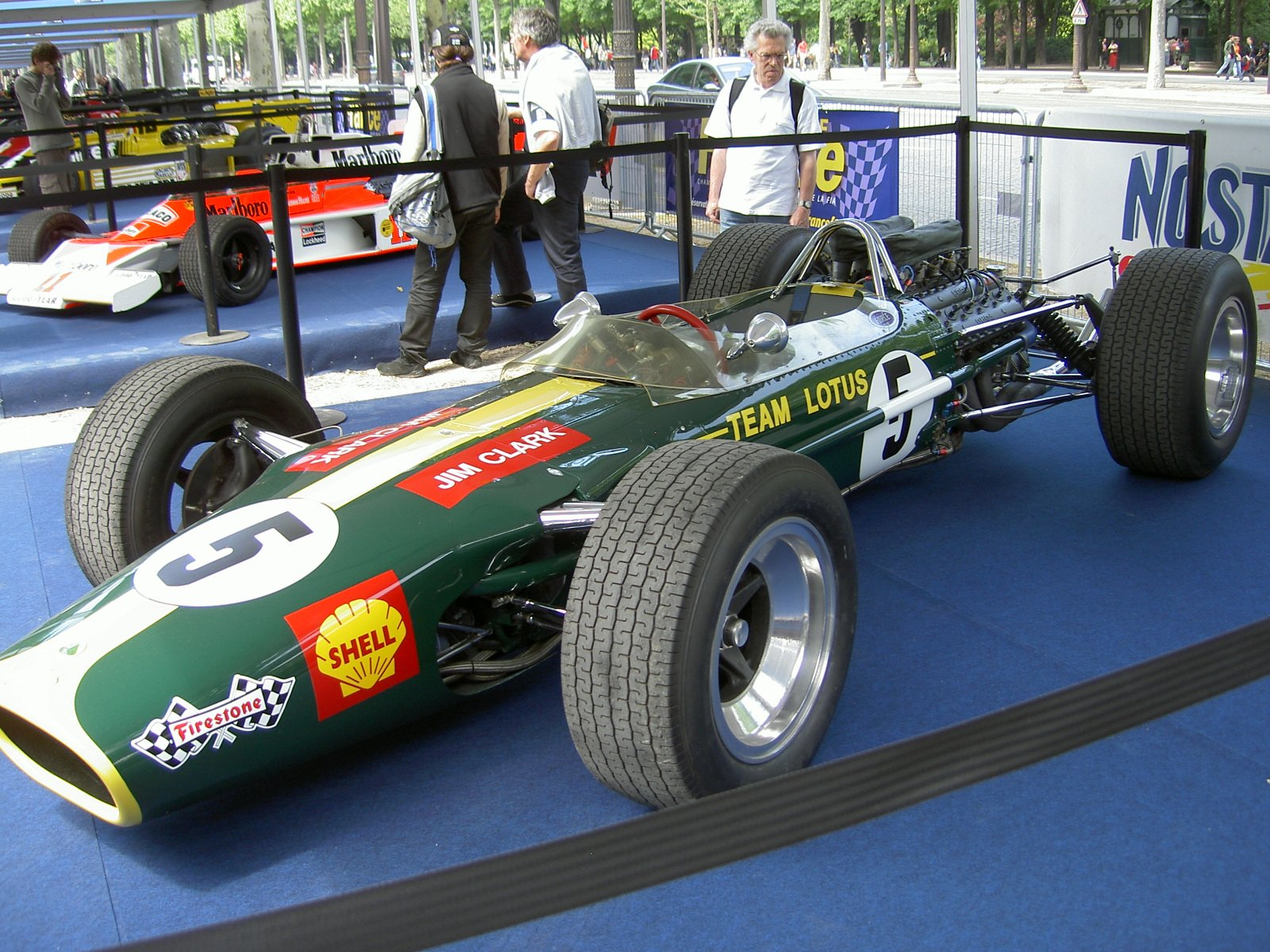
A Lotus 49 presented as it would have appeared in the early part of the 1968 season, just prior to the introduction of Gold Leaf Team Lotus colours

From its introduction in 1967 works Lotus 49s were painted in Lotus's traditional British racing green with yellow centre-stripe. Over the following 16 months the design gained increasing numbers of sponsor patches and large driver name strips, while retaining the traditional base scheme. However, for the 1967-1968 Tasman Series races Team Lotus's 2.5 litre engined 49s were painted red, cream and gold – the colours of Gold Leaf cigarettes – after Chapman signed a lucrative sponsorship deal. This colour scheme was introduced for the 1968 World Championship at the second race of the season, the 1968 Spanish Grand Prix, making Lotus the first works team (second only to Team Gunston entering a private Brabham car at the 1968 South African Grand Prix) to paint their cars in the livery of their sponsors.

Lotus 49s were also run by the Scottish privateer Rob Walker Racing Team, who painted their car in the Scottish national racing colours (dark blue with white nose band), and the American privateer Pete Lovely team, whose car (chassis R11) was painted in the American national racing colours of white with a blue centre-stripe.

== Legacy ==
The Lotus 49 was the first Formula One car powered by the Cosworth DFV engine that would power most of the Formula One grid through the 1970s. Since then, it was one of the most competitive cars in F1 history.

The Lotus 49 appears in numerous video games including iRacing, Forza Motorsport, Assetto Corsa, Project CARS, TOCA Race Driver 3 Challenge and Formula One Championship Edition.

Tamiya released a 1/12 scale model kit of the car as well the B-spec counterpart. A version made by Ebbro are also available.

Hot Wheels released a 1/64 scale die-cast version of the car with a driver inside. A larger 1/18 scale version was made by Exoto.

== Gallery ==
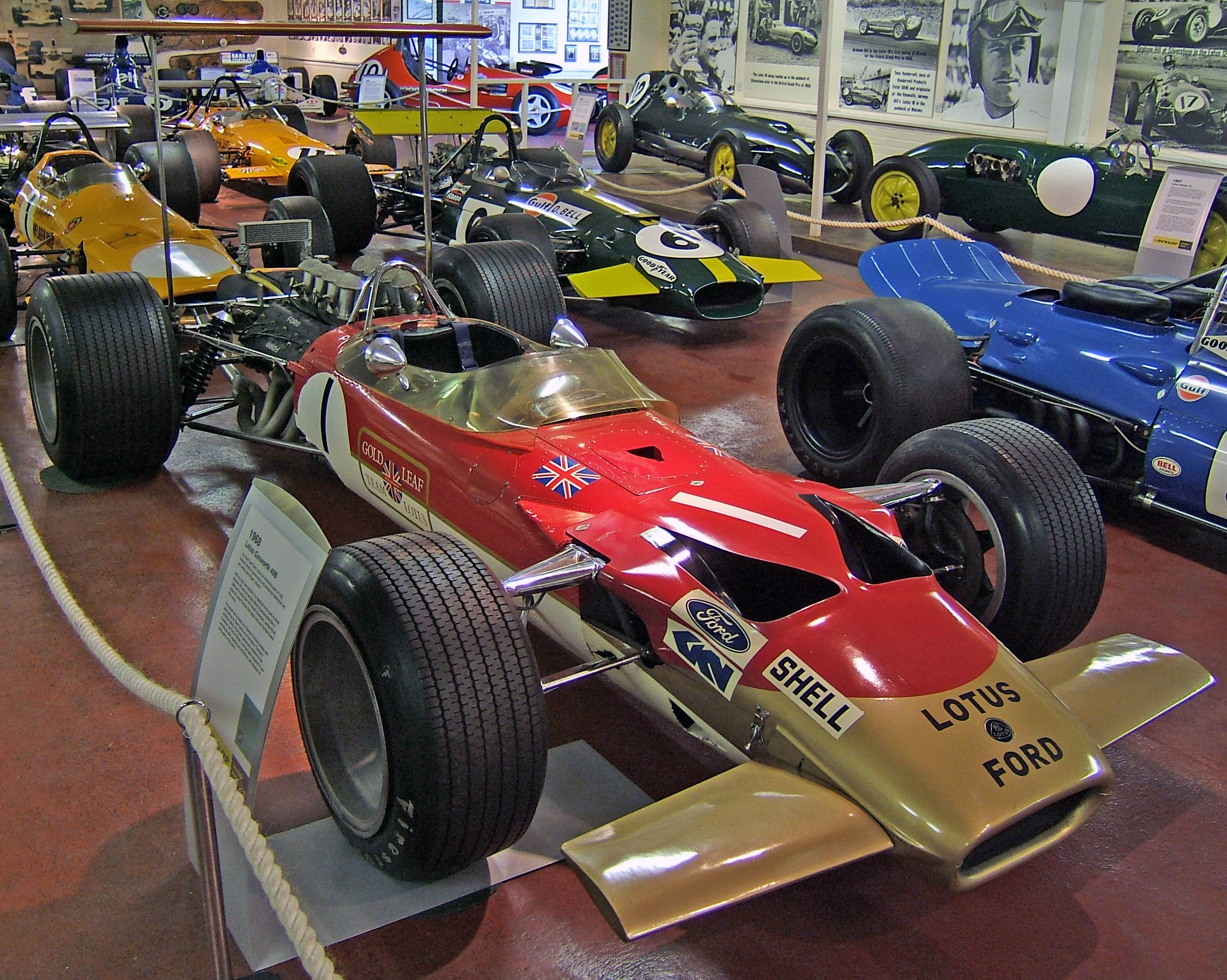
Lotus 49B

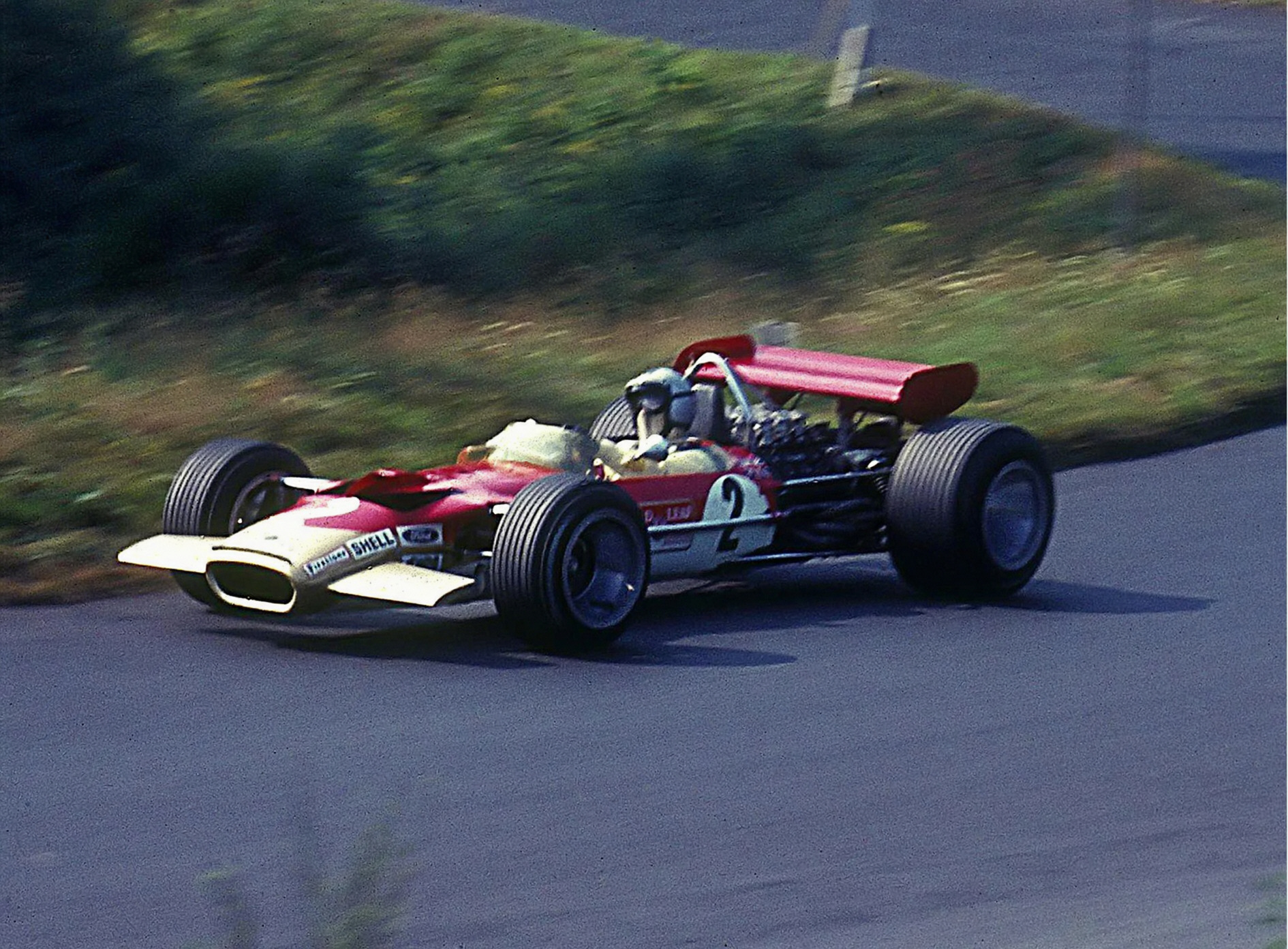
Jochen Rindt at the 1969 German Grand Prix

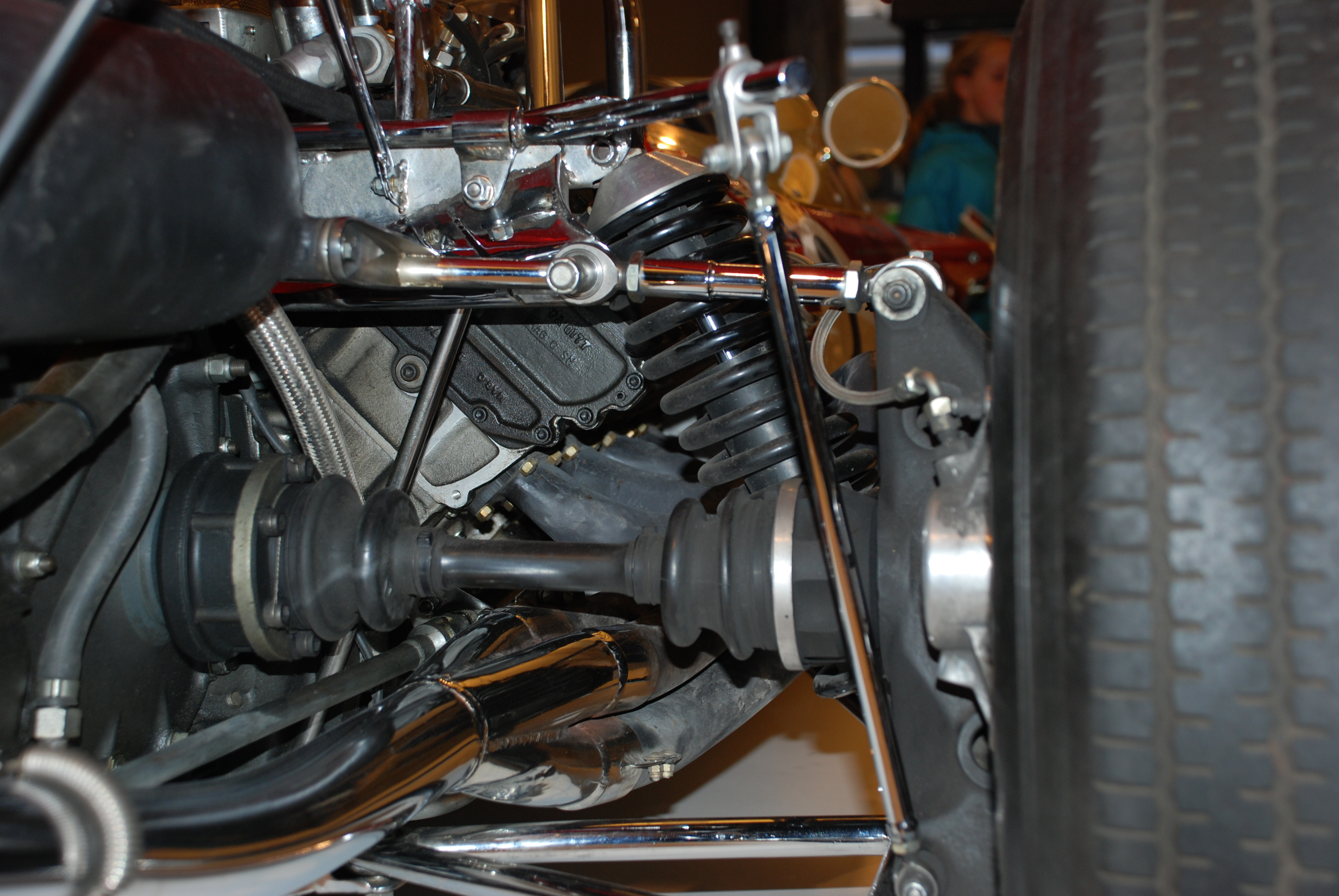
rear suspension of the Lotus 49B

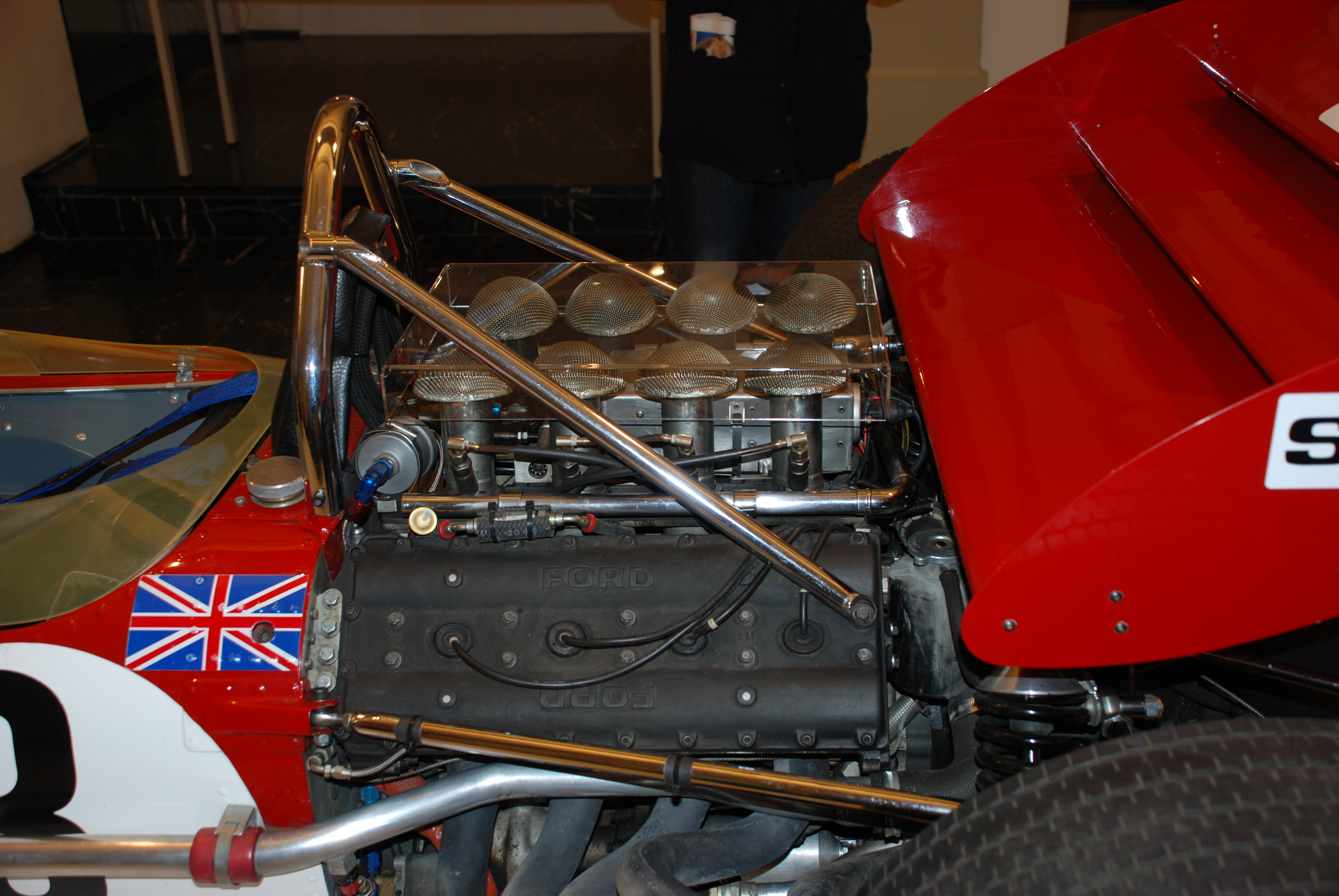
Cosworth-V8 in the Lotus 49B

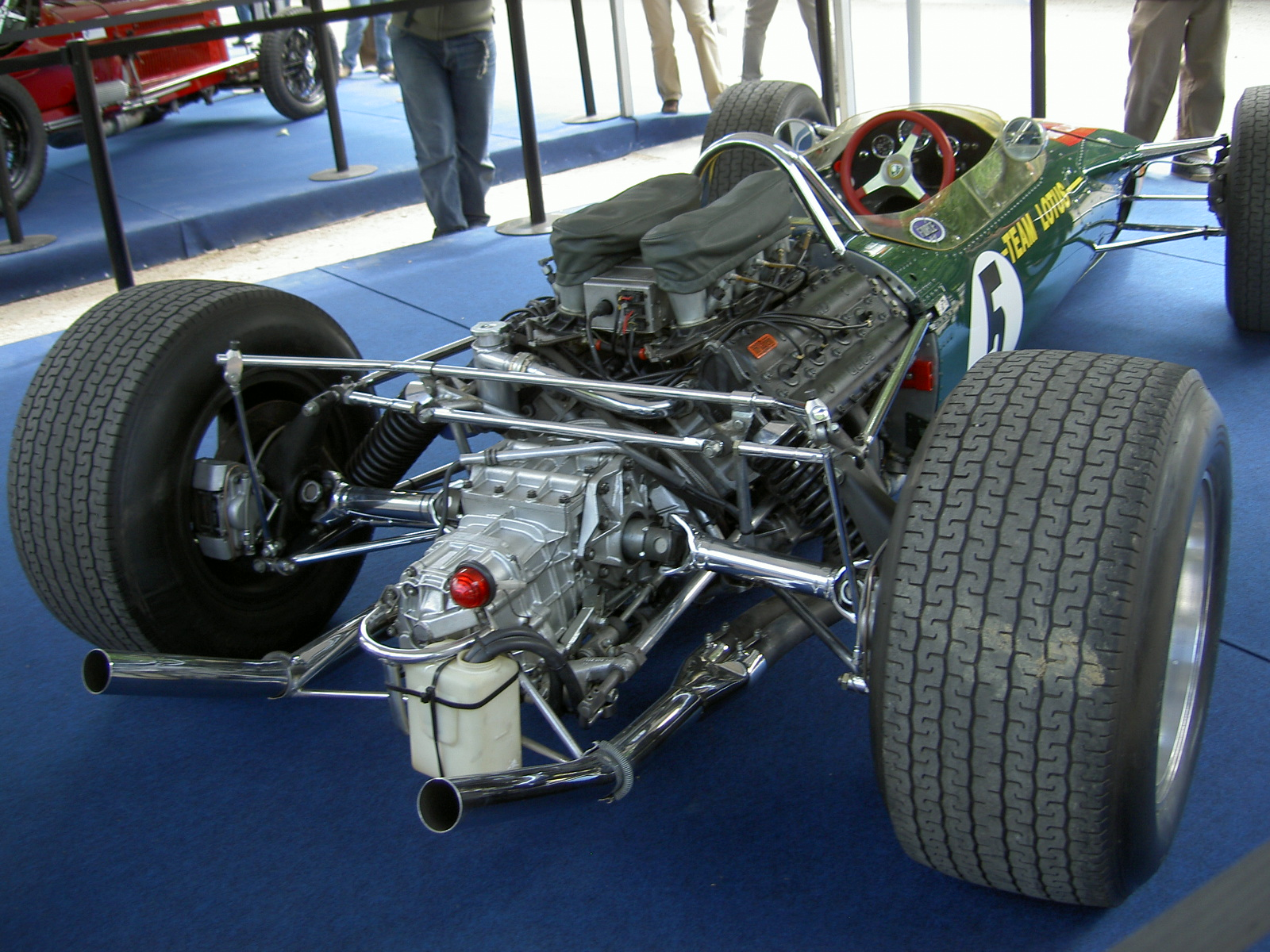
The Cosworth DFV engine as installed into an early-1968 spec Lotus 49

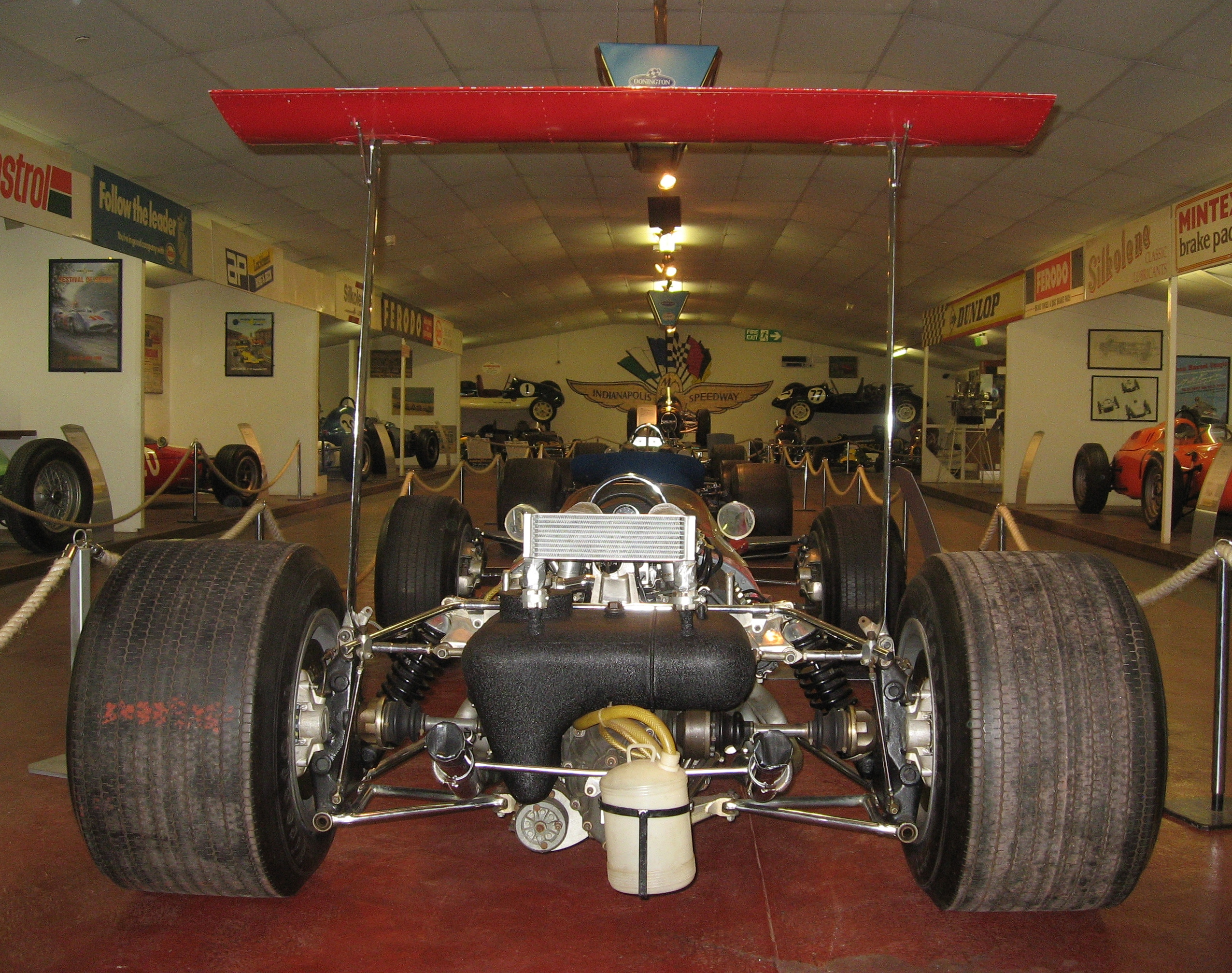
View of Lotus 49B showing high rear wing fixed directly to suspension

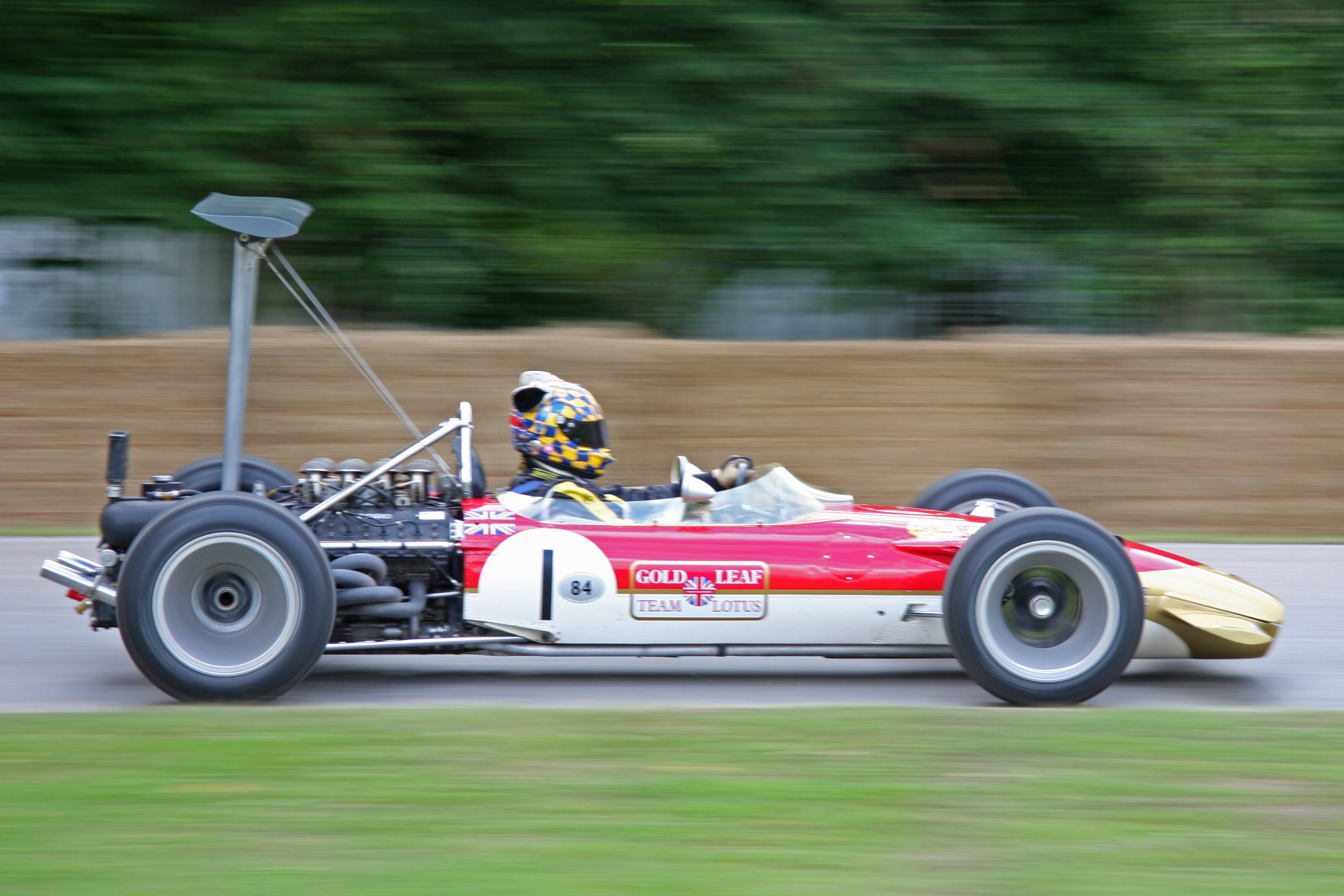
A Lotus 49B with the original, banned rear wing being demonstrated at the 2008 Goodwood Festival of Speed

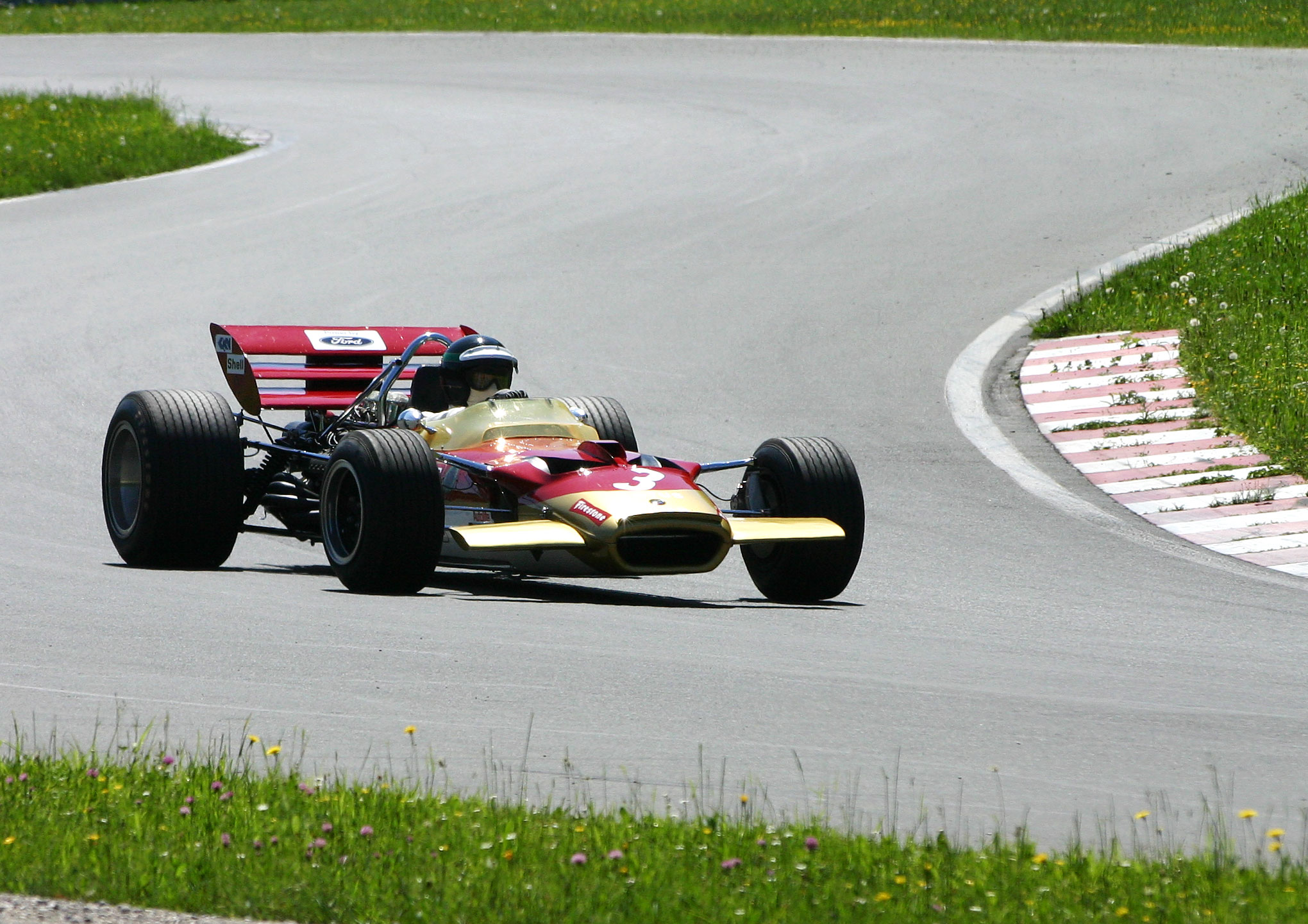
The 49C being demonstrated in 2005

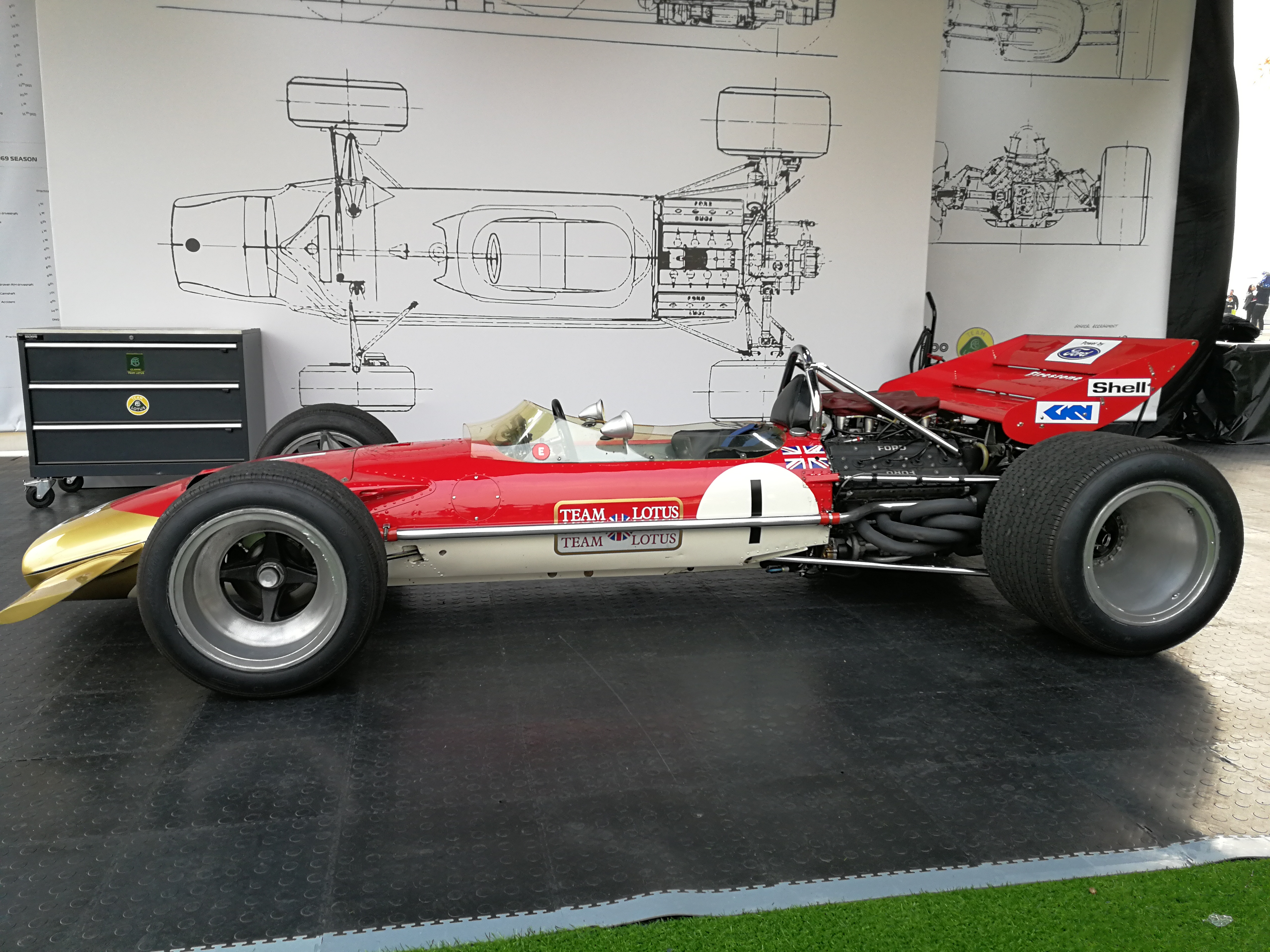
Graham Hill's 1968 Monaco GP winning Lotus 49B (Chassis R10) on display during 2019 Chinese Grand Prix
