= Mike Costin =

Co-founder of Cosworth and former Lotus engineer

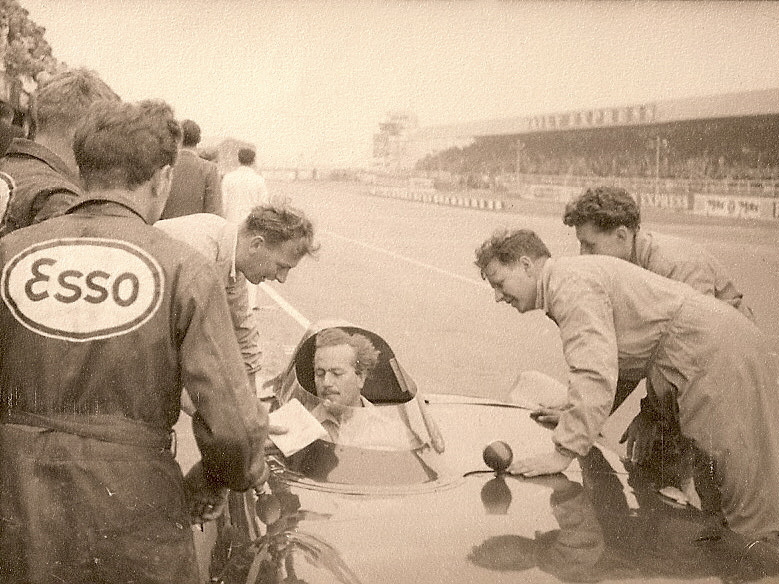
British Grand Prix, Formula 2 Race, Silverstone July 1956. Lotus Development Director Mike Costin on left holding notes. Colin Chapman in Lotus Eleven. Chief Mechanic John Crosthwaite on right leaning on car

Michael Charles Costin (born 10 July 1929, in Hendon) is a British engineer. Together with Keith Duckworth, he co-founded Cosworth Engineering, a producer of Ford-funded and sponsored engines. Drivers including Graham Hill, Jackie Stewart, Jochen Rindt, Emerson Fittipaldi, James Hunt, Mario Andretti, Alan Jones, Nelson Piquet, and Keke Rosberg won the Formula One World Championship using Cosworth DFV engines during the 1960s, 1970s and 1980s.

He was educated at Salvatorian College in Wealdstone and then apprenticed at De Havilland. In 1953 he started at Lotus, initially helping out on a part-time basis. Keith Duckworth joined Lotus in 1957 and they founded Cosworth Engineering in 1958. He later described himself as having "studied for 40 years at the University of Duckworth".

Duckworth was CEO of Cosworth until retiring, for health reasons, in 1988; Costin took over as CEO until he retired in 1990. As of 2005, Costin was still involved in racing, as a consultant to the Triumph motorbike company.

Mike Costin is the younger brother of Frank Costin, an aerodynamics and race car designer for Lotus, Lister and Maserati, and co-founder of Marcos Cars.
