= BRM P67 =

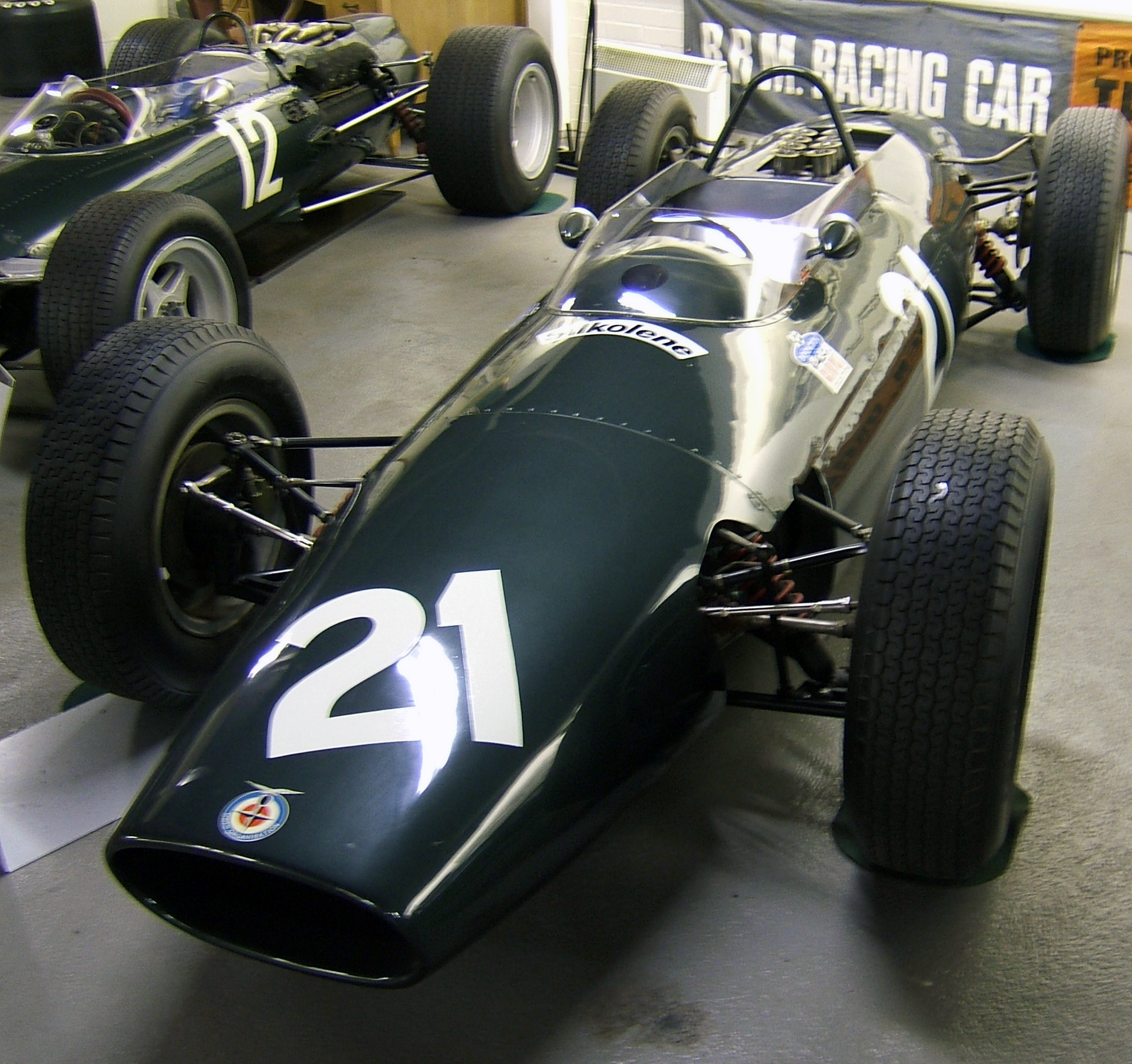
- Category: Formula One
- Constructor: British Racing Motors
- Designer: Tony Rudd
- Predecessor: P261
- Successor: P83

Technical specifications
- Chassis: Duralumin monocoque
- Suspension (front): Double wishbone, with inboard spring/damper units
- Suspension (rear): Double wishbone, with outboard coilover spring/damper units
- Axle track: F: 54 in (1,372 mm) (adj.); R: 53 in (1,346 mm) (adj.)
- Wheelbase: 91 in (2,311 mm) (adjustable)
- Engine: BRM P56 1,498 cc (91.4 cu in) V8 Naturally aspirated mid-mounted
- Transmission: BRM P72 6-speed manual
- Weight: 525 kg (1,157.4 lb)
- Fuel: Shell
- Tyres: Dunlop

Competition history
- Notable entrants: Owen Racing Organisation
- Notable drivers: (United Kingdom) Richard Attwood
- Debut: 1964 British Grand Prix
Races	Wins	Poles	F/Laps
1	0	0	0
- Constructors' Championships: 0
- Drivers' Championships: 0
- Unless otherwise stated, all data refer to Formula One World Championship Grands Prix only.

The BRM P67 was an experimental Formula One car, designed by Tony Rudd and built by the British Racing Motors team in Bourne, Lincolnshire, England, for the 1964 Formula One season.

== Development ==
After Ferguson withdrew from racing they offered their 4WD technology to any F1 manufacturer who was interested and, with the approaching switch to 3.0-litre engines in 1966 in mind, BRM decided to try it out. The resulting car consisted of the chassis of a BRM P261, the suspension of a P57, a 1.5-litre BRM P56 engine mounted back-to-front and Ferguson's transmission system, all put together by BRM apprentice Mike Pilbeam, who was later to find fame as a constructor of hillclimb cars.

== Race history ==
The P67 was entered for the 1964 British Grand Prix with Richard Attwood driving, but after qualifying last, BRM withdrew the car from the race. Thereafter BRM put their 4WD programme in mothballs, to concentrate on their complicated H16 engine, although this engine was built with room for a second driveshaft to pass through the engine should 4WD become the way to go.

It was apt, given its designer, that the P67 itself was later used extensively in hillclimbs, as the Ferguson P99 had been before it, being driven by David Good in 1967 with a bigger 2-litre engine. After some tuning to the Ferguson transmission's torque distribution it proved extremely successful in this field, Peter Lawson winning the British championship with ease in 1968.
