= 1970 European Formula Two Championship =

1970 European Formula Two season

Seasons
- ← 1969 1971 →

The 1970 European Formula Two season was contested over 8 rounds. Tecno Racing Team driver Clay Regazzoni clinched the championship title.

== Teams and drivers ==
| Entrant | Constructor | Chassis | Engine | Tyre | Driver | Rounds |
|---|---|---|---|---|---|---|
| (United Kingdom) John Coombs | Brabham-Ford | BT30 | Ford Cosworth FVA 1.6 L4 | D G | (United Kingdom) Jackie Stewart | 1 |
| (United Kingdom) John Coombs | Brabham-Ford | BT30 | Ford Cosworth FVA 1.6 L4 | D G | (Australia) Jack Brabham | 4, 6 |
| (United Kingdom) Sports Motor International (United Kingdom) Team Brabham | Brabham-Ford | BT30 | Ford Cosworth FVA 1.6 L4 | F | (France) François Mazet | 1–4, 6 |
| (United Kingdom) Sports Motor International (United Kingdom) Team Brabham | Brabham-Ford | BT30 | Ford Cosworth FVA 1.6 L4 | F | (Australia) Tim Schenken | 1–4, 6–7 |
| (United Kingdom) Sports Motor International (United Kingdom) Team Brabham | Brabham-Ford | BT30 | Ford Cosworth FVA 1.6 L4 | F | (United Kingdom) Gerry Birrell | 7 |
| (United Kingdom) FIRST | Brabham-Ford | BT30 | Ford Cosworth FVA 1.6 L4 | F | (United Kingdom) Peter Westbury | All |
| (United Kingdom) Alistair Walker Racing | Brabham-Ford | BT30; BT23C | Ford Cosworth FVA 1.6 L4 | F | (United Kingdom) Robin Widdows | 1–3 |
| (United Kingdom) Alistair Walker Racing | Brabham-Ford | BT30; BT23C | Ford Cosworth FVA 1.6 L4 | F | (United Kingdom) Alistair Walker | 1, 6–8 |
| (United Kingdom) Wheatcroft Racing | Brabham-Ford | BT30 | Ford Cosworth FVA 1.6 L4 | F | (United Kingdom) Derek Bell | All |
| (United Kingdom) John Watson | Brabham-Ford | BT30 | Ford Cosworth FVA 1.6 L4 | F | (United Kingdom) John Watson | 1–4 |
| (United Kingdom) Bob Gerard Racing | Brabham-Ford | BT30 | Ford Cosworth FVA 1.6 L4 | F | (United Kingdom) Peter Gaydon | 1–2 |
| (United Kingdom) Bob Gerard Racing | Brabham-Ford | BT30 | Ford Cosworth FVA 1.6 L4 | F | (France) Henri Pescarolo | 3–4 |
| (Republic of Ireland) Irish Racing Cars | Brabham-Ford | BT30 | Ford Cosworth FVA 1.6 L4 | ? | (United Kingdom) Tommy Reid | 1 |
| (Italy) Scuderia Picchio Rosso (Italy) North Italian Racing Developments (Italy) Scuderia Ala d'Oro | Brabham-Ford | BT23; BT30 | Ford Cosworth FVA 1.6 L4 | F | (Italy) Vittorio Brambilla | 1, 3, 5–8 |
| (Italy) Scuderia Picchio Rosso (Italy) North Italian Racing Developments (Italy) Scuderia Ala d'Oro | Brabham-Ford | BT23; BT30 | Ford Cosworth FVA 1.6 L4 | F | (Italy) Enzo Corti | 2–3 |
| (Italy) Scuderia Picchio Rosso (Italy) North Italian Racing Developments (Italy) Scuderia Ala d'Oro | Brabham-Ford | BT23; BT30 | Ford Cosworth FVA 1.6 L4 | F | (Italy) Ernesto Brambilla | 5–8 |
| (Italy) Scuderia Picchio Rosso (Italy) North Italian Racing Developments (Italy) Scuderia Ala d'Oro | Ferrari | Dino 166 F2 | Ferrari Dino 166 1.6 V6 | F | (Italy) Ernesto Brambilla | 1, 3 |
| (West Germany) Mountain Racing Team | Brabham-Ford | BT23; BT30; BT23C | Ford Cosworth FVA 1.6 L4 | ? | (West Germany) Helmut Gall | 1–2 |
| (West Germany) Mountain Racing Team | Brabham-Ford | BT23; BT30; BT23C | Ford Cosworth FVA 1.6 L4 | ? | (West Germany) Werner Lindermann | 1–2 |
| (West Germany) Eifelland Wohnwagenbau | Brabham-Ford | BT23C; BT30 | Ford Cosworth FVA 1.6 L4 | F | (West Germany) Bernd Terbeck | 1–2, 7–8 |
| (West Germany) Eifelland Wohnwagenbau | Brabham-Ford | BT23C; BT30 | Ford Cosworth FVA 1.6 L4 | F | (West Germany) Rolf Stommelen | 5–7 |
| (West Germany) Eifelland Wohnwagenbau | Brabham-Ford | BT23C; BT30 | Ford Cosworth FVA 1.6 L4 | F | (West Germany) Hermann Unold | 8 |
| (West Germany) Eifelland Wohnwagenbau | March-Ford | 702 | Ford Cosworth FVA 1.6 L4 | F | (West Germany) Rolf Stommelen | 1–3 |
| (West Germany) Eifelland Wohnwagenbau | March-Ford | 702 | Ford Cosworth FVA 1.6 L4 | F | (West Germany) Hannelore Werner | 8 |
| (Republic of Ireland) Brian Cullen Racing | Brabham-Ford | BT23C | Ford Cosworth FVA 1.6 L4 | D | (Republic of Ireland) Brian Cullen | 1, 3, 5, 7–8 |
| (United Kingdom) Team Bardahl (United Kingdom) Lotus Components | Lotus-Ford | 69 | Ford Cosworth FVA 1.6 L4 | F | (Brazil) Emerson Fittipaldi | 1–5, 7–8 |
| (United Kingdom) Jochen Rindt Racing | Lotus-Ford | 69 | Ford Cosworth FVA 1.6 L4 | F | (Austria) Jochen Rindt | 1–2, 4 |
| (United Kingdom) Jochen Rindt Racing | Lotus-Ford | 69 | Ford Cosworth FVA 1.6 L4 | F | (United Kingdom) John Miles | 2 |
| (United Kingdom) Jochen Rindt Racing | Lotus-Ford | 69 | Ford Cosworth FVA 1.6 L4 | F | (Spain) Alex Soler-Roig | 3 |
| (United Kingdom) Jochen Rindt Racing | Lotus-Ford | 69 | Ford Cosworth FVA 1.6 L4 | F | (Spain) Eugenio Baturone | 3 |
| (United Kingdom) Jochen Rindt Racing | Lotus-Ford | 69 | Ford Cosworth FVA 1.6 L4 | F | (United Kingdom) Graham Hill | 4 |
| (United Kingdom) Tetsu Ikuzawa Racing Partnership | Lotus-Ford | 69 | Ford Cosworth FVA 1.6 L4 | F | (Japan) Tetsu Ikuzawa | 1–2, 4, 6–8 |
| (West Germany) Bayerische Motoren Werke | BMW | 270; 269 | BMW M11 1.6 L4 | D | (Switzerland) Jo Siffert | 1, 4–7 |
| (West Germany) Bayerische Motoren Werke | BMW | 270; 269 | BMW M11 1.6 L4 | D | (Austria) Dieter Quester | 1, 3–8 |
| (West Germany) Bayerische Motoren Werke | BMW | 270; 269 | BMW M11 1.6 L4 | D | (Belgium) Jacky Ickx | 1, 4–7 |
| (West Germany) Bayerische Motoren Werke | BMW | 270; 269 | BMW M11 1.6 L4 | D | (West Germany) Hubert Hahne | 1–5 |
| (West Germany) Bayerische Motoren Werke | BMW | 270; 269 | BMW M11 1.6 L4 | D | (West Germany) Dieter Basche | 7–8 |
| (West Germany) Bayerische Motoren Werke | BMW | 270; 269 | BMW M11 1.6 L4 | D | (United Kingdom) Derek Bell | 8 |
| (Switzerland) Squadra Tartaruga | March-Ford | 702 | Ford Cosworth FVA 1.6 L4 | F | (Switzerland) Xavier Perrot | 1–3, 6, 8 |
| (United Kingdom) Malcolm Guthrie Racing | March-Ford | 702 | Ford Cosworth FVA 1.6 L4 | F | (New Zealand) Chris Amon | 1 |
| (United Kingdom) Malcolm Guthrie Racing | March-Ford | 702 | Ford Cosworth FVA 1.6 L4 | F | (United Kingdom) Malcolm Guthrie | 1–4, 7–8 |
| (United Kingdom) Malcolm Guthrie Racing | March-Ford | 702 | Ford Cosworth FVA 1.6 L4 | F | (Sweden) Ronnie Peterson | 2–4, 6–8 |
| (Italy) Tecno Racing Team | Tecno-Ford | 69; 70; 68; 71 | Ford Cosworth FVA 1.6 L4 | F | (Switzerland) Clay Regazzoni | All |
| (Italy) Tecno Racing Team | Tecno-Ford | 69; 70; 68; 71 | Ford Cosworth FVA 1.6 L4 | F | (France) François Cevert | 2–8 |
| (Italy) Tecno Racing Team | Tecno-Ford | 69; 70; 68; 71 | Ford Cosworth FVA 1.6 L4 | F | (Italy) Giancarlo Gagliardi | 3 |
| (Italy) Tecno Racing Team | Tecno-Ford | 69; 70; 68; 71 | Ford Cosworth FVA 1.6 L4 | F | (Italy) Giovanni Salvati | 5 |
| (Italy) Tecno Racing Team | Tecno-Ford | 69; 70; 68; 71 | Ford Cosworth FVA 1.6 L4 | F | (France) Max Jean | 6 |
| (France) Constructions Mechaniques Pygmée | Pygmée-Ford | MDB15 | Ford Cosworth FVA 1.6 L4 | F G | (France) Patrick Dal Bo | 1, 3–5, 7 |
| (France) Constructions Mechaniques Pygmée | Pygmée-Ford | MDB15 | Ford Cosworth FVA 1.6 L4 | F G | (France) Jean-Pierre Jabouille | 1, 3–5, 7–8 |
| (France) Constructions Mechaniques Pygmée | Pygmée-Ford | MDB15 | Ford Cosworth FVA 1.6 L4 | F G | (France) Patrick Depailler | 3–5 |
| (France) Constructions Mechaniques Pygmée | Pygmée-Ford | MDB15 | Ford Cosworth FVA 1.6 L4 | F G | (France) Jean-Pierre Beltoise | 3–5, 8 |
| (Sweden) Publicator Racing | Chevron-Ford | B17C | Ford Cosworth FVA 1.6 L4 | F | (Sweden) Reine Wisell | 1, 4 |
| (United Kingdom) Paul Craven | Chevron-Ford | B17B | Ford Cosworth FVA 1.6 L4 | ? | (United Kingdom) Paul Craven | 1 |
| (United Kingdom) Robert Lamplough | Lola-Ford | T100 | Ford Cosworth FVA 1.6 L4 | F | (United Kingdom) Robert Lamplough | 1–2, 8 |
| (United Kingdom) Alan Fowler | Lotus-Ford | 48 | Ford Cosworth FVA 1.6 L4 | ? | (United Kingdom) Barrie Smith | 1 |
| (Switzerland) Midland Racing Team | Tecno-Ford | 69 | Ford Cosworth FVA 1.6 L4 | F | (Switzerland) Bruno Frey | 2, 8 |
| (Argentina) Automóvil Club Argentino | Brabham-Ford | BT30 | Ford Cosworth FVA 1.6 L4 | F | (Argentina) Benedicto Caldarella | 2–4 |
| (Argentina) Automóvil Club Argentino | Brabham-Ford | BT30 | Ford Cosworth FVA 1.6 L4 | F | (Argentina) Carlos Reutemann | 2–8 |
| (Italy) Scuderia Jolly Club | Tecno-Ford | 68 | Ford Cosworth FVA 1.6 L4 | F | (Italy) Giancarlo Gagliardi | 2 |
| (Italy) Scuderia Jolly Club | Brabham-Ford | BT30 | Ford Cosworth FVA 1.6 L4 | F | (Italy) Giancarlo Gagliardi | 5, 7 |
| (Italy) Scuderia Jolly Club | Brabham-Ford | BT30 | Ford Cosworth FVA 1.6 L4 | F | (Italy) Pino Pica | 3 |
| (Italy) Scuderia Jolly Club | Brabham-Ford | BT30 | Ford Cosworth FVA 1.6 L4 | F | (Italy) Andrea de Adamich | 4 |
| (West Germany) Roland Binder | Tecno-Ford | 68 | Ford Cosworth FVA 1.6 L4 | F | (West Germany) Roland Binder | 2, 7–8 |
| (United Kingdom) Northumbria Racing Organisation | Lotus-Ford | 59B | Ford Cosworth FVA 1.6 L4 | ? | (United Kingdom) Johnny Blades | 2–3 |
| (France) Adam Potocki Racing | Lotus-Ford | 69 | Ford Cosworth FVA 1.6 L4 | F | (France) Adam Potocki | 4–5, 7–8 |
| (United Kingdom) Motor Racing Enterprises (United Kingdom) Team Obrist | Brabham-Ford | BT30 | Ford Cosworth FVA 1.6 L4 | F | (France) Jean-Pierre Jaussaud | 4 |
| (United Kingdom) Motor Racing Enterprises (United Kingdom) Team Obrist | Brabham-Ford | BT30 | Ford Cosworth FVA 1.6 L4 | F | (United Kingdom) Richard Scott | 7–8 |
| (United Kingdom) Ecurie Ecosse | Brabham-Ford | BT30 | Ford Cosworth FVA 1.6 L4 | F | (United Kingdom) Graham Birrell | 4 |
| (United Kingdom) Ecurie Ecosse | Brabham-Ford | BT30 | Ford Cosworth FVA 1.6 L4 | F | (United Kingdom) Richard Attwood | 7 |
| (United States) Mike Goth | Brabham-Ford | BT30 | Ford Cosworth FVA 1.6 L4 | ? | (United States) Mike Goth | 7 |
| (United Kingdom) Brian Nelson | Crosslé-Ford | 18F | Ford Cosworth FVA 1.6 L4 | ? | (United Kingdom) Brian Nelson | 7 |
| (United Kingdom) Paul Watson Racing Organisation | Brabham-Ford | BT30 | Ford Cosworth FVA 1.6 L4 | F | (United States) Mike Goth | 8 |
| (United Kingdom) Johnny Blades | Lotus-Ford | 59B; 69 | Ford Cosworth FVA 1.6 L4 | F | (United Kingdom) Johnny Blades | 8 |
| (United Kingdom) John Wingfield | Brabham-Ford | BT30 | Ford Cosworth FVA 1.6 L4 | F | (United Kingdom) John Wingfield | 8 |

== Calendar ==
| Round | Race | Circuit | Date | Laps | Distance | Time | Speed | Pole position | Fastest lap | Winner |
|---|---|---|---|---|---|---|---|---|---|---|
| 1 | Wills Trophy | (United Kingdom) Thruxton | 30 March | 46 | 3.791=174.386 km | 0'57:41.0; 1 lap down | 181.390 km/h - | (United Kingdom) Jackie Stewart | (Austria) Jochen Rindt | (Austria) Jochen Rindt (United Kingdom) Derek Bell |
| 2 | Jim Clark-Rennen/Deutschland Trophäe | (West Germany) Hockenheim | 14 April | 20+20 | 6.769=270.76 km | 1'22:01.3 | 198.065 km/h | (Austria) Jochen Rindt | (Austria) Dieter Quester | (Switzerland) Clay Regazzoni |
| 3 | Gran Premio de Barcelona | (Spain) Barcelona | 26 April | 45 | 3.79=170.55 km | 1'08:07.6 | 150.205 km/h | (United Kingdom) Derek Bell | (United Kingdom) Derek Bell | (United Kingdom) Derek Bell |
| 4 | Grand Prix de Rouen-Les-Essarts | (France) Rouen | 31 May | 25 | 6.541=163.525 km | 0'51:24.0; 0'51:24.4 | 190.885 km/h 190.860 km/h | (Sweden) Ronnie Peterson | (Australia) Tim Schenken | (Switzerland) Jo Siffert (Switzerland) Clay Regazzoni |
| 5 | Gran Premio del Mediterraneo | (Italy) Pergusa-Enna | 23 August | 31+31 | 4.845=300.39 km | 1'28:03.5 | 204.676 km/h | (Belgium) Jacky Ickx | (Switzerland) Clay Regazzoni | (Switzerland) Clay Regazzoni |
| 6 | Flugplatzrennen Tulln-Langenlebarn | (Austria) Tulln-Langenlebarn | 13 September | 35+35 | 2.7=189.0 km | 1'13:45.82; 1'14:17.33 | 153.734 km/h 152.647 km/h | (Switzerland) Clay Regazzoni | (France) François Cevert | (Belgium) Jacky Ickx (France) François Cevert |
| 7 | Gran Premio Città di Imola | (Italy) Imola | 27 September | 28+28 | 5.018=281.008 km | 1'30:50.4 | 185.606 km/h | (Switzerland) Clay Regazzoni | (Belgium) Jacky Ickx | (Switzerland) Clay Regazzoni |
| 8 | Preis von Hessen und Württemberg | (West Germany) Hockenheim | 10 October | 35 | 6.789=237.615 km | 1'16:34.4 | 186.186 km/h | (Sweden) Ronnie Peterson | (Austria) Dieter Quester | (Austria) Dieter Quester |

Note:

- Races 2, 5, 6 and 7 were held in two heats, with results shown in aggregate.
- Races 1 and 4 were held with two semi-final heats and the final run, with time only shown for the final.
- Races 1, 4 and 6 were won by a graded driver, all graded drivers are shown in italics.

== Final point standings ==
=== Drivers ===
For every race, points were awarded: 9 points to the winner, 6 for runner-up, 4 for third place, 3 for fourth place, 2 for fifth place and 1 for sixth place. No additional points were awarded. The best 6 results counted. One driver had a point deduction, which is given in parentheses.

| Place | Name | Team | Chassis | Engine | THR (United Kingdom) | HOC (West Germany) | MNT (Spain) | ROU (France) | EMM (Italy) | TUL (Austria) | IMO (Italy) | HOC (West Germany) | Points |
|---|---|---|---|---|---|---|---|---|---|---|---|---|---|
| 1 | (Switzerland) Clay Regazzoni | Tecno Racing | Tecno | Ford | 2 | 9 | - | 9 | 9 | - | 9 | 6 | 44 |
| 2 | (United Kingdom) Derek Bell | Wheatcroft Racing | Brabham | Ford | 9 | 4 | 9 | (2) | 3 | 6 | 4 | | 35 |
| 2 | (United Kingdom) Derek Bell | BMW | BMW | BMW | | | | | | | | (1) | 35 |
| 3 | (Brazil) Emerson Fittipaldi | Team Bardahl | Lotus | Ford | - | 2 | 4 | 6 | 4 | - | 6 | 3 | 25 |
| 4 | (Austria) Dieter Quester | BMW | BMW | BMW | 3 | - | 2 | - | - | - | - | 9 | 14 |
| | (Sweden) Ronnie Peterson | Guthrie Racing | March | Ford | - | - | - | 3 | - | 4 | 3 | 4 | 14 |
| 6 | (United Kingdom) Robin Widdows | Walker Racing | Brabham | Ford | 6 | - | 3 | - | - | - | - | - | 9 |
| | (France) François Cevert | Tecno Racing | Tecno | Ford | - | - | - | - | - | 9 | - | - | 9 |
| | (Japan) Tetsu Ikuzawa | Ikuzawa Racing | Lotus | Ford | - | 6 | - | - | - | 2 | 1 | - | 9 |
| 9 | (United Kingdom) Peter Westbury | FIRST | Brabham | Ford | - | - | - | 1 | 6 | - | - | - | 7 |
| 10 | (France) Henri Pescarolo | Gerard Racing | Brabham | Ford | - | - | 6 | - | - | - | - | - | 6 |
| 11 | (United Kingdom) Alistair Walker | Walker Racing | Brabham | Ford | 4 | - | - | - | - | 1 | - | - | 5 |
| 12 | (Australia) Tim Schenken | Sports Motor International | Brabham | Ford | - | - | - | 4 | - | - | - | - | 4 |
| 13 | (West Germany) Hubert Hahne | BMW | BMW | BMW | - | 3 | - | - | - | - | - | - | 3 |
| | (Italy) Vittorio Brambilla | North Italian Racing | Brabham | Ford | - | - | - | - | - | 3 | - | - | 3 |
| | (Argentina) Carlos Reutemann | Automovil Club Argentino | Brabham | Ford | - | - | 1 | - | - | - | - | 2 | 3 |
| 16 | (France) Jean-Pierre Jabouille | Pygmée | Pygmée | Ford | - | - | - | - | 2 | - | - | - | 2 |
| | (United States) Mike Goth | private entry | Brabham | Ford | - | - | - | - | - | - | 2 | - | 2 |
| 18 | (United Kingdom) Tommy Reid | Irish Racing | Brabham | Ford | 1 | - | - | - | - | - | - | - | 1 |
| | (United Kingdom) Peter Gaydon | Gerard Racing | Brabham | Ford | - | 1 | - | - | - | - | - | - | 1 |

Note:

- Only drivers which were not graded were able to score points.
- In race 5 not all points were awarded (not enough finishers).

== Non-championship race results ==
Other Formula Two races, which did not count towards the European Championship, also held in 1970.

| Race name | Circuit | Date | Winning driver | Constructor |
|---|---|---|---|---|
| (France) XXX Grand Prix Automobile de Pau | Pau | 5 April | (Austria) Jochen Rindt | (United Kingdom) Lotus-Ford |
| (West Germany) XXXIII Internationales ADAC-Eifelrennen | Nürburgring | 3 May | (Austria) Jochen Rindt | (United Kingdom) Lotus-Ford |
| (Belgium) VII Grote Prijs van Limborg | Zolder | 24 May | (Austria) Jochen Rindt | (United Kingdom) Lotus-Ford |
| (United Kingdom) XVIII London Trophy | Crystal Palace | 25 May | (United Kingdom) Jackie Stewart | (United Kingdom) Brabham-Ford |
| (West Germany) V Rhein-Pokalrennen | Hockenheimring | 14 June | (West Germany) Hubert Hahne | (West Germany) BMW |
| (Italy) XII Gran Premio della Lotteria di Monza | Monza | 21 June | (Italy) Giovanni Salvati | (Italy) Tecno-Ford |
| I Trophée de France Formule 2 | Paul Ricard | 26 July | (Switzerland) Clay Regazzoni | (Italy) Tecno-Ford |
| (West Germany) I Preis von Deutschland | Nürburgring | 2 August | (Switzerland) Xavier Perrot | (United Kingdom) March-Ford |
| (Austria) I Festspielpreis der Stadt Salzburg | Salzburgring | 30 August | (Belgium) Jacky Ickx | (West Germany) BMW |
| (Sweden) I Mantorp Park Formula 2 Trophy | Mantorp Park | 30 August | (France) François Cevert | (Italy) Tecno-Ford |
| (Republic of Ireland) I Player's No. 6 Trophy | Phoenix Park | 13 September | (United Kingdom) Alan Rollinson | (United Kingdom) Brabham-Ford |
| (West Germany) V Flughafenrennen München-Neubiberg | Neubiberg | 25 October | (Austria) Dieter Quester | (West Germany) BMW |
| I Grand Prix of Israel | Ashkelon | 22 November | Cancelled after practice | |
