= 1969 European Formula Two Championship =

1969 European Formula Two season

Seasons
- ← 1968 1970 →

The 1969 European Formula Two season was contested over 7 rounds. Matra International driver Johnny Servoz-Gavin clinched the championship title.

== Teams and drivers ==
Entrant	Constructor	Chassis	Engine	Driver	Rounds
(United Kingdom) Roy Winkelmann Racing	Lotus-Ford	59B; 59	Ford Cosworth FVA 1.6 L4	(United Kingdom) Graham Hill	1, 3, 5-6
(United Kingdom) Roy Winkelmann Racing	Lotus-Ford	59B; 59	Ford Cosworth FVA 1.6 L4	(Austria) Jochen Rindt	1, 3, 5, 7
(United Kingdom) Roy Winkelmann Racing	Lotus-Ford	59B; 59	Ford Cosworth FVA 1.6 L4	(United States) Roy Pike	2
(United Kingdom) Roy Winkelmann Racing	Lotus-Ford	59B; 59	Ford Cosworth FVA 1.6 L4	(United Kingdom) Alan Rollinson	2, 4
(United Kingdom) Roy Winkelmann Racing	Lotus-Ford	59B; 59	Ford Cosworth FVA 1.6 L4	(United Kingdom) John Miles	4, 6-7
(United Kingdom) Roy Winkelmann Racing	Lotus-Ford	59B; 59	Ford Cosworth FVA 1.6 L4	(Italy) Andrea de Adamich	7
(Republic of Ireland) Team Ireland	Lotus-Ford	48	Ford Cosworth FVA 1.6 L4	(United Kingdom) John Pollock	1, 7
(Republic of Ireland) Team Ireland	Lotus-Ford	48	Ford Cosworth FVA 1.6 L4	(United Kingdom) John Watson	1
(Republic of Ireland) Team Ireland	Lotus-Ford	48	Ford Cosworth FVA 1.6 L4	(United Kingdom) John L'Amie	7
(United Kingdom) Matra International	Matra-Ford	MS7	Ford Cosworth FVA 1.6 L4	(United Kingdom) Jackie Stewart	1, 3-5
(United Kingdom) Matra International	Matra-Ford	MS7	Ford Cosworth FVA 1.6 L4	(France) Johnny Servoz-Gavin	1-4, 6-7
(United Kingdom) Matra International	Matra-Ford	MS7	Ford Cosworth FVA 1.6 L4	(France) Jean-Pierre Beltoise	3
(United Kingdom) Matra International	Matra-Ford	MS7	Ford Cosworth FVA 1.6 L4	(Italy) Claudio Francisci	7
(France) Matra Sports	Matra-Ford	MS7	Ford Cosworth FVA 1.6 L4	(France) Jean-Pierre Beltoise	1-2, 4-6
(France) Matra Sports	Matra-Ford	MS7	Ford Cosworth FVA 1.6 L4	(France) Henri Pescarolo	1-2, 5-6
(Italy) SpA Ferrari SEFAC	Ferrari	Dino 166 F2	Ferrari Dino 166 1.6 V6	(United Kingdom) Derek Bell	1, 3-4
(Italy) SpA Ferrari SEFAC	Ferrari	Dino 166 F2	Ferrari Dino 166 1.6 V6	(Italy) Ernesto Brambilla	1-4
(Italy) SpA Ferrari SEFAC	Ferrari	Dino 166 F2	Ferrari Dino 166 1.6 V6	(Switzerland) Clay Regazzoni	1-4
(Italy) Tecno Racing Team	Tecno-Ford	68; 69	Ford Cosworth FVA 1.6 L4	(France) François Cevert	1-6
(Italy) Tecno Racing Team	Tecno-Ford	68; 69	Ford Cosworth FVA 1.6 L4	(Italy) Nanni Galli	1-6
(Italy) Tecno Racing Team	Tecno-Ford	68; 69	Ford Cosworth FVA 1.6 L4	(Switzerland) Clay Regazzoni	6
(West Germany) BB Racing Team	Tecno-Ford	69	Ford Cosworth FVA 1.6 L4	(Switzerland) Max Büsch	1
(West Germany) BB Racing Team	Tecno-Ford	69	Ford Cosworth FVA 1.6 L4	(Austria) Günther Huber	5
(United Kingdom) Frank Williams Racing Cars	Tecno-Ford	69	Ford Cosworth FVA 1.6 L4	(United Kingdom) Alistair Walker	1-4
(United Kingdom) Frank Williams Racing Cars	Brabham-Ford	BT23C; BT30	Ford Cosworth FVA 1.6 L4	(United Kingdom) Piers Courage	1-2, 4, 6
(United Kingdom) Frank Williams Racing Cars	Brabham-Ford	BT23C; BT30	Ford Cosworth FVA 1.6 L4	(New Zealand) Graham McRae	1, 4
(United Kingdom) Frank Williams Racing Cars	Brabham-Ford	BT23C; BT30	Ford Cosworth FVA 1.6 L4	(United Kingdom) Malcolm Guthrie	1-4
(United Kingdom) Frank Williams Racing Cars	Brabham-Ford	BT23C; BT30	Ford Cosworth FVA 1.6 L4	(United Kingdom) Derek Bell	7
(United Kingdom) Frank Williams Racing Cars	Brabham-Ford	BT23C; BT30	Ford Cosworth FVA 1.6 L4	(Italy) Franco Barnabei	7
(United Kingdom) The Paul Watson Racing Organisation	Brabham-Ford	BT23C	Ford Cosworth FVA 1.6 L4	(United Kingdom) Bill Ivy	1, 3
(United Kingdom) FIRST	Brabham-Ford	BT30	Ford Cosworth FVA 1.6 L4	(United Kingdom) Peter Westbury	All
(West Germany) Montan Racing Team	Brabham-Ford	BT23; BT23C	Ford Cosworth FVA 1.6 L4	(West Germany) Werner Lindermann	1-3, 5, 7
(West Germany) Montan Racing Team	Brabham-Ford	BT23; BT23C	Ford Cosworth FVA 1.6 L4	(West Germany) Bernd Terbeck	2-4, 6
(Switzerland) Squadra Tartaruga	Brabham-Ford	BT23; BT23C	Ford Cosworth FVA 1.6 L4	(Switzerland) Xavier Perrot	1, 3, 5, 7
(Republic of Ireland) Irish Racing Cars	Brabham-Ford	BT23; BT30	Ford Cosworth FVA 1.6 L4	(United Kingdom) Tommy Reid	1, 7
(Republic of Ireland) Irish Racing Cars	Brabham-Ford	BT23; BT30	Ford Cosworth FVA 1.6 L4	(United Kingdom) Alan Rollinson	6-7
(Italy) Scuderia Picchio Rosso	Brabham-Ford	BT23	Ford Cosworth FVA 1.6 L4	(Italy) Enzo Corti	All
(Italy) Scuderia Picchio Rosso	Tecno-Ford	68	Ford Cosworth FVA 1.6 L4	(Italy) Carlo Facetti	6
(West Germany) Ahrens Racing Team	Brabham-Ford	BT30	Ford Cosworth FVA 1.6 L4	(West Germany) Kurt Ahrens Jr.	1-3, 5
(United Kingdom) Ecurie Ecosse	Brabham-Ford	BT23C	Ford Cosworth FVA 1.6 L4	(United Kingdom) Graham Birrell	1, 4, 6
(West Germany) Bayerische Motoren Werke	Lola-BMW	T102	BMW M11 1.6 L4	(Switzerland) Jo Siffert	1, 3
(West Germany) Bayerische Motoren Werke	Lola-BMW	T102	BMW M11 1.6 L4	(West Germany) Hubert Hahne	1-4
(West Germany) Bayerische Motoren Werke	BMW	269	BMW M11 1.6 L4	(West Germany) Hubert Hahne	5-7
(West Germany) Bayerische Motoren Werke	BMW	269	BMW M11 1.6 L4	(West Germany) Gerhard Mitter	3
(West Germany) Bayerische Motoren Werke	BMW	269	BMW M11 1.6 L4	(Austria) Dieter Quester	5, 7
(West Germany) Bayerische Motoren Werke	BMW	269	BMW M11 1.6 L4	(Switzerland) Jo Siffert	6
(France) Constructions Mechaniques Pygmée	Pygmée-Ford	MDB12	Ford Cosworth FVA 1.6 L4	(France) Patrick Dal Bo	1, 3-4, 6-7
(France) Constructions Mechaniques Pygmée	Pygmée-Ford	MDB12	Ford Cosworth FVA 1.6 L4	(France) Éric Offenstadt	1, 3-5
(United Kingdom) Merlyn Racing (United Kingdom) Bob Gerard Racing	Merlyn-Ford	Mk 12	Ford Cosworth FVA 1.6 L4	(United Kingdom) Brian Hart	2, 6-7
(United Kingdom) Merlyn Racing (United Kingdom) Bob Gerard Racing	Merlyn-Ford	Mk 12	Ford Cosworth FVA 1.6 L4	(United Kingdom) Robin Widdows	3-4
(United Kingdom) Merlyn Racing (United Kingdom) Bob Gerard Racing	Brabham-Ford	BT23C	Ford Cosworth FVA 1.6 L4	(United Kingdom) Robin Widdows	6-7
(United Kingdom) Merlyn Racing (United Kingdom) Bob Gerard Racing	Brabham-Ford	BT23C	Ford Cosworth FVA 1.6 L4	(United Kingdom) Brian Hart	5
(Switzerland) Midland Racing Team	Tecno-Ford	69	Ford Cosworth FVA 1.6 L4	(Switzerland) Bruno Frey	2, 7
(United Kingdom) Len Street Engineering	Lotus-Ford	59B	Ford Cosworth FVA 1.6 L4	(United Kingdom) Max Mosley	3
(Italy) Alessandro de Tomaso	De Tomaso-Ford	103	Ford Cosworth FVA 1.6 L4	(United Kingdom) Jonathan Williams	5
(Italy) Alessandro de Tomaso	De Tomaso-Ford	103	Ford Cosworth FVA 1.6 L4	(Belgium) Jacky Ickx	6
(Italy) Alessandro de Tomaso	De Tomaso-Ford	103	Ford Cosworth FVA 1.6 L4	(United Kingdom) Piers Courage	7

- Pink background denotes graded drivers ineligible for points.

== Calendar ==
Race	Circuit Race	Date	Laps	Distance	Time	Speed	Pole position	Fastest lap	Winner
1	(United Kingdom) Thruxton; Wills Trophy	7 April	50	3.862=193.10 km	1'02:44.6; 1 lap down	184.657 km/h -	(Austria) Jochen Rindt	(Austria) Jochen Rindt	(Austria) Jochen Rindt (France) Henri Pescarolo
2	(West Germany) Hockenheim; Jim Clark-Rennen/Deutschland Trophäe	13 April	20+20	6.769=270.76 km	1'21:39.6; 1'21:40.2	198.942 km/h 198.918 km/h	(France) Henri Pescarolo	(France) Jean-Pierre Beltoise	(France) Jean-Pierre Beltoise (West Germany) Hubert Hahne
3	(West Germany) Nürburgring; Eifelrennen	27 April	10	22.835=228.35 km	1'21:40.4; 1'23:52.4	167.754 km/h 163.353 km/h	(Switzerland) Jo Siffert	(United Kingdom) Jackie Stewart	(United Kingdom) Jackie Stewart (West Germany) Hubert Hahne
4	(Spain) Jarama; Gran Premio de Madrid	11 May	60	3.404=204.24 km	1'29:36.7; 1 lap down	136.750 km/h -	(France) Jean-Pierre Beltoise	(United Kingdom) Jackie Stewart (France) Jean-Pierre Beltoise	(United Kingdom) Jackie Stewart (France) Johnny Servoz-Gavin
5	(Austria) Tulln-Langenlebarn; Flugplatzrennen Tulln-Langenlebarn	12–13 July	35+35	2.7=189.0 km	1'13:22.02; 1'14:33.40	154.565 km/h 152.099 km/h	(Austria) Jochen Rindt	(Austria) Jochen Rindt	(Austria) Jochen Rindt (France) François Cevert
6	(Italy) Pergusa-Enna; Gran Premio del Mediterraneo	24 August	31+31	4.7=296.98 km	1'17:58.0; 1'17:58.7	228.544 km/h 228.510 km/h	(Switzerland) Clay Regazzoni	(United Kingdom) Graham Hill	(United Kingdom) Piers Courage (France) Johnny Servoz-Gavin
7	(Italy) Vallelunga; Gran Premio di Roma	12 October	40+40	3.2=224.0 km	1'25:57.2	149.525 km/h	(France) Johnny Servoz-Gavin	(France) Johnny Servoz-Gavin	(France) Johnny Servoz-Gavin

Note:

Race 2, 5, 6 and 7 were held in two heats, with results shown in aggregate.

Race 1 was held with two semi-final heats and the final run, with time only shown for the final.

Race 1, 2, 3, 4, 5 and 6 was won by a graded driver, all graded drivers are shown in Italics.

== Final point standings ==
=== Driver ===
For every race points were awarded: 9 points to the winner, 6 for runner-up, 4 for third place, 3 for fourth place, 2 for fifth place and 1 for sixth place. No additional points were awarded. The best 5 results count. One driver had a point deduction, which is given in ().

Place	Name	Team	Chassis	Engine	THR (United Kingdom)	HOC (West Germany)	NÜR (West Germany)	JAR (Spain)	TUL (Austria)	EMM (Italy)	VLL (Italy)	Points
1	(France) Johnny Servoz-Gavin	Matra International	Matra	Ford	6	(3)	4	9	-	9	9	37
2	(West Germany) Hubert Hahne	BMW	Lola	BMW	-	9	9	6				28
2	(West Germany) Hubert Hahne	BMW	BMW	BMW					4	-	-	28
3	(France) François Cevert	Tecno Racing	Tecno	Ford	3	-	3	-	9	6	-	21
4	(France) Henri Pescarolo	Matra Sports	Matra	Ford	9	4	-	-	-	-	-	13
5	(United Kingdom) Peter Westbury	FIRST	Brabham	Ford	-	-	-	3	2	-	6	11
	(United Kingdom) Derek Bell	Ferrari	Ferrari	Ferrari Dino	-	-	6	2	-	-		11
	(United Kingdom) Derek Bell	Williams Racing	Brabham	Ford							3	11
7	(Italy) Tino Brambilla	Ferrari	Ferrari	Ferrari Dino	4	-	-	4	-	-	-	8
	(Italy) Nanni Galli	Tecno Racing	Tecno	Ford	-	1	-	1	6	-	-	8
9	(West Germany) Kurt Ahrens Jr.	Ahrens Racing	Brabham	Ford	-	6	-	-	-	-	-	6
10	(Switzerland) Clay Regazzoni	Ferrari	Ferrari	Ferrari Dino	1	-	-	-	-			5
10	(Switzerland) Clay Regazzoni	Tecno Racing	Tecno	Ford						4	-	5
11	(United Kingdom) Alan Rollinson	Winkelmann Racing	Lotus	Ford	-	2	-	-	-			4
11	(United Kingdom) Alan Rollinson	Irish Racing	Brabham	Ford						2	-	4
	(United Kingdom) John Miles	Winkelmann Racing	Lotus	Ford	-	-	-	-	-	-	4	4
13	(Switzerland) Xavier Perrot	Squadra Tartaruga	Brabham	Ford	-	-	-	-	3	-	-	3
	(United Kingdom) Robin Widdows	Gerard Racing	Brabham	Ford	-	-	-	-	-	3	-	3
15	(Italy) Enzo Corti	Scuderia Picchio Rossa	Brabham	Ford	2	-	-	-	-	-	-	2
	(United Kingdom) Malcolm Guthrie	Williams Racing	Brabham	Ford	-	-	2	-	-	-	-	2
	(West Germany) Werner Lindermann	Montan Racing	Brabham	Ford	-	-	1	-	1	-	-	2
	(Italy) Franco Bernabei	Williams Racing	Brabham	Ford	-	-	-	-	-	-	2	2
19	(France) Patrick Dal Bo	Pygmée	Pygmée	Ford	-	-	-	-	-	1	-	1
	(United Kingdom) John Pollock	Team Ireland	Lotus	Ford	-	-	-	-	-	-	1	1

Note:

Only drivers which were not graded were able to score points.

== Non-championship race results ==
Other Formula Two races, which did not count towards the European Championship, also held in 1969.

Race name	Circuit	Date	Winning driver	Constructor
(Spain) III Gran Premio de Madrid †	Jarama	13 April	(New Zealand) Bill Stone	(United Kingdom) Brabham-Lotus
(France) XXIX Grand Prix Automobile de Pau	Pau	20 April	(Austria) Jochen Rindt	(United Kingdom) Lotus-Ford
(Belgium) VI Grote Prijs van Limborg	Zolder	8 June	(Austria) Jochen Rindt	(United Kingdom) Lotus-Ford
(West Germany) IV Rhein-Pokalrennen	Hockenheimring	15 June	(United Kingdom) Brian Hart	(United Kingdom) Brabham-Ford
(Italy) XI Gran Premio della Lotteria di Monza	Monza	22 June	(United Kingdom) Robin Widdows	(United Kingdom) Brabham-Ford
(France) XXXV Grand Prix de Reims	Reims-Gueux	29 June	(France) François Cevert	(Italy) Tecno-Ford
(West Germany) XXXI Großer Preis von Deutschland ‡	Nürburgring	3 August	(France) Henri Pescarolo	(France) Matra-Ford
(France) XXVIII Grand Prix d'Albi	Albi	14 September	(United Kingdom) Graham Hill	(United Kingdom) Lotus-Ford
(West Germany) IV Flughafenrennen München-Neubiberg	Neubiberg	26 October	(United Kingdom) Peter Westbury	(United Kingdom) Brabham-Ford

† - Joint F1/F2/F5000 race. F2 winner shown.

‡ – Joint F1/F2 race. F2 winner shown.
