= 1968 European Formula Two Championship =

1968 European Formula Two season

Seasons
- ← 1967 1969 →

The 1968 European Formula Two Championship was contested over nine rounds. Jean Pierre Beltoise won the championship in Pergusa-Enna. Although Jochen Rindt won 5 races, he was a graded driver and was therefore not allowed to score championship points.

In this season, Jim Clark died at Hockenheimring, first race of the year.

== Teams and drivers ==
Entrant	Constructor	Chassis	Engine	Driver	Rounds
(United Kingdom) Gold Leaf Team Lotus	Lotus-Ford	48	Ford Cosworth FVA 1.6 L4	(United Kingdom) Jim Clark	1
(United Kingdom) Gold Leaf Team Lotus	Lotus-Ford	48	Ford Cosworth FVA 1.6 L4	(United Kingdom) Graham Hill	1, 3, 4-5, 9
(United Kingdom) Gold Leaf Team Lotus	Lotus-Ford	48	Ford Cosworth FVA 1.6 L4	(United Kingdom) Jackie Oliver	2-6, 8
(Italy) Ferrari Automobili (Italy) SpA Ferrari SEFAC	Ferrari	Dino 166 F2	Ferrari Dino 166 1.6 V6	(New Zealand) Chris Amon	1, 5
(Italy) Ferrari Automobili (Italy) SpA Ferrari SEFAC	Ferrari	Dino 166 F2	Ferrari Dino 166 1.6 V6	(Belgium) Jacky Ickx	4, 7
(Italy) Ferrari Automobili (Italy) SpA Ferrari SEFAC	Ferrari	Dino 166 F2	Ferrari Dino 166 1.6 V6	(United Kingdom) Derek Bell	5-9
(Italy) Ferrari Automobili (Italy) SpA Ferrari SEFAC	Ferrari	Dino 166 F2	Ferrari Dino 166 1.6 V6	(Italy) Ernesto Brambilla	6-9
(Italy) Ferrari Automobili (Italy) SpA Ferrari SEFAC	Ferrari	Dino 166 F2	Ferrari Dino 166 1.6 V6	(Italy) Mario Casoni	7
(Italy) Ferrari Automobili (Italy) SpA Ferrari SEFAC	Ferrari	Dino 166 F2	Ferrari Dino 166 1.6 V6	(Italy) Andrea de Adamich	9
(West Germany) Kurt Ahrens Jr. (West Germany) Caltex Racing Team	Brabham-Ford	BT23C	Ford Cosworth FVA 1.6 L4	(West Germany) Kurt Ahrens Jr.	1-6, 8-9
(United Kingdom) Lola Racing Ltd (United Kingdom) Alistair Walker Racing	Lola-Ford	T100	Ford Cosworth FVA 1.6 L4	(United Kingdom) Chris Irwin	1-3
(United Kingdom) Lola Racing Ltd (United Kingdom) Alistair Walker Racing	Lola-Ford	T100	Ford Cosworth FVA 1.6 L4	(United Kingdom) Alistair Walker	2-4, 6, 9
(United Kingdom) Frank Williams Racing Cars	Brabham-Ford	BT23C	Ford Cosworth FVA 1.6 L4	(United Kingdom) Piers Courage	1-7
(United Kingdom) Frank Williams Racing Cars	Brabham-Ford	BT23C	Ford Cosworth FVA 1.6 L4	(Sweden) Picko Troberg	1
(United Kingdom) Frank Williams Racing Cars	Brabham-Ford	BT23C	Ford Cosworth FVA 1.6 L4	(United Kingdom) Derek Bell	1
(United Kingdom) Frank Williams Racing Cars	Brabham-Ford	BT23C	Ford Cosworth FVA 1.6 L4	(United Kingdom) Max Mosley	6, 9
(United Kingdom) Frank Williams Racing Cars	Chevron-Ford	B10	Ford Cosworth FVA 1.6 L4	(United Kingdom) Samuel Brown	7
(France) Matra Sports	Matra-Ford	MS7	Ford Cosworth FVA 1.6 L4	(France) Jean-Pierre Beltoise	1-3, 5-7, 9
(France) Matra Sports	Matra-Ford	MS7	Ford Cosworth FVA 1.6 L4	(France) Henri Pescarolo	All
(France) Matra Sports	Matra-Ford	MS7	Ford Cosworth FVA 1.6 L4	(France) Johnny Servoz-Gavin	4
(France) Matra Sports	Matra-Ford	MS7	Ford Cosworth FVA 1.6 L4	(France) Jean-Pierre Jabouille	8
(United Kingdom) McLaren Racing Team (United Kingdom) The Chequered Flag Racing	McLaren-Ford	M4A	Ford Cosworth FVA 1.6 L4	(New Zealand) Graeme Lawrence	1-3
(United Kingdom) McLaren Racing Team (United Kingdom) The Chequered Flag Racing	McLaren-Ford	M4A	Ford Cosworth FVA 1.6 L4	(United Kingdom) Robin Widdows	1-7
(United Kingdom) McLaren Racing Team (United Kingdom) The Chequered Flag Racing	McLaren-Ford	M4A	Ford Cosworth FVA 1.6 L4	(Australia) Frank Gardner	4-5
(United Kingdom) McLaren Racing Team (United Kingdom) The Chequered Flag Racing	McLaren-Ford	M4A	Ford Cosworth FVA 1.6 L4	(United Kingdom) Mike Walker	6-7
(France) Ecurie Intersport SA	McLaren-Ford	M4A	Ford Cosworth FVA 1.6 L4	(France) Guy Ligier	1-3
(France) Ecurie Intersport SA	McLaren-Ford	M4A	Ford Cosworth FVA 1.6 L4	(France) Jo Schlesser	1-4
(Switzerland) Squadra Tartaruga	Brabham-Ford	BT23	Ford Cosworth FVA 1.6 L4	(Switzerland) Xavier Perrot	1-2, 4, 6, 8
(Switzerland) Squadra Tartaruga	Brabham-Ford	BT23	Ford Cosworth FVA 1.6 L4	(Austria) Günther Huber	5
(United Kingdom) London Racing Team	Brabham-Ford	BT23C	Ford Cosworth FVA 1.6 L4	(United Kingdom) Chris Lambert	1-6
(United Kingdom) London Racing Team	Brabham-Ford	BT23C	Ford Cosworth FVA 1.6 L4	(United Kingdom) Max Mosley	1-4
(United Kingdom) Frank Lythgoe Racing	Chevron-Ford	B10	Ford Cosworth FVA 1.6 L4	(United Kingdom) Peter Gethin	1-2, 4
(United Kingdom) Frank Lythgoe Racing	Brabham-Ford	BT23C	Ford Cosworth FVA 1.6 L4	(United Kingdom) Peter Gethin	6-9
(Switzerland) Walter Habegger (Switzerland) Valvoline Racing Team	Lotus-Ford	41C	Ford Cosworth FVA 1.6 L4	(Switzerland) Walter Habegger	1
(Switzerland) Walter Habegger (Switzerland) Valvoline Racing Team	Brabham-Ford	BT23	Ford Cosworth FVA 1.6 L4	(Switzerland) Walter Habegger	2-3, 4, 6, 8
(Switzerland) Walter Habegger (Switzerland) Valvoline Racing Team	Brabham-Alfa Romeo	BT18	Alfa Romeo GTA 1.6 L4	(Austria) Gerhard Krammer	5
(Italy) Tecno Racing Team	Tecno-Ford	PA68	Ford Cosworth FVA 1.6 L4	(Italy) Carlo Facetti	1
(Italy) Tecno Racing Team	Tecno-Ford	PA68	Ford Cosworth FVA 1.6 L4	(Switzerland) Clay Regazzoni	2, 4, 6-9
(Italy) Tecno Racing Team	Tecno-Ford	PA68	Ford Cosworth FVA 1.6 L4	(France) Jean-Pierre Jaussaud	4
(Switzerland) Midland Racing Team	Lotus-Ford	41C	Ford Cosworth FVA 1.6 L4	(Switzerland) Bruno Frey	1-2, 8
(Switzerland) Midland Racing Team	Brabham-Lotus	BT16/18	Lotus LF 1.6 L4	(Switzerland) Paul Blum	8
(United Kingdom) Robert Lamplough	McLaren-Ford	M4A	Ford Cosworth FVA 1.6 L4	(United Kingdom) Robert Lamplough	1-2
(United Kingdom) Roy Winkelmann Racing	Brabham-Ford	BT23C	Ford Cosworth FVA 1.6 L4	(Austria) Jochen Rindt	2-6, 8-9
(United Kingdom) Roy Winkelmann Racing	Brabham-Ford	BT23C	Ford Cosworth FVA 1.6 L4	(United Kingdom) Alan Rees	2, 4-5, 7
(United Kingdom) Roy Winkelmann Racing	Brabham-Ford	BT23C	Ford Cosworth FVA 1.6 L4	(West Germany) Gerhard Mitter	8
(United Kingdom) Church Farm Racing Team	Brabham-Ford	BT23C	Ford Cosworth FVA 1.6 L4	(United Kingdom) Derek Bell	2-4
(United Kingdom) Church Farm Racing Team	Brabham-Ford	BT23C	Ford Cosworth FVA 1.6 L4	(United Kingdom) Brian Hart	5-9
(United Kingdom) Bill Jones Racing	Brabham-Ford	BT10	Ford Cosworth FVA 1.6 L4	(United Kingdom) Chris Meek	2, 6, 8-9
(United Kingdom) Allan Deacon	Brabham-Lotus	BT21	Lotus LF 1.6 L4	(United Kingdom) Allan Deacon	2
(United Kingdom) David Bridges Racing	Lola-Ford	T100	Ford Cosworth FVA 1.6 L4	(United Kingdom) Chris Williams	2
(United Kingdom) David Bridges Racing	Lola-Ford	T100	Ford Cosworth FVA 1.6 L4	(United Kingdom) Brian Redman	4
(United Kingdom) David Bridges Racing	Lola-Ford	T100	Ford Cosworth FVA 1.6 L4	(United Kingdom) Mike Beckwith	5-6
(United Kingdom) David Bridges Racing	Lola-Ford	T100	Ford Cosworth FVA 1.6 L4	(United Kingdom) David Hobbs	8-9
(United Kingdom) Bob Gerard (United Kingdom) Merlyn Racing	Merlyn-Ford	Mk 12	Ford Cosworth FVA 1.6 L4	(United Kingdom) Harry Stiller	2
(United Kingdom) Bob Gerard (United Kingdom) Merlyn Racing	Merlyn-Ford	Mk 12	Ford Cosworth FVA 1.6 L4	(United Kingdom) John Cardwell	2-4
(United Kingdom) Bob Gerard (United Kingdom) Merlyn Racing	Merlyn-Ford	Mk 12	Ford Cosworth FVA 1.6 L4	(United Kingdom) Brian Hart	3-4
(United Kingdom) Bob Gerard (United Kingdom) Merlyn Racing	Merlyn-Ford	Mk 12	Ford Cosworth FVA 1.6 L4	(Netherlands) Toine Hezemans	6
(United Kingdom) Bob Gerard (United Kingdom) Merlyn Racing	Merlyn-Ford	Mk 12	Ford Cosworth FVA 1.6 L4	(United Kingdom) Jonathan Williams	6
(United Kingdom) Bob Gerard (United Kingdom) Merlyn Racing	Merlyn-Ford	Mk 12	Ford Cosworth FVA 1.6 L4	(United Kingdom) Mike Walker	8
(United Kingdom) Bob Gerard (United Kingdom) Merlyn Racing	Merlyn-Ford	Mk 12	Ford Cosworth FVA 1.6 L4	(United Kingdom) Peter Gaydon	8
(United Kingdom) Bob Gerard (United Kingdom) Merlyn Racing	Merlyn-Ford	Mk 12	Ford Cosworth FVA 1.6 L4	(United Kingdom) Alan Rollinson	9
(United Kingdom) Bob Gerard (United Kingdom) Merlyn Racing	Merlyn-Ford	Mk 12	Ford Cosworth FVA 1.6 L4	(United Kingdom) Chris Williams	9
(Spain) Escuderia Nacional CS	Lola-Ford	T100	Ford Cosworth FVA 1.6 L4	(Spain) Alex Soler-Roig	3-4, 6
(Spain) Escuderia Nacional CS	Lola-Ford	T100	Ford Cosworth FVA 1.6 L4	(Spain) Jorge de Bagration	3-4, 6
(United Kingdom) Matra International	Matra-Ford	MS7	Ford Cosworth FVA 1.6 L4	(United Kingdom) Jackie Stewart	3
(Italy) Scuderia Ala d'Oro	Brabham-Alfa Romeo	BT23	Alfa Romeo GTA 1.6 L4	(Italy) Nanni Galli	3
(Italy) Scuderia Picchio Rosso	Brabham-Ford	BT23C; BT23	Ford Cosworth FVA 1.6 L4	(Italy) Corrado Manfredini	4-9
(Italy) Scuderia Picchio Rosso	Brabham-Ford	BT23C; BT23	Ford Cosworth FVA 1.6 L4	(Italy) Ernesto Brambilla	5
(Italy) Scuderia Picchio Rosso	Brabham-Ford	BT23C; BT23	Ford Cosworth FVA 1.6 L4	(Italy) Enzo Corti	9
(Italy) Scuderia Picchio Rosso	Tecno-Ford	PA68	Ford Cosworth FVA 1.6 L4	(Italy) Carlo Facetti	9
(United Kingdom) Frank Manning Racing	McLaren-Ford	M4A	Ford Cosworth FVA 1.6 L4	(United Kingdom) Robert Lamplough	4, 6, 8-9
(United Kingdom) Ron Harris Racing Division	Tecno-Ford	PA68	Ford Cosworth FVA 1.6 L4	(Mexico) Pedro Rodríguez	4, 7
(United Kingdom) Ron Harris Racing Division	Tecno-Ford	PA68	Ford Cosworth FVA 1.6 L4	(United Kingdom) Richard Attwood	6
(United Kingdom) Ron Harris Racing Division	Tecno-Ford	PA68	Ford Cosworth FVA 1.6 L4	(France) Eric Offenstadt	6
(United Kingdom) Ron Harris Racing Division	Tecno-Ford	PA68	Ford Cosworth FVA 1.6 L4	(United Kingdom) Jonathan Williams	7
(Switzerland) Charles Vögele Racing Team	Tecno-Ford	PA68	Ford Cosworth FVA 1.6 L4	(Switzerland) Silvio Moser	5-7, 9
(West Germany) Mitter Tuning	Brabham-Ford	BT23	Ford Cosworth FVA 1.6 L4	(West Germany) Werner Lindermann	6, 8
(West Germany) Bayerische Motoren Werke	Lola-BMW	T102	BMW M11 1.6 L4	(Switzerland) Jo Siffert	8-9
(West Germany) Bayerische Motoren Werke	Lola-BMW	T102	BMW M11 1.6 L4	(West Germany) Hubert Hahne	8-9

- Pink background denotes graded drivers ineligible for points.

== Calendar ==
Race No	Circuit	Date	Laps	Distance	Time	Speed	Pole position	Fastest lap	Winner
1	(West Germany) Hockenheim	7 April	20+20	6.769=270.76 km	1'25:49.7	189.280 km/h	(France) Jean-Pierre Beltoise	(France) Henri Pescarolo	(France) Jean-Pierre Beltoise
2	(United Kingdom) Thruxton	15 April	54	3.862=208.548 km	1'09:45.6; 1'09:53.0	179.370 km/h 179.054 km/h	(Austria) Jochen Rindt	(Austria) Jochen Rindt	(Austria) Jochen Rindt (France) Jean-Pierre Beltoise
3	(Spain) Jarama	28 April	60	3.404=204.24 km	1'30:09.7	135.916 km/h	(France) Jean-Pierre Beltoise	(France) Jean-Pierre Beltoise	(France) Jean-Pierre Beltoise
4	(United Kingdom) Crystal Palace	3 June	90	2.237=201.330 km	1'20:06.8; 1'20:37.0	150.784 km/h 149.842 km/h	(United Kingdom) Brian Redman	(Austria) Jochen Rindt	(Austria) Jochen Rindt (United Kingdom) Brian Redman
5	(Austria) Tulln-Langenlebarn	14 July	35+35	2.86=200.2 km	1'15:24.63; 1'15:57.15	150.377 km/h 149.304 km/h	(Austria) Jochen Rindt	(Austria) Jochen Rindt	(Austria) Jochen Rindt (France) Jean-Pierre Beltoise
6	(Netherlands) Zandvoort	28 July	50	4.193=209.65 km	1'13:52.18	170.286 km/h	(United Kingdom) Derek Bell	(Italy) Tino Brambilla	(France) Jean-Pierre Beltoise
7	(Italy) Pergusa-Enna	25 August	50	4.798=239.90 km	1'02:40.6; 1'02:40.6	229.655 km/h 229.655 km/h	(France) Henri Pescarolo	(Austria) Jochen Rindt	(Austria) Jochen Rindt (United Kingdom) Piers Courage
8	(West Germany) Hockenheim	13 October	35	6.769=236.915 km	1'11:40.2	198.338 km/h	(Austria) Jochen Rindt	(Italy) Tino Brambilla	(Italy) Tino Brambilla
9	(Italy) Vallelunga	27 October	40+40	3.115=249.2 km	1'43:02.7	145.102 km/h	(Italy) Tino Brambilla	(Italy) Tino Brambilla	(Italy) Tino Brambilla

Note:

Race 1, 5 and 9 were held in two heats, with results shown in aggregate.

Race 2, 4 and 6 were held with two semi-final heats and the final run, with time only shown for the final.

Race 2, 4, 5 and 7 was won by a graded driver, all graded drivers are shown in Italics.

Race 1 (heat 1) Jim Clark was fatally injured.

== Final point standings ==
For every race points were awarded: 9 points to the winner, 6 for runner-up, 4 for third place, 3 for fourth place, 2 for fifth place and 1 for sixth place. No additional points were awarded. The best 7 results count (some sources count the best 6 results). No drivers scored in more than 7 races and just one scored in more than 6. If the best 6 scores are taken Henri Pescarolo would drop his 1 point score, dropping his total to 30.

Place	Name	Team	Chassis	Engine	HOC (West Germany)	THR (United Kingdom)	JAR (Spain)	CRY (United Kingdom)	TUL (Austria)	ZAN (Netherlands)	EMM (Italy)	HOC (West Germany)	VLL (Italy)	Points
1	(France) Jean-Pierre Beltoise	Matra Sports	Matra	Ford	9	9	9	-	9	9	-	-	3	48
2	(France) Henri Pescarolo	Matra Sports	Matra	Ford	6	-	4	-	6	6	1	6	2	31
3	(Italy) Tino Brambilla	Scuderia Picchio Rossa	Brabham	Ford	-	-	-	-	2	-				26
3	(Italy) Tino Brambilla	Ferrari	Ferrari	Ferrari Dino							6	9	9	26
4	(United Kingdom) Derek Bell	Church Farm Racing	Brabham	Ford	-	6	-	-						15
4	(United Kingdom) Derek Bell	Ferrari	Ferrari	Ferrari Dino					1	-	3	4	1	15
5	(United Kingdom) Jackie Oliver	Team Lotus	Lotus	Ford	-	4	-	4	3	-	-	3	-	14
6	(United Kingdom) Piers Courage	Williams Racing	Brabham	Ford	4	-	-	-	-	-	9	-	-	13
7	(West Germany) Kurt Ahrens Jr.	private entry	Brabham	Ford	-	3	6	-	4	-	-	-	-	13
	(Switzerland) Clay Regazzoni	Tecno Racing	Tecno	Ford	-	-	3	6	-	-	4	-	-	13
9	(United Kingdom) Brian Redman	Bridges Racing	Lola	Ford	-	-	-	9	-	-	-	-	-	9
10	(Italy) Andrea de Adamich	Ferrari	Ferrari	Ferrari Dino	-	-	-	-	-	-	-	-	6	6
11	(France) Jo Schlesser	Écurie International	McLaren	Ford	2	-	-	3	-	-	-	-	-	5
12	(United Kingdom) Peter Gethin	Lythgoe Racing	Chevron	Ford	-	-	-	-	-	-	-	-		4
12	(United Kingdom) Peter Gethin	Lythgoe Racing	Brabham	Ford									4	4
	(United Kingdom) Richard Attwood	Harris Racing	Tecno	Ford	-	-	-	-	-	4	-	-	-	4
14	(United Kingdom) Brian Hart	Merlyn Racing	Merlyn-Brabham	Ford	-	-	1	-	-	-				4
14	(United Kingdom) Brian Hart	Church Farm Racing	Brabham	Ford							2	1	-	4
15	(United Kingdom) Chris Lambert	London Racing	Brabham	Ford	3	-	-	-	-	-	-	-	-	3
	(Switzerland) Silvio Moser	Vögele Racing	Tecno	Ford	-	-	-	-	-	3	-	-	-	3
17	(United Kingdom) Robin Widdows	McLaren Racing	McLaren	Ford	1	-	-							2
17	(United Kingdom) Robin Widdows	Chequered Flag Racing	McLaren	Ford				-	-	1	-	-	-	2
	(United Kingdom) Chris Williams	Bridges Racing	Lola	Ford	-	2	-	-	-	-	-	-	-	2
	(Spain) Jorge de Bagration	Escuderia Nacional	Lola	Ford	-	-	2	-	-	-	-	-	-	2
	(France) Jean-Pierre Jaussaud	Tecno Racing	Tecno	Ford	-	-	-	2	-	-	-	-	-	2
	(France) Éric Offenstadt	Harris Racing	Tecno	Ford	-	-	-	-	-	2	-	-	-	2
	(United Kingdom) David Hobbs	Bridges Racing	Lola	Ford	-	-	-	-	-	-	-	2	-	2
23	(United Kingdom) Alan Rees	Winkelmann Racing	Brabham	Ford	-	1	-	-	-	-	-	-	-	1

Note:

Only drivers which were not graded were able to score points.

At Crystal Palace not all points were awarded as there were not enough finishers.

== Non-championship race results ==
Other Formula Two races, which did not count towards the European Championship, also held in 1968.

Race name	Circuit	Date	Winning driver	Constructor
(Spain) III Gran Premio de Barcelona	Montjuïc	31 March	(United Kingdom) Jackie Stewart	(France) Matra-Ford
(France) XXVIII Grand Prix Automobile de Pau	Pau	21 April	(United Kingdom) Jackie Stewart	(France) Matra-Ford
(West Germany) XXXI Internationales ADAC-Eifelrenenn	Nürburgring Südschleife	21 April	(United Kingdom) Chris Irwin	(United Kingdom) Lola-Ford
(Belgium) V Grote Prijs van Limborg	Zolder	5 May	(Austria) Jochen Rindt	(United Kingdom) Brabham-Ford
(West Germany) III Rhein-Pokalrennen	Hockenheimring	16 June	(Austria) Jochen Rindt	(United Kingdom) Brabham-Ford
(Italy) X Gran Premio della Lotteria di Monza	Monza	23 June	(United Kingdom) Jonathan Williams	(United Kingdom) Brabham-Ford
(France) XXXIV Grand Prix de Reims	Reims-Gueux	15 September	(United Kingdom) Jackie Stewart	(France) Matra-Ford
(France) XXVII Grand Prix d'Albi	Albi	20 October	(France) Henri Pescarolo	(France) Matra-Ford
