= March 712 =

Open-wheel Formula 2 race car

March 712 March 712M
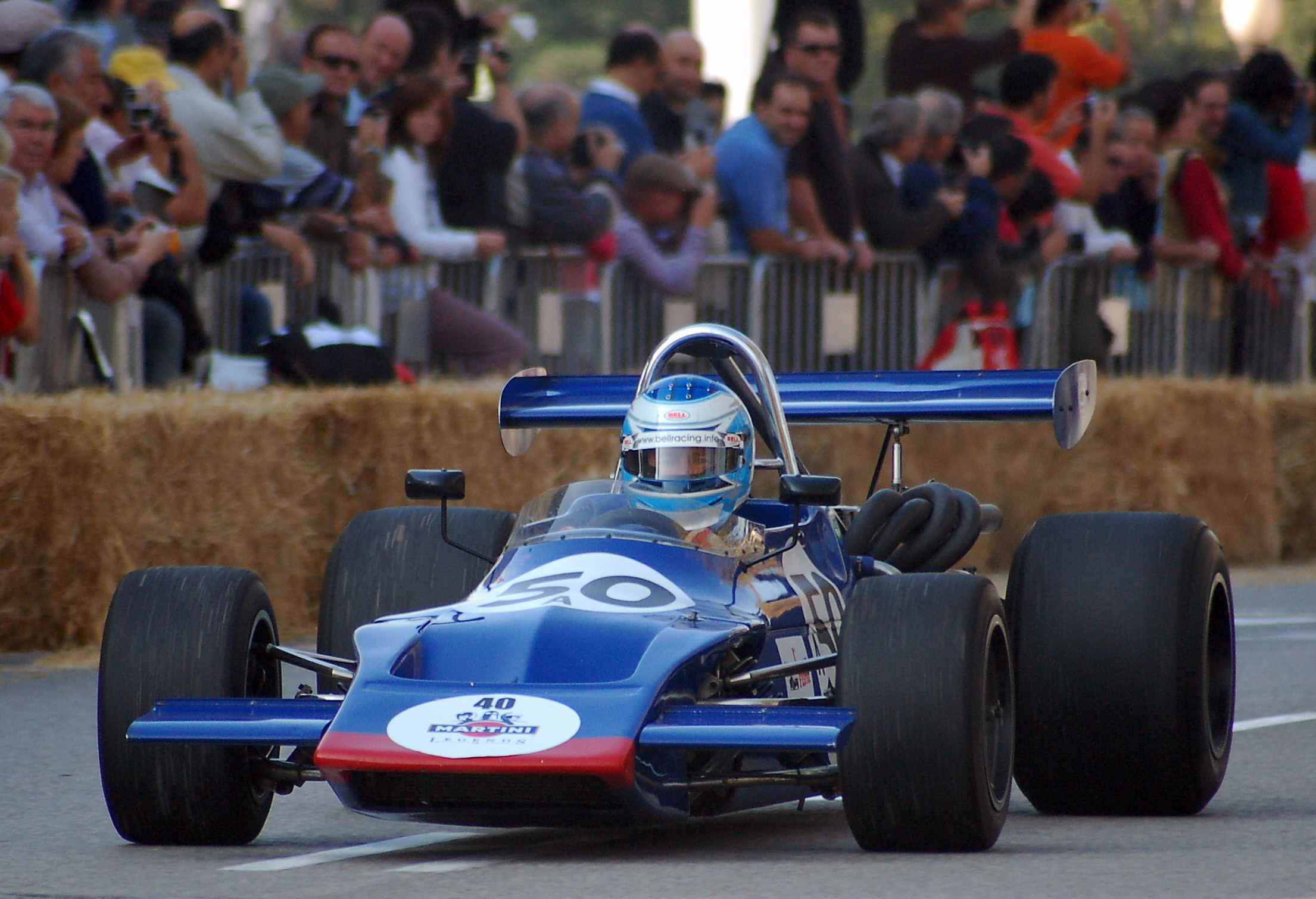
- March 712 of James Hunt
- Predecessor: March 702
- Successor: March 722

Technical specifications
- Engine: Ford-Cosworth FVA Straight-four engine BMW M12/7 Straight-four engine

Competition history
- Notable entrants: March Engineering; Frank Williams Racing Cars
- Notable drivers: (Sweden) Ronnie Peterson (United Kingdom) James Hunt (United Kingdom) Derek Bell
- Debut: 1971
Wins	Poles
5 (European F2 Championship races only)	8 (European F2 Championship races only)
- Drivers' Championships: 1971 (Ronnie Peterson)

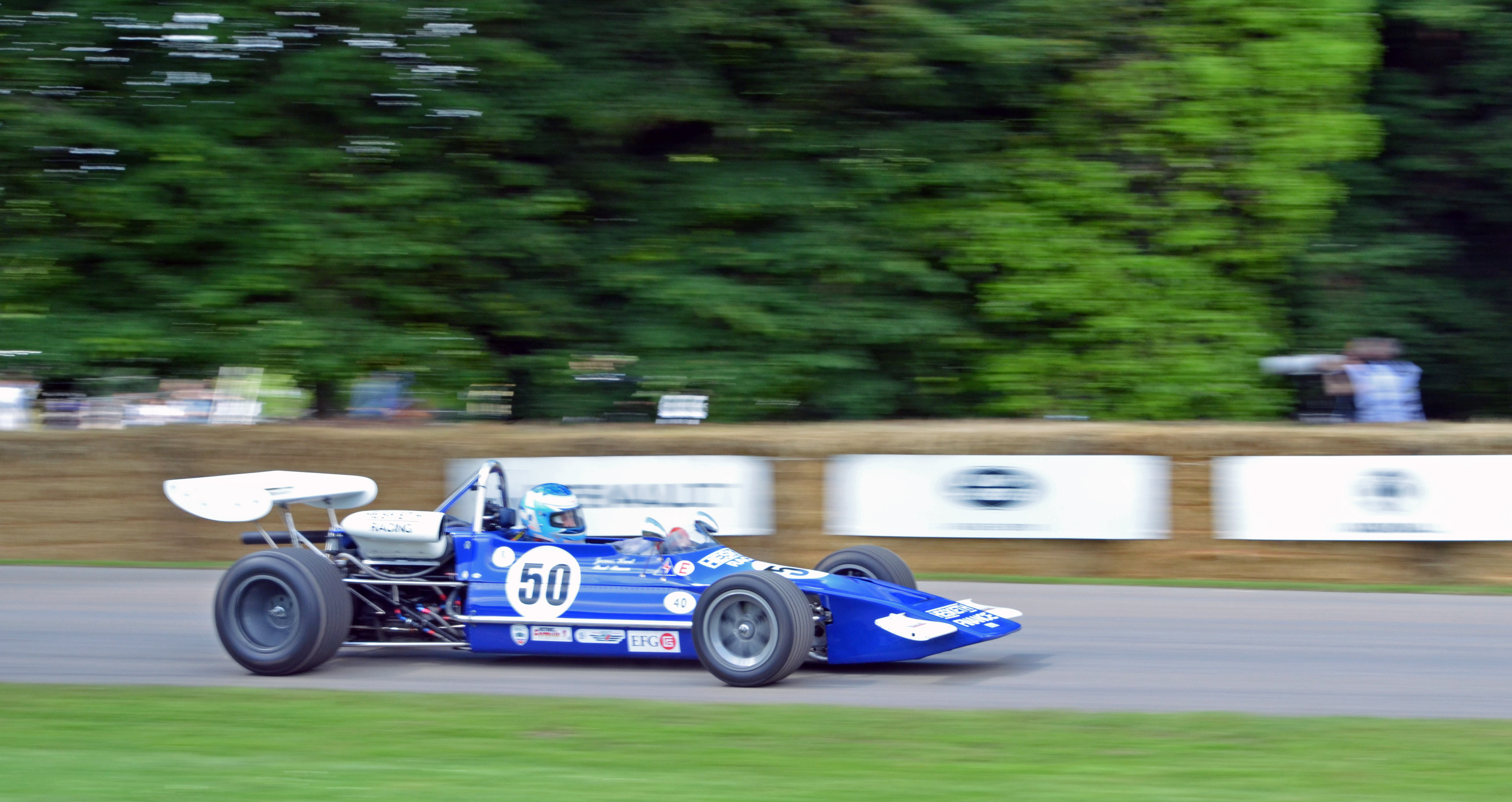
Side-view

The March 712 (and its derivative, the March 712M) was an open-wheel Formula 2 race car, designed, developed and built by British manufacturer March, in 1971. It was very successful, with Swede Ronnie Peterson winning the 1971 European F2 Championship season in a Cosworth-powered 712. Peterson won 5 races that season, and took 6 podium finishes, as well as taking 7 pole positions, and 5 fastest laps. Peterson finished the championship in first place, with 54 points. Austrian Dieter Quester, also driving a March 712, finished the championship in third place, with 31 points, driving a BMW-powered 712. The 712 was powered by either a Ford-Cosworth FVA, or a BMW M12/7; which were both naturally-aspirated 1.6 L (98 cu in) four-cylinder engines. A sister variant of the car, called the March 71B (and its derivative, the March 71BM), was the Formula B (Atlantic) version of the car.
