= Xavier Perrot =

Swiss racing driver (1932–2008)

- Born: 1 February 1932; Zürich, Switzerland
- Died: 8 December 2008 (aged 76); Zürich, Switzerland

Formula One World Championship career
- Nationality: Swiss
- Active years: 1969
- Team: non-works Brabham
- Entries: 1
- Championships: 0
- Wins: 0
- Podiums: 0
- Career points: 0
- Pole positions: 0
- Fastest laps: 0
- First entry: 1969 German Grand Prix
- Last entry: 1969 German Grand Prix

Xavier Roger Perrot (French: [ɡzavje ʁɔʒe pɛʁo]; 1 February 1932 – 8 December 2008) was a Swiss racing driver and garage owner, who won the European Hill Climb Championship in 1972. He had previously competed in Formula Two and drove his Brabham in the Formula Two class of the 1969 German Grand Prix.

== Career ==
After participating in national-level motorsport as a driver and rallying co-driver, Perrot began racing in hillclimbing in the early 1960s, campaigning cars such as a Lotus 23 and an Abarth-Simca. In 1968, he switched to Formula Two, driving a Brabham BT23C, and after a difficult first season, improved in 1969. He finished fourth in a non-championship race at Hockenheim and sixth in the Formula Two class of the German Grand Prix at the Nürburgring, and was classified tenth overall.

In 1970 Perrot campaigned a March 702, the first customer car sold by the company. With this car, he won the Preis von Deutschland Formula Two event at the Nürburgring. He continued in Formula Two in 1971 with a March 712M, finishing third at Imola, while also making a successful return to hillclimbing. He won the European Hill Climb Championship in 1972 using a March 722 F2 car, winning six events. He also raced this car occasionally in Formula Two, scoring points in three races, including fourth and fifth places in events at Hockenheim, and was classified 13th in the championship.

Although Perrot raced in the Formula Two class of a World Championship Formula One event, he never raced in a full Formula One World Championship race. He did however drive Jo Siffert's ex-works March 701 in the non-Championship 1971 Jochen Rindt Memorial Trophy race at Hockenheim, where he finished 11th.

Perrot retired in 1973 to concentrate on his garage business in his hometown of Zürich, where he died after a long illness in 2008, aged 76.

== Racing record ==
=== Complete Formula One World Championship results ===
(key)

Year	Entrant	Chassis	Engine	1	2	3	4	5	6	7	8	9	10	11	WDC	Points
1969	Squadra Tartaruga	Brabham BT23C (F2)	Cosworth Straight-4	RSA	ESP	MON	NED	FRA	GBR	GER; 10	ITA	CAN	USA	MEX	—	0

=== Complete Formula One non-championship results ===
(key)

Year	Entrant	Chassis	Engine	1	2	3	4	5	6	7	8
1971	Jo Siffert Automobiles	March 701	Cosworth DFV V8	ARG	ROC	QUE	SPR	INT	RIN; 11	OUL	VIC

=== Complete European Formula Two Championship results ===
(key)

Year	Entrant	Chassis	Engine	1	2	3	4	5	6	7	8	9	10	11	12	13	14	Pos.	Points
1968	Squadra Tartaruga	Brabham BT23	Cosworth FVA	HOC; 10	THR; NC	JAR	PAL; DNQ	TUL	ZAN; 12	PER	HOC; Ret	VAL						NC	0
1969	Squadra Tartaruga	Brabham BT23	Cosworth FVA	THR; 13	HOC	NÜR; Ret	JAR											13th	3
1969	Squadra Tartaruga	Brabham BT23C	Cosworth FVA					TUL; 8	PER	VAL; Ret								13th	3
1970	Squadra Tartaruga	March 702	Cosworth FVA	THR; 11	HOC; 9	BAR; Ret	ROU	PER	TUL; 9	IMO	HOC; Ret							NC	0
1971	Squadra Tartaruga	March 712M	Cosworth FVA	HOC; 8	THR; NC	NÜR; 19	JAR	PAL	ROU	MAN	TUL	ALB	VAL	VAL				NC	0
1972	Squadra Tartaruga	March 722	Cosworth BDE	MAL; 6	THR	HOC; 4	PAU	PAL	HOC; 5	ROU	ÖST	IMO	MAN	PER	SAL	ALB	HOC; Ret	13th	8
