= 1969 German Grand Prix =

- Race 7 of 11 in the 1969 Formula One season

Race details
- Date: 3 August 1969
- Official name: XXXI Großer Preis von Deutschland
- Location: Nürburgring; Nürburg, West Germany
- Course: Permanent racing facility
- Course length: 22.835 km (14.189 miles)
- Distance: 14 laps, 319.690 km (198.646 miles)

Pole position
Driver	(Belgium) Jacky Ickx	Brabham-Ford
- Time: 7:42.1

Fastest lap
Driver	(Belgium) Jacky Ickx	Brabham-Ford
- Time: 7:43.8 on lap 7

Podium
First	(Belgium) Jacky Ickx	Brabham-Ford
Second	(United Kingdom) Jackie Stewart	Matra-Ford
Third	(New Zealand) Bruce McLaren	McLaren-Ford

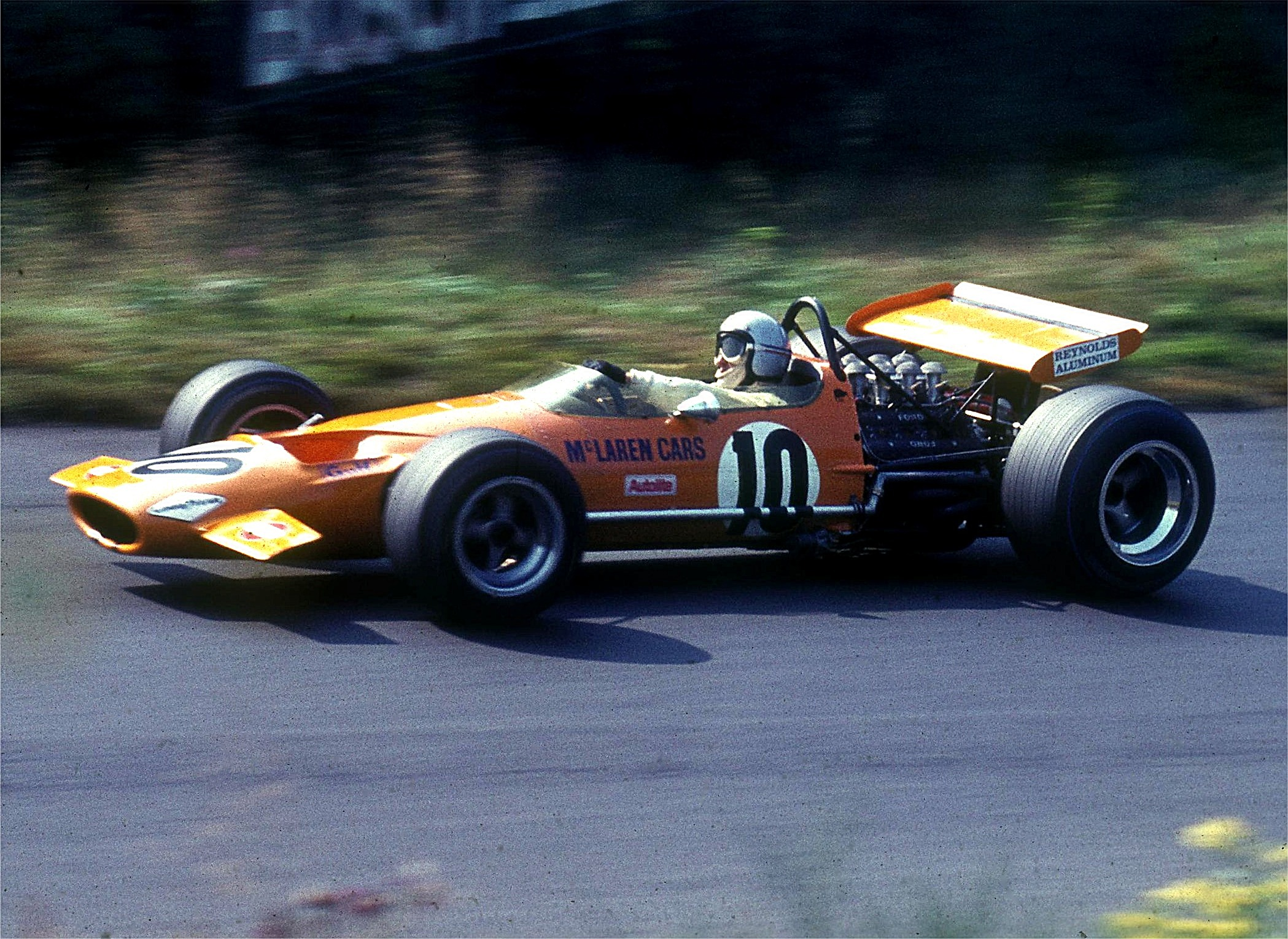
Bruce McLaren finished third driving the McLaren M7C.

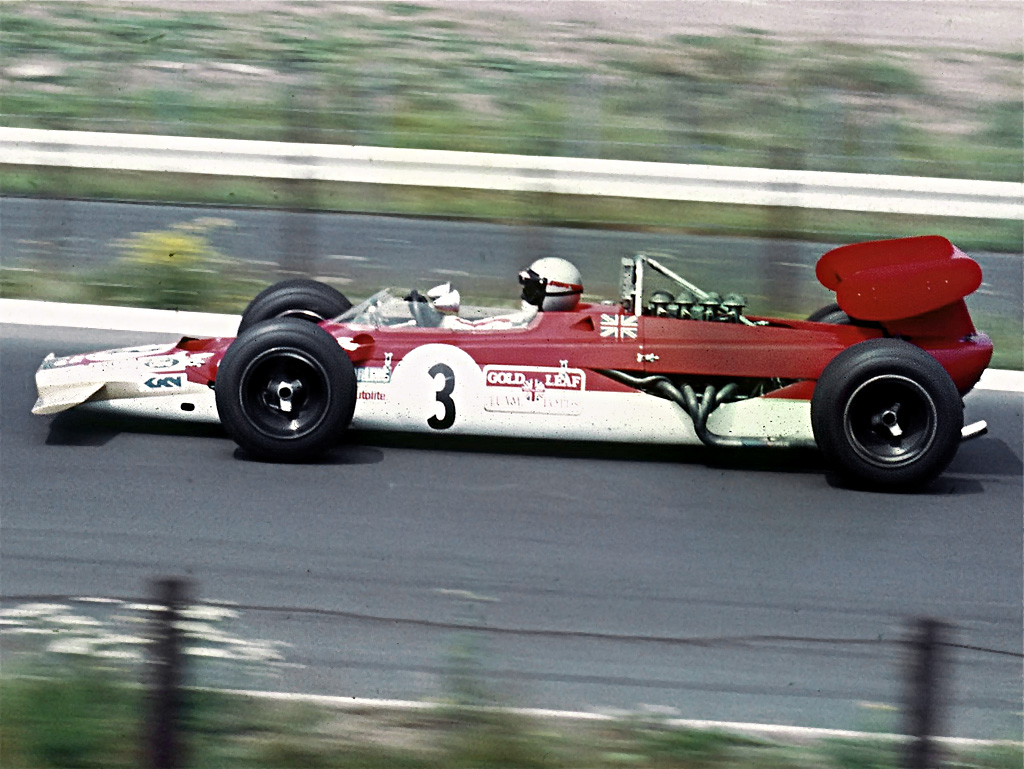
Mario Andretti drove a 4WD Lotus 63 in the race, but the heavy car crashed on the first lap.

The 1969 German Grand Prix was a Formula One motor race held at Nürburgring on 3 August 1969. It was race 7 of 11 in both the 1969 World Championship of Drivers and the 1969 International Cup for Formula One Manufacturers. Due to the long track and few laps, Formula Two cars were again allowed to enter the race, though they were not eligible to score WC points.

The 14-lap race was won by Belgian driver Jacky Ickx, driving a works Brabham BT26-Ford. Ickx took pole position, led the final eight laps and set the fastest lap of the race. Scotland's Jackie Stewart finished second in a Matra MS80-Ford, expanding his lead in the championship, with New Zealand's Bruce McLaren third in a McLaren M7A-Ford.

== Report ==
Ferrari withdrew to focus on the upcoming Italian GP. Practising in a BMW 269 F2, Gerhard Mitter was killed at Schwedenkreuz. As a suspension or steering failure was suspected, the BMW team with Hubert Hahne and Dieter Quester withdrew from the race, as did Mitter's teammate as Porsche factory sportscar driver, Hans Herrmann, who had entered on one of the Lotus 59 of Roy Winkelmann Racing. Udo Schütz, who often shared cars with Mitter for Porsche, retired from racing.

Mario Andretti drove the 4WD Lotus 63 for very few laps in practice. The heavy fuel load for the race made the car ground out in lap 1 after a jump at Wippermann, causing a crash that also took out Vic Elford, whose car flipped upside down and landed in the trees. Elford broke his arm in 3 places, thus Porsche had lost four factory drivers for the upcoming 1000km Zeltweg. On the other hand, Jo Siffert, Kurt Ahrens and Richard Attwood participated in the Grand Prix and drove privately entered Porsche 917 at Zeltweg, with Siffert/Ahrens winning.

In the race, Jacky Ickx had a very poor start which dropped him down to 9th, but he eventually passed the entire field over 3 laps, and he and Jackie Stewart battled for 4 laps until Ickx passed Stewart under braking for the first corner, the Südkehre. Stewart held on but then gearbox problems began to slow him and he dropped away, leaving Ickx in a dominant position. Piers Courage had an accident at Breidscheid when he slipped on some oil and crashed into a ditch next to the Adenauer bridge. Luckily, he was unhurt.

Only four F1 cars finished, ahead of several F2. Two F1 received points despite being out.

This was the last Formula One race at the original bumpy Green Hell Nürburgring lined with hedges. In 1970, Bruce McLaren and Piers Courage died in June. GP drivers, who in 1969 had boycotted Spa but raced there in 1970 after armco were installed, demanded similar upgrades at the Nürburgring, which as combined Nordschleife and Südschleife was more than twice as long as the old Circuit de Spa-Francorchamps. German organizers were either not able or not willing to match the demands, thus drivers boycotted and the 1970 German Grand Prix moved for the first time to the Hockenheimring, where a modern stadium section had been built in 1965. Later in 1970 and in early 1971, the Nordschleife of the Nürburgring was rebuilt and fitted with Armco barriers. Some of the bumps were ironed out, like the one at Brünnchen. F1 signed a three year contract starting with the 1971 race, and later another three year contract that expired after 1976.

== Classification ==
=== Qualifying ===
Pos	No	Driver	Constructor	Time	Gap	Grid
1	6	(Belgium) Jacky Ickx	Brabham-Ford	7:42.1	—	1
2	7	(United Kingdom) Jackie Stewart	Matra-Ford	7:42.4	+0.3	2
3	2	(Austria) Jochen Rindt	Lotus-Ford	7:48.0	+5.9	3
4	11	(Switzerland) Jo Siffert	Lotus-Ford	7:50.3	+8.2	4
5	9	(New Zealand) Denny Hulme	McLaren-Ford	7:52.8	+10.7	5
6	12	(United Kingdom) Vic Elford	McLaren-Ford	7:54.8	+12.7	6
7	17	(United Kingdom) Piers Courage	Brabham-Ford	7:56.1	+14.0	7
8	10	(New Zealand) Bruce McLaren	McLaren-Ford	7:56.5	+14.4	8
9	1	(United Kingdom) Graham Hill	Lotus-Ford	7:57.0	+14.9	9
10	8	(France) Jean-Pierre Beltoise	Matra-Ford	8:00.3	+18.2	10
11	27	(France) Johnny Servoz-Gavin	Matra-Ford	8:11.1	+29.0	15
12	14	(United Kingdom) John Surtees	BRM	8:12.1	+30.0	11
13	28	(France) François Cevert	Tecno-Ford	8:13.9	+31.8	16
14	26	(France) Henri Pescarolo	Matra-Ford	8:14.8	+32.7	17
15	3	(United States) Mario Andretti	Lotus-Ford	8:15.4	+33.3	12
16	15	(United Kingdom) Jackie Oliver	BRM	8:16.2	+34.1	13
17	23	(West Germany) Hubert Hahne	BMW	8:19.5	+37.4	WD
18	31	(United Kingdom) Peter Westbury	Brabham-Ford	8:20.0	+37.9	18
19	20	(West Germany) Kurt Ahrens	Brabham-Ford	8:23.2	+41.1	19
20	29	(United Kingdom) Richard Attwood	Brabham-Ford	8:24.6	+42.5	20
21	25	(Austria) Dieter Quester	BMW	8:26.8	+44.7	WD
22	22	(West Germany) Rolf Stommelen	Lotus-Ford	8:28.1	+46.0	21
23	16	(Sweden) Jo Bonnier	Lotus-Ford	8:35.0	+52.9	14
24	30	(Switzerland) Xavier Perrot	Brabham-Ford	8:35.4	+53.3	22
25	24	(West Germany) Gerhard Mitter	BMW	8:36.5	+54.4	DNS
26	21	(West Germany) Hans Herrmann	Lotus-Ford	8:50.3	+1:08.2	WD

=== Race ===
Pos	No	Driver	Constructor	Laps	Time/Retired	Grid	Points
1	6	(Belgium) Jacky Ickx	Brabham-Ford	14	1:49:55.4	1	9
2	7	(United Kingdom) Jackie Stewart	Matra-Ford	14	+57.7	2	6
3	10	(New Zealand) Bruce McLaren	McLaren-Ford	14	+3:21.6	8	4
4	1	(United Kingdom) Graham Hill	Lotus-Ford	14	+3:58.8	9	3
5	26	(France) Henri Pescarolo	Matra-Ford	14	+7:11.0	17	
6	29	(United Kingdom) Richard Attwood	Brabham-Ford	13	+1 lap	20	
7	20	(West Germany) Kurt Ahrens	Brabham-Ford	13	+1 lap	19	
8	22	(West Germany) Rolf Stommelen	Lotus-Ford	13	+1 lap	21	
9	31	(United Kingdom) Peter Westbury	Brabham-Ford	13	+1 lap	18	
10	30	(Switzerland) Xavier Perrot	Brabham-Ford	13	+1 lap	22	
11	11	(Switzerland) Jo Siffert	Lotus-Ford	12	Suspension/accident	4	2
12	8	(France) Jean-Pierre Beltoise	Matra-Ford	12	Suspension	10	1
Ret	9	(New Zealand) Denny Hulme	McLaren-Ford	11	Transmission	5	
Ret	15	(United Kingdom) Jackie Oliver	BRM	11	Oil leak	13	
Ret	2	(Austria) Jochen Rindt	Lotus-Ford	10	Ignition	3	
Ret	28	(France) François Cevert	Tecno-Ford	9	Crown wheel	15	
Ret	27	(France) Johnny Servoz-Gavin	Matra-Ford	6	Engine	16	
Ret	16	(Sweden) Jo Bonnier	Lotus-Ford	4	Fuel leak	15	
Ret	17	(United Kingdom) Piers Courage	Brabham-Ford	1	Accident	7	
Ret	12	(United Kingdom) Vic Elford	McLaren-Ford	0	Accident	6	
Ret	3	(United States) Mario Andretti	Lotus-Ford	0	Accident	12	
DNS	14	(United Kingdom) John Surtees	BRM		Non-starter	11	
DNS	24	(West Germany) Gerhard Mitter	BMW		Fatal accident in practice		
WD	23	(West Germany) Hubert Hahne	BMW		Withdrew		
WD	25	(Austria) Dieter Quester	BMW		Withdrew		
WD	21	(West Germany) Hans Herrmann	Lotus-Ford		Withdrew		

- Formula Two entrants are denoted by a pink background. They were not eligible for World Championship points.

== Notes ==
- Having suffered many DNF already, Ferrari decided to skip the German GP, to prepare for the home race at Monza
- This was the Formula One World Championship debut for German driver Rolf Stommelen, Austrian driver Dieter Quester, French driver and future Grand Prix winner François Cevert, Swiss driver Xavier Perrot and British driver Peter Westbury.
- This race saw the first fastest lap and Grand Slam set by a Belgian driver.
- This was the Formula One World Championship debut for Italian constructor Tecno.
- This race saw the 10th fastest lap being set by a Brabham.
- This was the 10th podium finish by a McLaren.

== Championship standings after the race ==
Drivers' Championship standings

	Pos	Driver	Points
	1	(United Kingdom) Jackie Stewart	51
3	2	(Belgium) Jacky Ickx	22
1	3	(New Zealand) Bruce McLaren	21
1	4	(United Kingdom) Graham Hill	19
1	5	(Switzerland) Jo Siffert	15

Constructors' Championship standings

	Pos	Constructor	Points
	1	(France) Matra-Ford	51
2	2	(United Kingdom) Brabham-Ford	28
1	3	(United Kingdom) Lotus-Ford	28
1	4	(United Kingdom) McLaren-Ford	24 (26)
	5	(Italy) Ferrari	4

- Note: Only the top five positions are included for both sets of standings. Only the best 5 results from the first 6 rounds and the best 4 results from the last 5 rounds counted towards the Championship. Numbers without parentheses are Championship points; numbers in parentheses are total points scored.

Previous race: 1969 British Grand Prix	FIA Formula One World Championship; 1969 season	Next race: 1969 Italian Grand Prix
Previous race: 1968 German Grand Prix	German Grand Prix	Next race: 1970 German Grand Prix
