= March 702 =

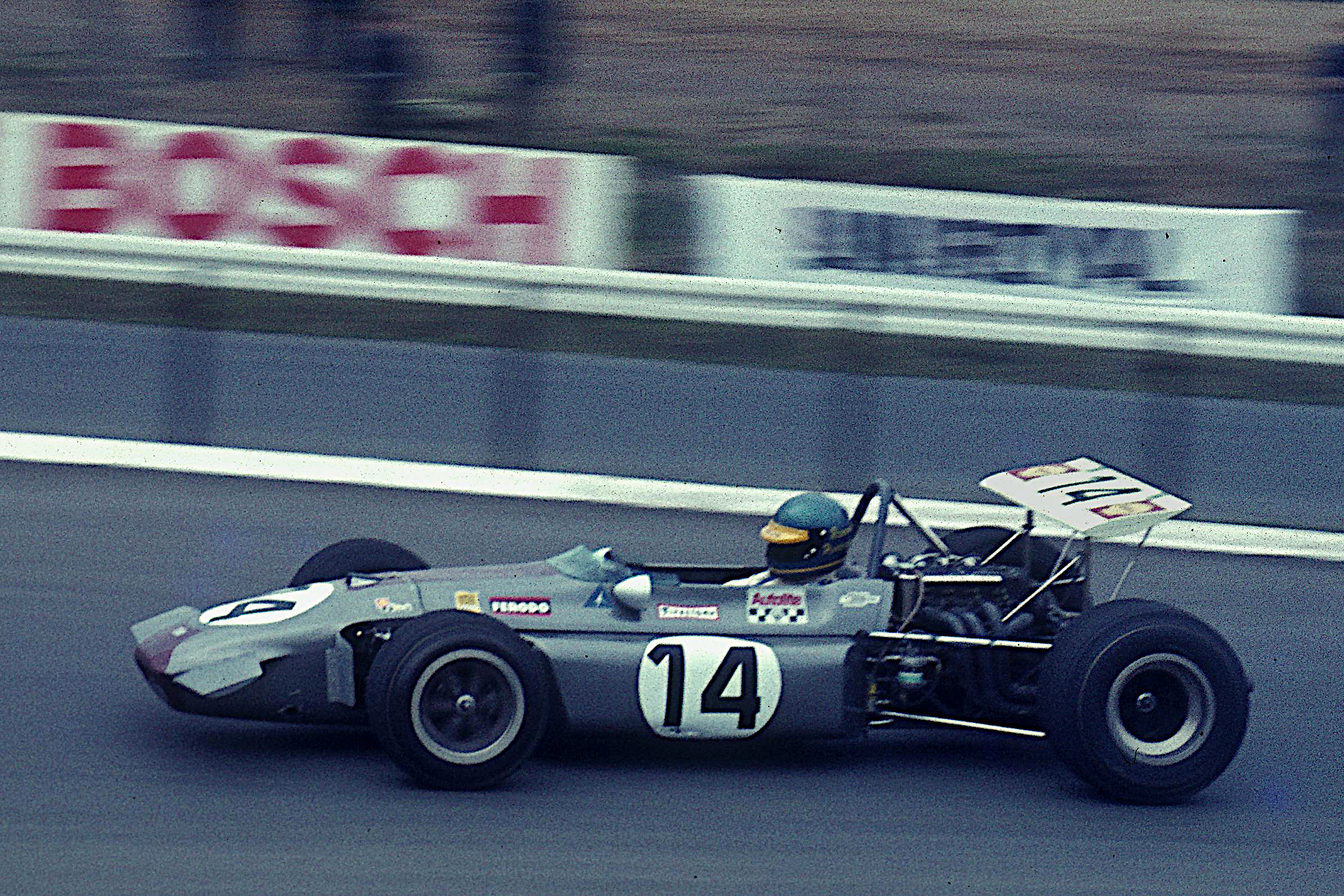
- Ronnie Peterson in the March 702 at the 1970 Eifel race
- Successor: March 712

Technical specifications
- Engine: Cosworth FVA

Competition history
- Notable drivers: (Sweden) Ronnie Peterson (Sweden) Xavier Perrot
| Wins | Podiums |
|---|---|
| 1 | 3 |

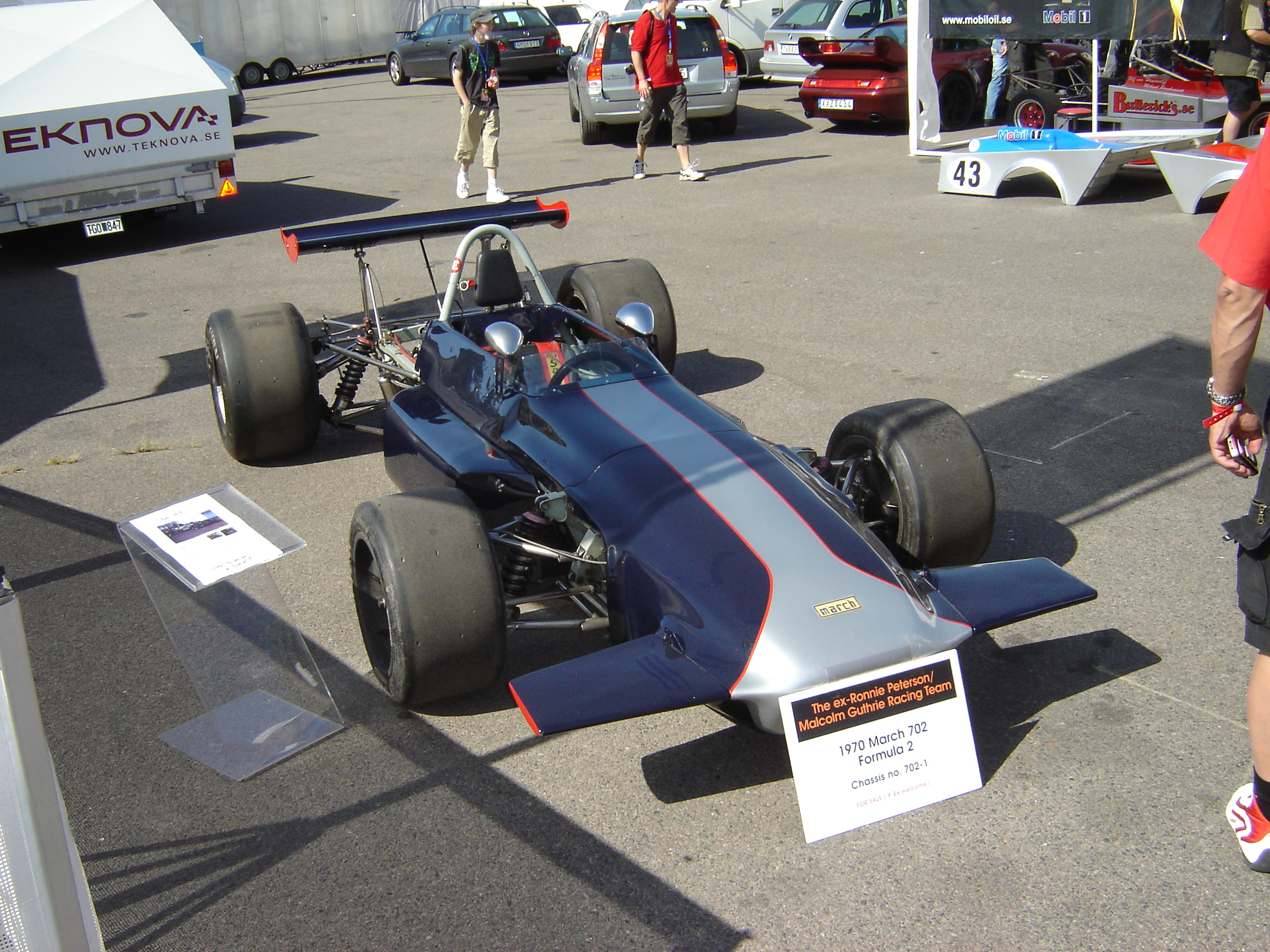
March 702 of Ronnie Peterson.

The March 702 was a Formula 2 racing car and was built by March Engineering in 1970.

== Development history and technology ==
The March 702 was the first-ever Formula 2 car built by March. The vehicle was based on the March 693 Formula 3 racing car from 1969. For Formula 2, the frame tubes were reinforced, which put the weight of the car at the upper limit. A Cosworth FVA engine was used as the drive. After a year of development work and building a lighter chassis, the car became competitive at the end of the season.

== Racing history ==
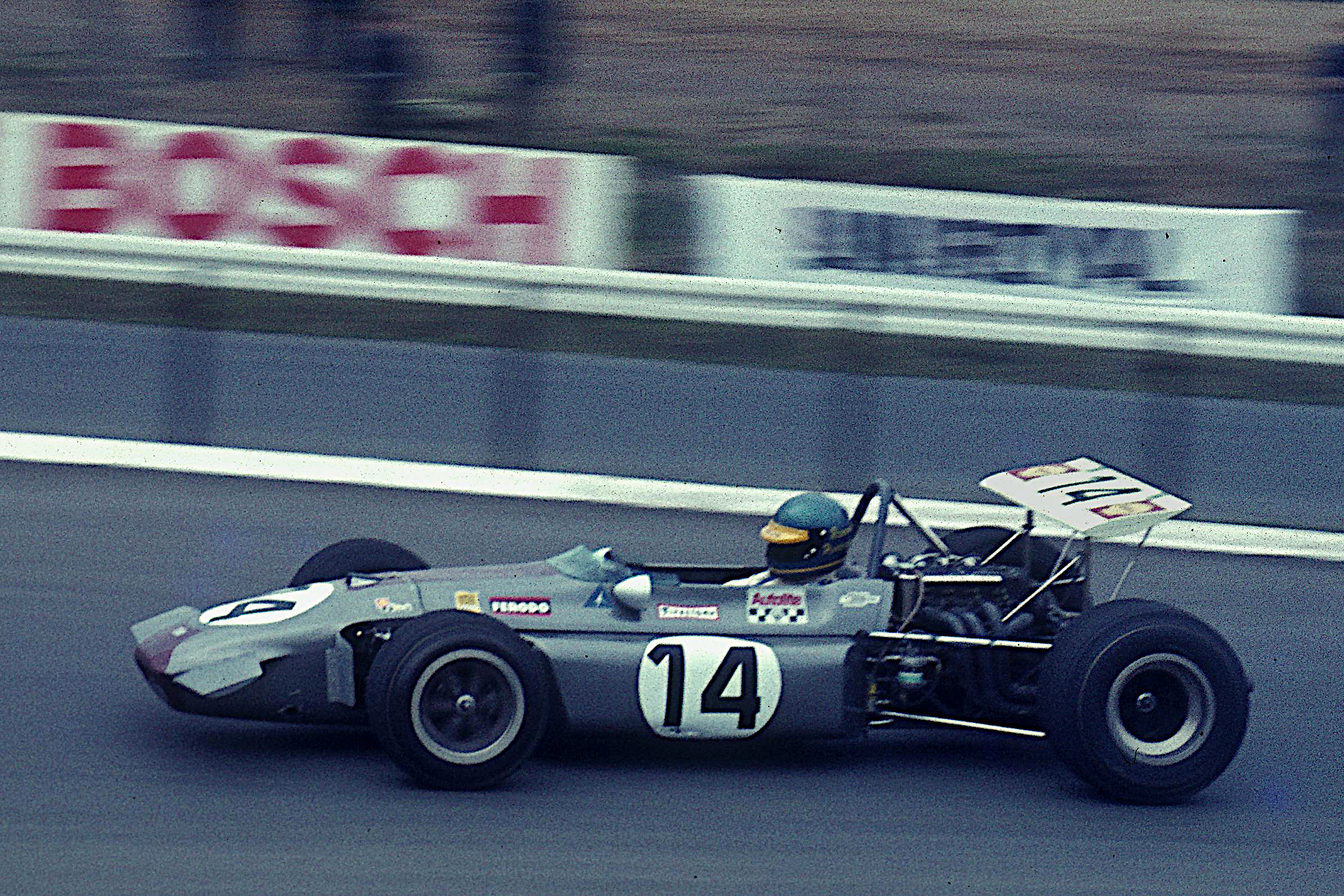
Ronnie Peterson in the March 702 at the 1970 Eifel race

Swiss Xavier Perrot achieved the 702's only win in 1970 at the Nürburgring. Perrot won the substitute race for the German Grand Prix, which was moved to Hockenheim, ahead of Hannelore Werner, who also drove a March 702. Werner's second place was the best finish ever achieved by a woman in a Formula 2 car.

Ronnie Peterson achieved 3rd place at the Hockenheimring with Malcolm Guthrie Racing in round 8.
