= Tulln-Langenlebarn Airfield Circuit =

Airfield circuit, Tulln an der Donau, Austria

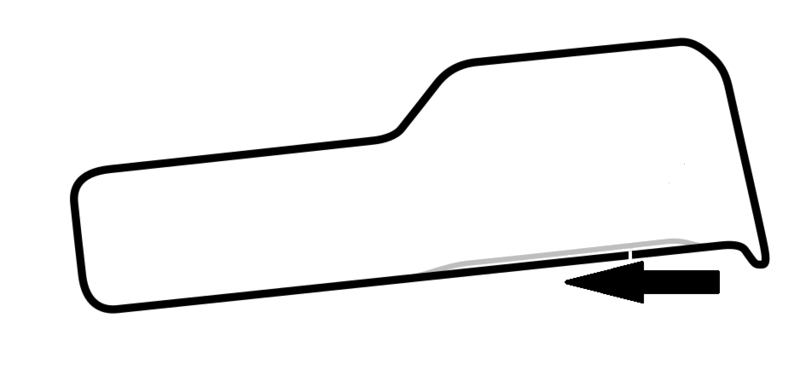
- Full Circuit (1966–1971)
- Location: Tulln an der Donau, Lower Austria, Austria
- Coordinates: 48°19′16″N 16°6′43″E
- Capacity: 20,000
- Operator: Österreichischer Automobil-, Motorrad- und Touring Club
- Opened: 2 October 1966; 59 years ago
- Closed: 12 September 1971; 54 years ago
- Major events: European Formula Two Championship (1967–1971)

Full Circuit (1966–1971)
- Surface: Concrete
- Length: 2.864 km (1.780 mi)
- Turns: 7
- Race lap record: 1:01.600 ( (France) François Cevert, Tecno TF70, 1970, F2)

Tulln-Langenlebarn Airfield Circuit was a 2.864 km (1.780 mi) former airfield circuit located on the Brumowski Air Base in Tulln an der Donau, was 33 km (21 mi) northwest of Vienna.

The circuit was opened in October 1966 for a national sports car race, later it also hosted races of the European Formula Two Championship until September 1971. The circuit was closed due to the venue change of the Formula Two race in 1972 to Österreichring.

The circuit was an airfield circuit like the Zeltweg Air Base, it had a concrete surface, a 1.1 km (0.68 mi) long start-finish straight and a minimum width of 12 m (39 ft).

== Lap records ==
The fastest official race lap records at the Tulln-Langenlebarn Airfield Circuit are listed as:

Category	Time	Driver	Vehicle	Event
Full Circuit (1966–1971): 2.864 km (1.780 mi)
Formula Two	1:01.600	François Cevert	Tecno TF70	1970 Tulln European F2 round
Group 4	1:12.820	Hans Herrmann	Porsche 906	1966 Flugplatzrennen Tulln-Langenlebarn
Sports car racing	1:20.750	Rico Steinemann	Lotus Elan	1966 Flugplatzrennen Tulln-Langenlebarn
