= Brabham BT23 =

Formula racing car by Brabham

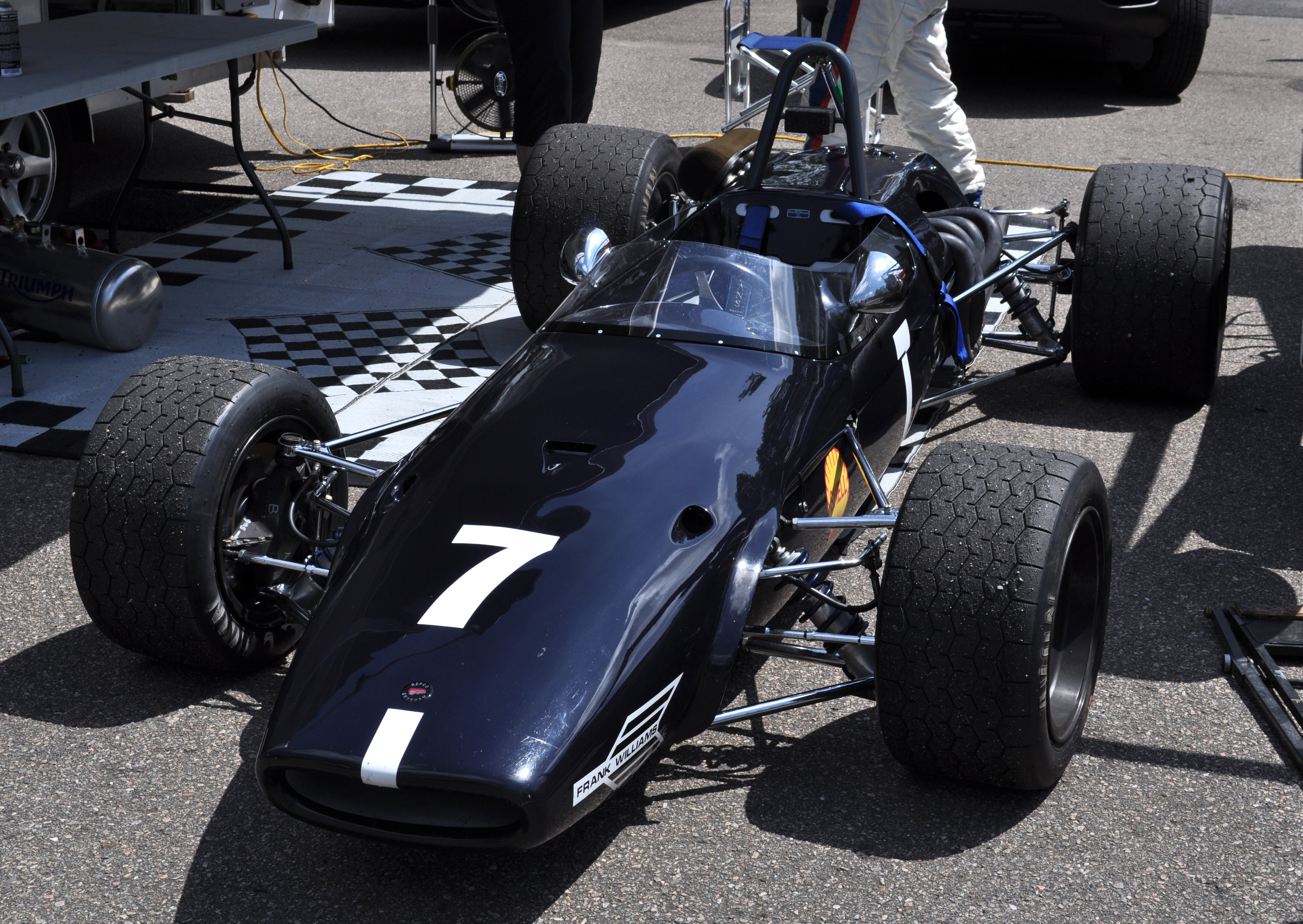
Brabham BT23C

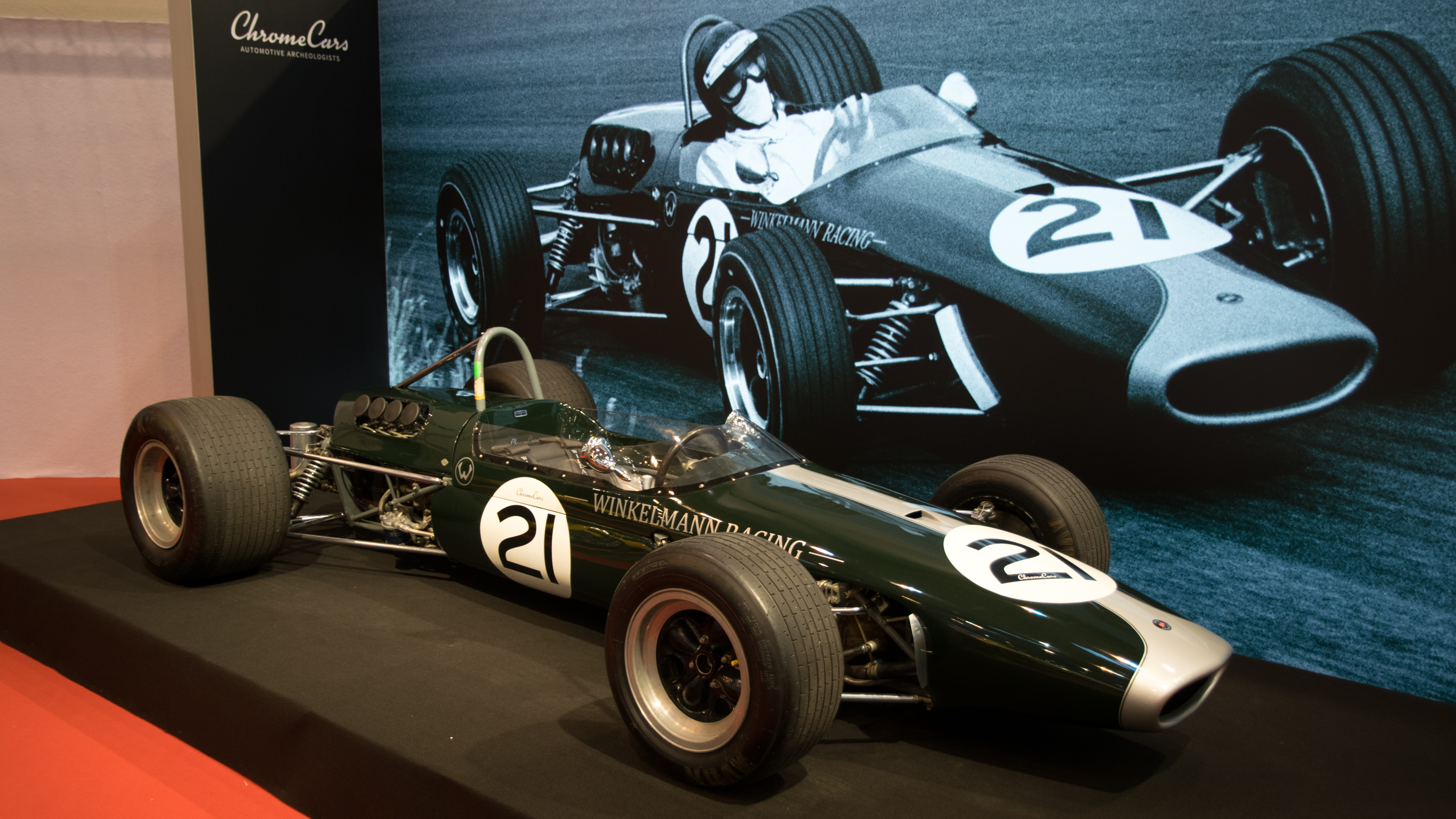
Brabham BT23 of Jochen Rindt

The Brabham BT23 was a formula racing car built by Brabham in 1967.

== Development ==
The BT23 was designed as a Formula 2 racing car and most of the vehicles of this type were also used in this racing series. There was also a Tasman version and some BT23s were converted for Formula One by private drivers.

== Design ==
The car was equipped with a tubular chassis in space-frame configuration, while the engine that equipped it was a Ford-Cosworth FVA, a 4-cylinder in-line of 1,598 cm^{3} capable of delivering a maximum power of 200–220 bhp (150–160 kW), which droves the rear wheels through a F.T.200 Hewland five-speed manual gearbox. The suspension consisted of double wishbones, coaxial coil springs, and a stabilizer bar in the front section and inverted lower wishbones, trailing arms, coil springs, and stabilizer bars in the rear section. The braking system consisted of four disc brakes.

The car had a space frame, which was reinforced by load-bearing plates in the Tasman version. Jochen Rindt dominated the 1967 and 1968 Formula 2 seasons with the BT23 at will. He won nine rounds out of 15 in 1967, but, being an A driver, did not score points for the European Drivers' Championship.

== Racing history ==
Top drivers including Derek Bell, Kurt Ahrens, Piers Courage, Peter Gethin, and Robin Widdows piloted the BT23. In 1969, motorcycle racer Bill Ivy started his Formula 2 career in a BT23. Jochen Rindt found considerable success in it, winning 9 out of the 15 races in 1967.

A BT23 also saw service in Australian open wheel racing with Alec Mildren Racing having one (painted in Mildren's traditional yellow) for their drivers Frank Gardner and Kevin Bartlett. At first the BT23D was powered by a 2.5L Coventry Climax engine. However, as team boss Alec Mildren was also the official Australian importer for Alfa Romeo, he was able to obtain via the Autodelta the same 2.5 L (2,462 cc) V8 engine as used in the Alfa Romeo T33/2 Daytona endurance racing sports car. Bartlett won the 1968 Australian Drivers' Championships in the Brabham BT23D Alfa Romeo taking 3 wins (Lakeside, Surfers Paradise and Warwick Farm) and 1 second (Mallala) in the 6 race series. The car also contested the Tasman Series with Frank Gardner finishing 4th (with the Lotus 49T-Ford of Graham Hill) in 1968 including finishing 2nd in the New Zealand Grand Prix at Pukekohe, and Kevin Bartlett finishing 9th (contesting only the Australian rounds of the series) in 1969 with the car now dubbed the BT23E.

The Coventry Climax engine in the Mildren run Brabham produced approximately 250 bhp (186 kW; 253 PS) while the Alfa Romeo V8 produced approximately 315 bhp (235 kW; 319 PS).

== Formula One World Championship results ==
Year	Entrant	Chassis	Engine	Tyres	Drivers	1	2	3	4	5	6	7	8	9	10	11	WCC	Points
1967	Gerhard Mitter	BT23	Cosworth FVA 1.6 L4	D		RSA	MON	NED	BEL	FRA	GBR	GER	CAN	ITA	USA	MEX	—N/a*	
1967	Gerhard Mitter	BT23	Cosworth FVA 1.6 L4	D	(West Germany) Gerhard Mitter							Ret					—N/a*	
1967	Roy Winkelmann Racing	BT23	Cosworth FVA 1.6 L4	F	(United Kingdom) Alan Rees							7					—N/a*	
1969	Squadra Tartaruga	BT23C	Cosworth FVA 1.6 L4	F		RSA	ESP	MON	NED	FRA	GBR	GER	ITA	CAN	USA	MEX	—N/a*	
1969	Squadra Tartaruga	BT23C	Cosworth FVA 1.6 L4	F	(Switzerland) Xavier Perrot							10					—N/a*	
1969	Paul Seitz	BT23B	Climax FPF 2.8 L4	F	(Canada) John Cordts									Ret			NC	0

* The entries in the 1967 and 1969 German Grands Prix were in the Formula 2 class and were therefore ineligible for World Championship points or classification.

== Formula One Non-Championship results ==
Year	Entrant	Chassis	Engine	Tyres	Drivers	1	2	3	4	5	6
1967	Roy Winkelmann Racing	BT23	Cosworth FVA 1.6 L4	F		ROC	SPC	INT	SYR	OUL	ESP
1967	Roy Winkelmann Racing	BT23	Cosworth FVA 1.6 L4	F	(Austria) Jochen Rindt					6	
1967	Roy Winkelmann Racing	BT23	Cosworth FVA 1.6 L4	F	(United Kingdom) Alan Rees					7	10
1967	Witley Racing Syndicate	BT23	Cosworth FVA 1.6 L4	F	(United Kingdom) Robin Widdows					Ret	
1967	George Pitt	BT23B	Climax FPF 2.8 L4	F	(United Kingdom) George Pitt		DNA			10	
1968	P&M Racing Preparations	BT23B	Climax FPF 2.8 L4	F		ROC	INT	OUL			
1968	P&M Racing Preparations	BT23B	Climax FPF 2.8 L4	F	(United Kingdom) Tony Lanfranchi	7	Ret				
1969	Antique Automobiles	BT23B	Climax FPF 2.8 L4	D		ROC	INT	MAD	OUL		
1969	Antique Automobiles	BT23B	Climax FPF 2.8 L4	D	(United States) Roy Pike	DNS					
1969	Graham McRae	BT23C	Cosworth FVA 1.6 L4		(New Zealand) Graham McRae			DNA			
