= Tecno (motorsport) =

Italian kart and racing car constructor

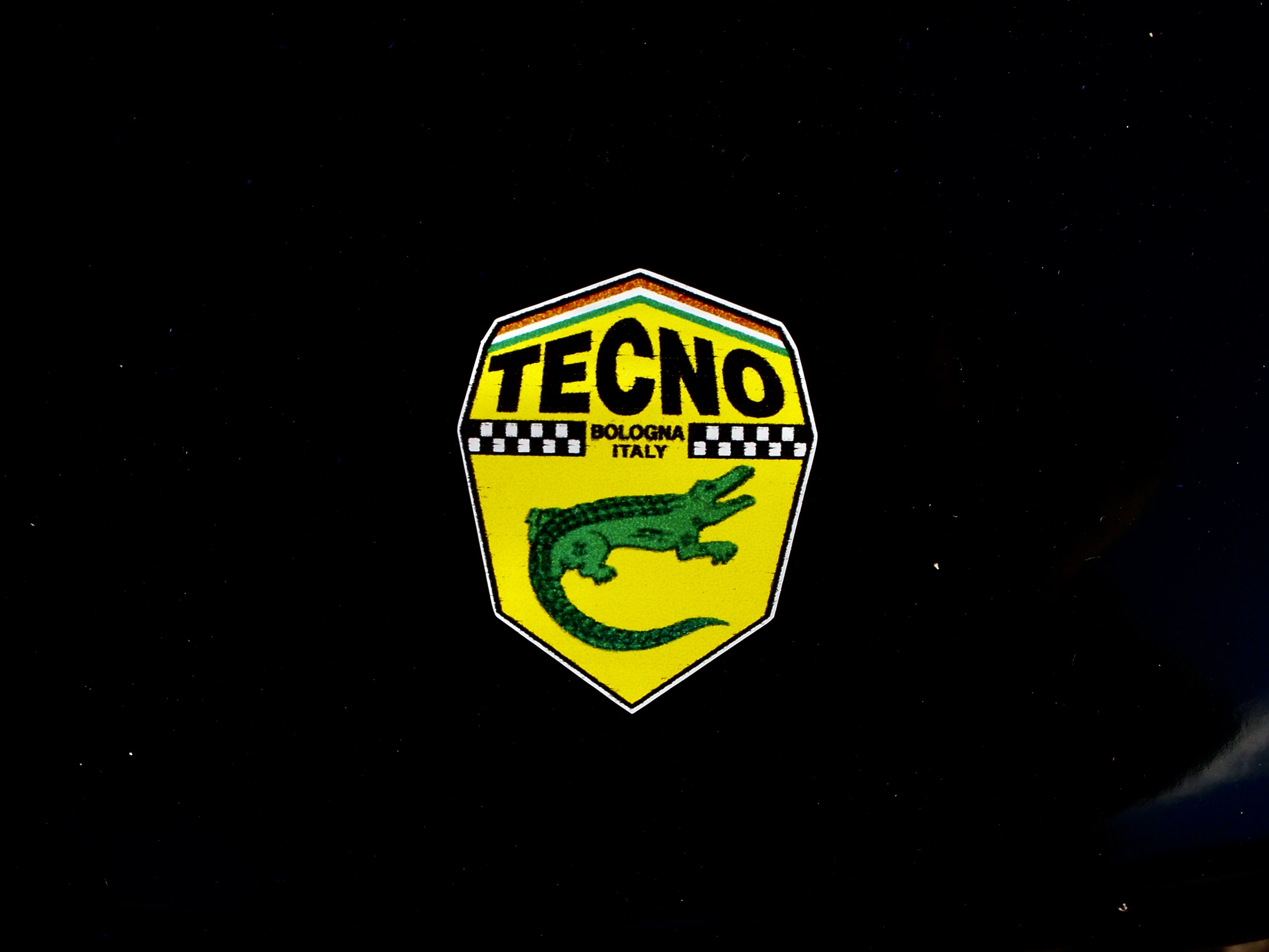
- Full name: Tecno Racing Team
- Base: Bologna, Italy
- Founder(s): Luciano Pederzani; Gianfranco Pederzani
- Noted staff: Gordon Fowell, Alan McCall, David Yorke, Giuseppe Bocchi, Ron Tauranac
- Noted drivers: (Italy) Nanni Galli (United Kingdom) Derek Bell (New Zealand) Chris Amon

Formula One World Championship career
- First entry: 1972 Belgian Grand Prix
- Races entered: 10
- Constructors' Championships: 0 (best finish: 11th, 1973)
- Drivers' Championships: 0
- Race victories: 0 (best finish: 6th, 1973 Belgian Grand Prix)
- Pole positions: 0 (best grid position: 12th, 1973 Monaco Grand Prix)
- Fastest laps: 0
- Final entry: 1973 Austrian Grand Prix

Tecno is an Italian kart and former racing car constructor based in Bologna. It won the European Formula Two Championship in 1970 and became a Formula One constructor, participating in 10 grands prix and scoring one championship point.

== History ==
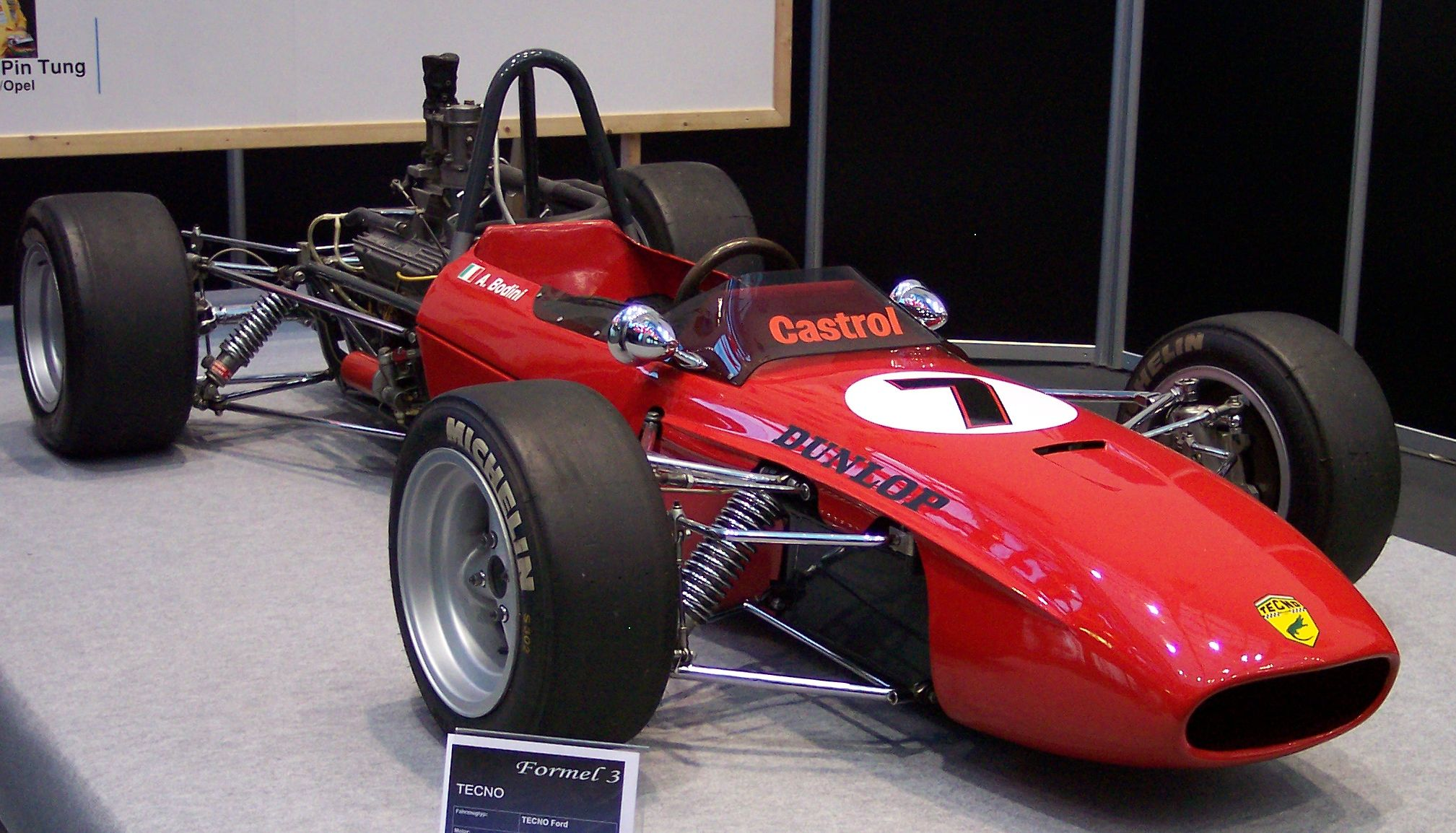
Tecno Aleste Bodini 1967 Formula 3 car

Tecno started out as an engineering business in Bologna manufacturing hydraulic pumps. In 1961, the company's owners, brothers Luciano and Gianfranco Pederzani, decided to enter motor sport as constructors of karts. In 1966 the company moved on up into car racing with Formula 3. Swiss driver Clay Regazzoni scored Tecno's first international win in Spain in 1967 and by the end of the year Tecno had won 32 of the season's 65 major F3 races. Tecno was the first company to build an offset ('sidewinder') kart chassis to take advantage of the newly developed air-cooled rotary motors produced by Parilla. Tecno's first chassis was named the Kaimano (a play on the Italian word for the Camen crocodile and the source of the logo). The Kaimano's design was based on the American rear-engine karts of the early 1960s. The second chassis, the Piuma ('Feather'), revolutionized karting design, and was so successful that it won the World Championships in 1964, 1965 and 1966. In 1969 Ronnie Peterson drove for the team, winning 15 races. In 1970 Tecno debuted in Formula 2 and won that year's championship with Regazzoni.

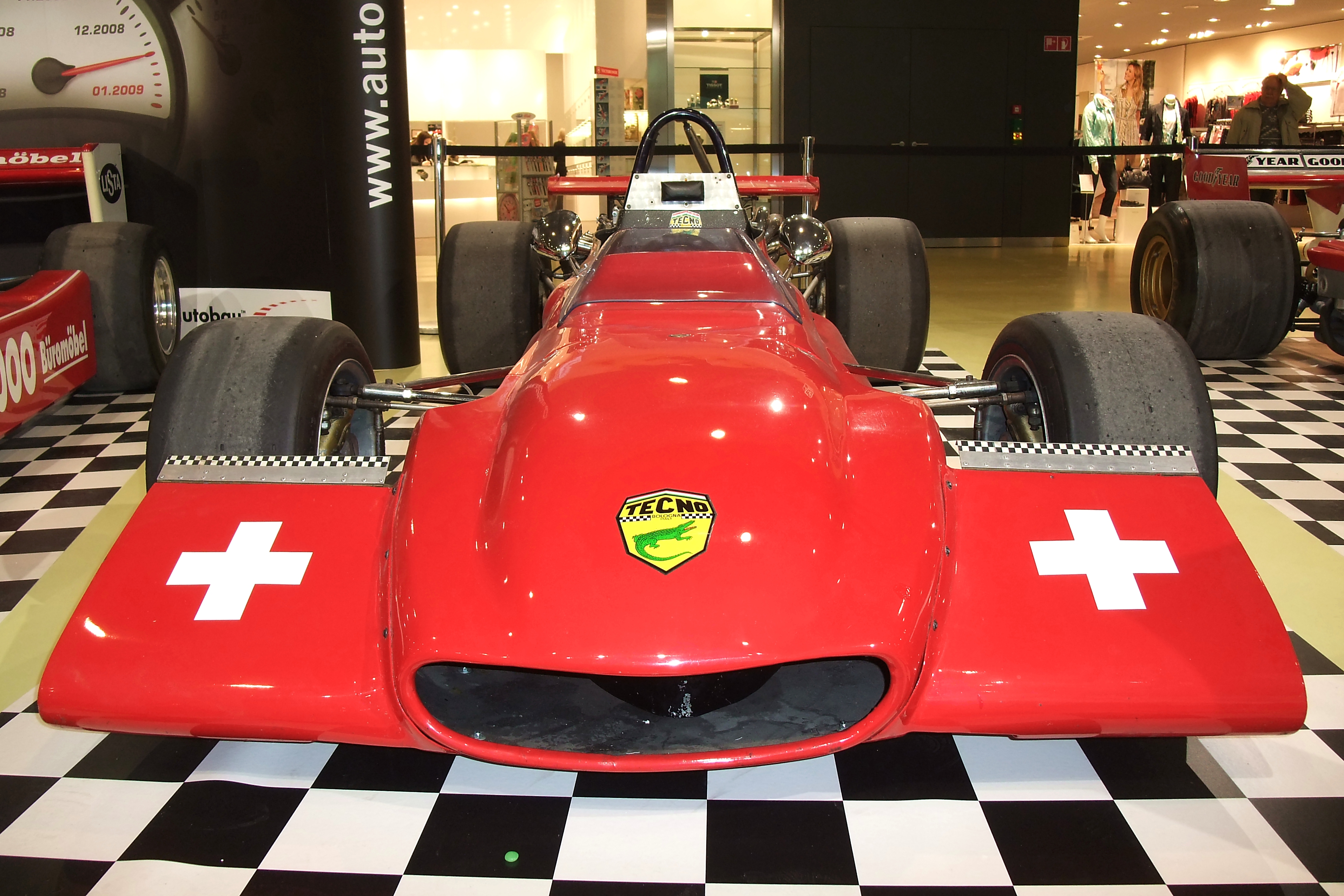
Tecno 70 F2 front-view

Tecno's success in junior formulae stirred the interest of Count Teofilo Guiscardo Rossi di Montelera (of Martini & Rossi fame), who became a partner and title sponsor of the Pederzani brothers in an attempt to build a Formula One car and engine.

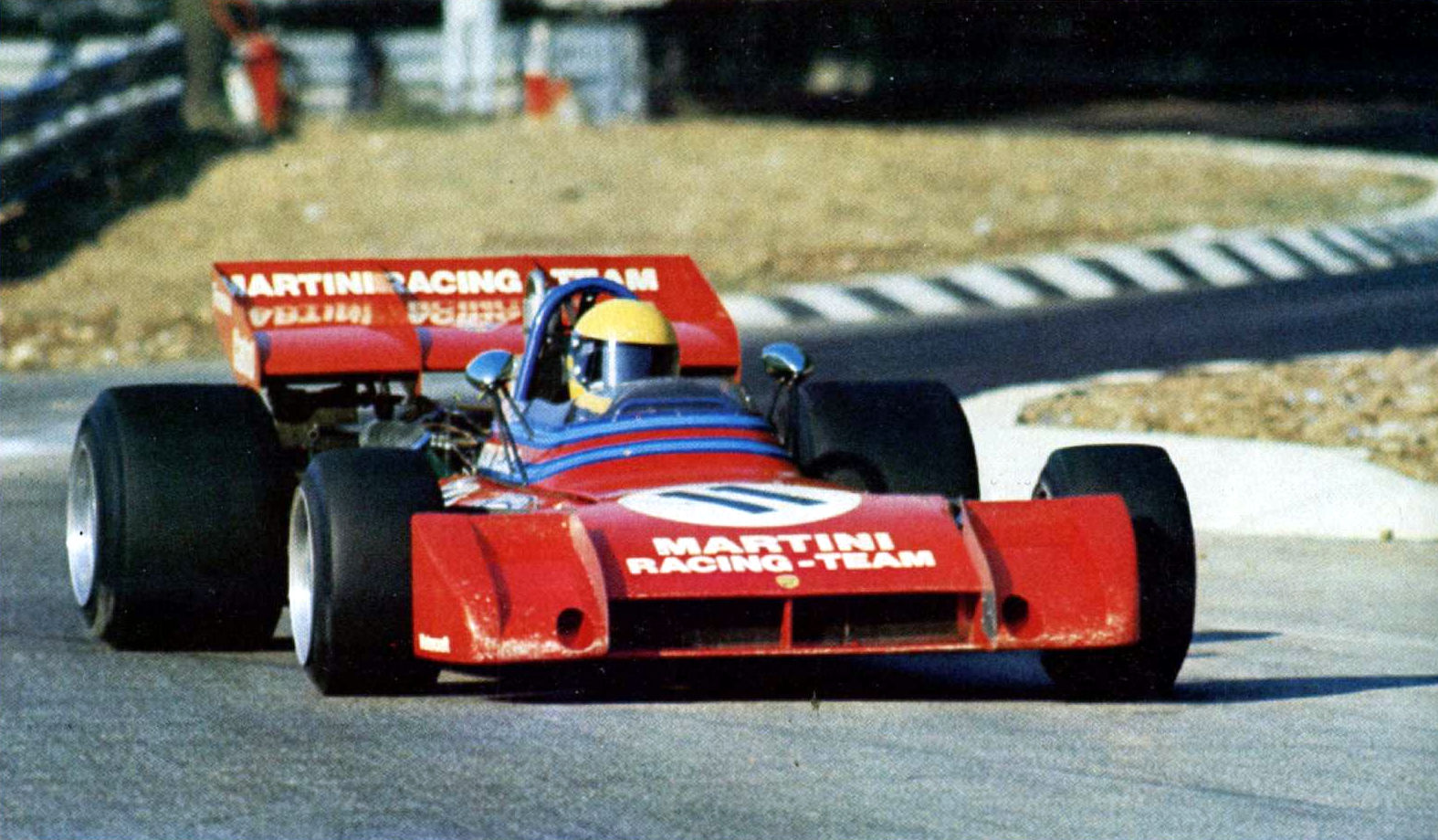
1972 Italian GP - Nanni Galli (Martini Tecno)

Tecno's Formula One car made its first competitive appearance at the 1972 Belgian Grand Prix in the hands of Nanni Galli. The team chose to adopt the colour red for the chassis, partly to honour the long-standing tradition of Italian racing teams competing with that tonality, and partly to better accommodate their title sponsor. The engine, designed by Luciano Pederzani, Renato Armaroli and Giuseppe Bocchi, was a flat-twelve engine very similar to the contemporary Ferrari unit, although apparently considerably less powerful. Galli managed to finish third in the non-championship 1972 Italian Republic Grand Prix in Vallelunga, but he wouldn't score points for the rest of the season. For the Italian Grand Prix Tecno fielded a second car driven by Derek Bell. Although Galli outqualified Bell, team manager David Yorke elected to retain Bell for the final two races in North America, terminating Galli's involvement with the company.

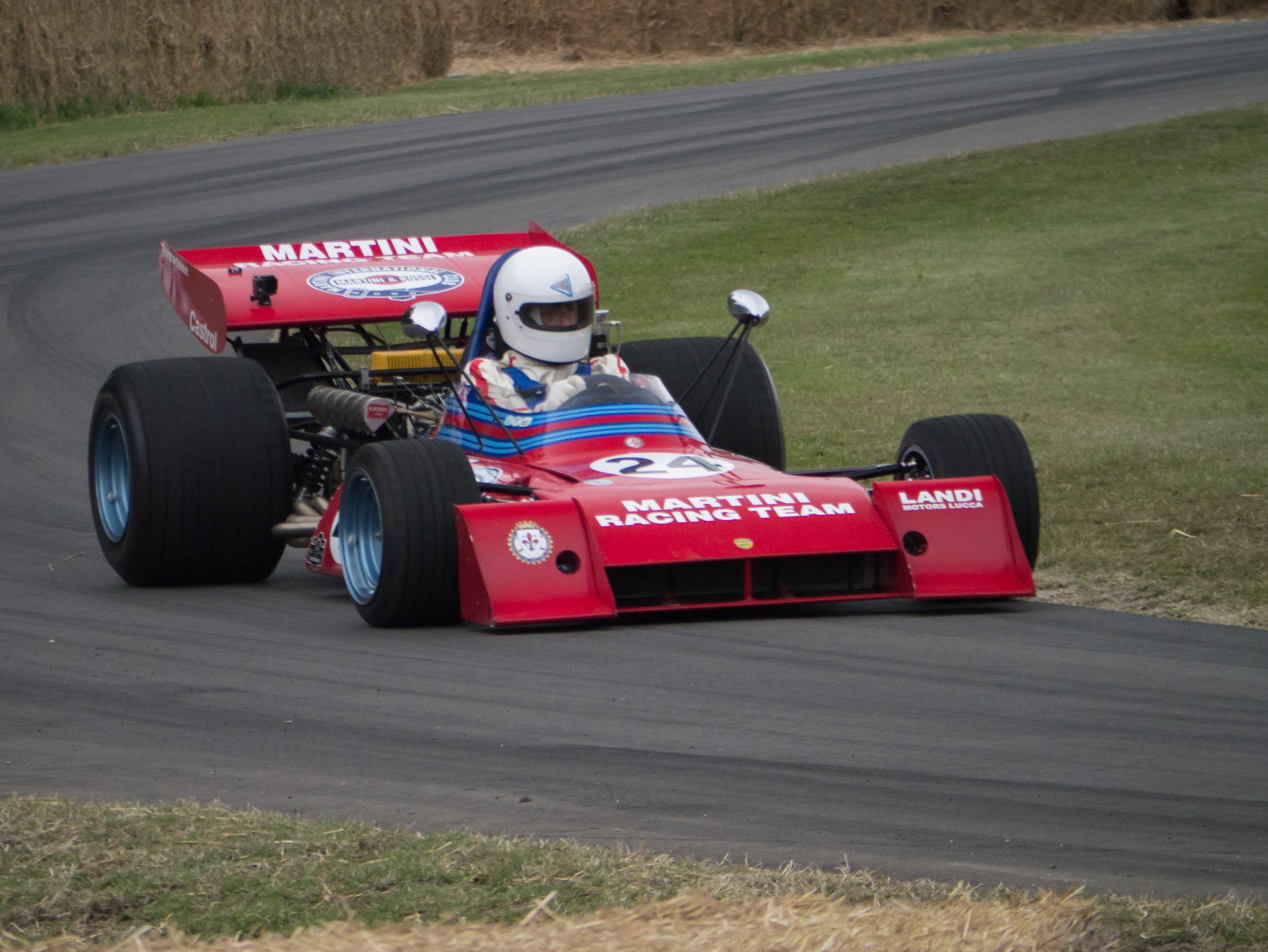
1972 Tecno PA123

In 1973, serious disagreements between the Pederzani brothers and Rossi and Yorke over the sporting and technical direction of the team generated a fracture that the two parties were never able to fully recompose. The Pederzanis were interested in hiring Clay Regazzoni, whereas Rossi and Yorke wanted the expert Chris Amon, who had been unable to agree terms with March Engineering for the season. Yorke and Rossi commissioned a new chassis from designer Gordon Fowell, while the Pederzanis hired Alan McCall to design a new car. McCall left before the project was fully developed, and the car was completed by Ron Tauranac, who was freelancing after selling Brabham at the end of 1972.

After missing the early-season races due to the internal turmoil, Tecno finally debuted with the McCall/Tauranac car (the PA123) at the Belgian Grand Prix, where Amon finished sixth, achieving the team's first and only point. The car continued to show good promise in its second outing at the drivers circuit of Monaco, where Amon qualified 12th, in front of Jacky Ickx's Ferrari, and ran well in the upper midfield for 25 laps.

At the British Grand Prix, Tecno found itself in the peculiar position of having two different cars available, with both the Fowell "Goral" car (the E371) and the McCall/Tauranac car in the garage. In the PA123, Amon qualified last. He managed to escape the multiple collision triggered by Jody Scheckter during the opening stages of the race that took out nine cars but had to retire with a broken fuel pump after six laps. Amon moved up to qualify 23rd for the Dutch Grand Prix but he had to retire again after 22 laps with the same technical problem.

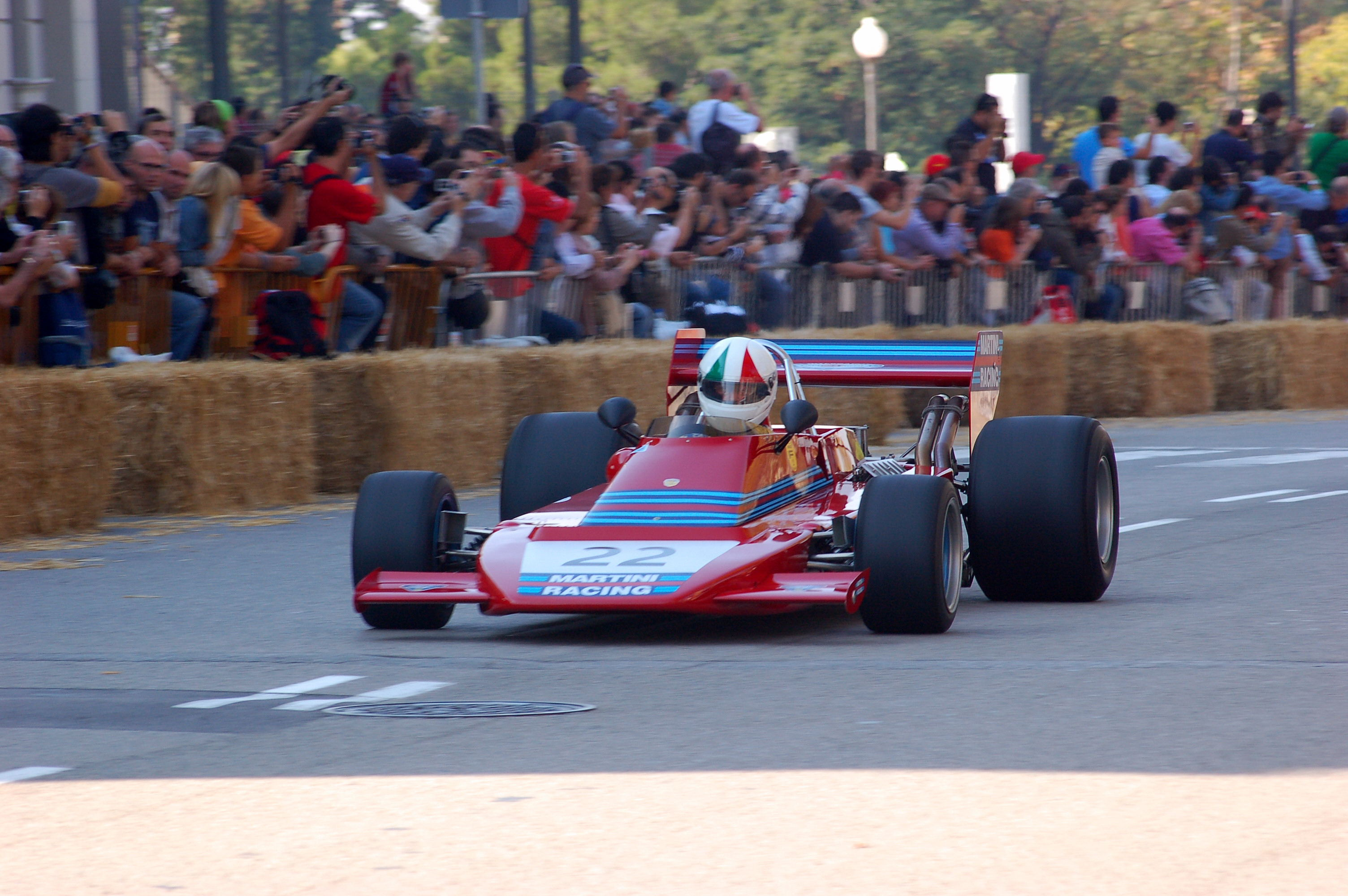
1973 Tecno E371

Having two different, underfunded and underdeveloped cars competing with scarce resources made the team's struggle untenable, and by the Austrian Grand Prix, the ongoing dispute between the Pederzanis and Yorke and Rossi resulted in a discontented Amon leaving the team to drive for Tyrrell. Despite having commissioned an eight-cylinder engine for the following year, the Pederzanis decided to shut down the Formula One program. Rossi took the Martini & Rossi sponsorship to Brabham in 1974, and eventually established the racing brand Martini Racing; Luciano and Gianfranco Pederzani retired from the sport, citing the toxic atmosphere that pervaded the team in 1973 as the main cause of their disillusionment.

== Major titles ==
- 9 European Karting titles
- 5 Karting World Championship titles
- 4 Italian Formula Three titles
- 2 Swedish Formula Three titles with Ronnie Peterson
- 2 Championnat de France de la Montagne titles
- 1 European Formula Two with Clay Regazzoni

== Complete Formula One results ==
(key)

Year	Chassis	Engine(s)	Tyres	Drivers	1	2	3	4	5	6	7	8	9	10	11	12	13	14	15	Points	WCC
1972	Tecno PA123	Tecno Series-P; F12	**F**		ARG	RSA	ESP	MON	BEL	FRA	GBR	GER	AUT	ITA	CAN	USA				**0**	**NC**
1972	Tecno PA123	Tecno Series-P; F12	**F**	(United Kingdom) Derek Bell						DNS		Ret		DNQ	DNS	Ret				**0**	**NC**
1972	Tecno PA123	Tecno Series-P; F12	**F**	(Italy) Nanni Galli					Ret		Ret		NC	Ret						**0**	**NC**
1973	Tecno PA123B; Tecno E731	Tecno Series-P; F12	**F**		ARG	BRA	RSA	ESP	BEL	MON	SWE	FRA	GBR	NED	GER	AUT	ITA	CAN	USA	**1**	**11th**
1973	Tecno PA123B; Tecno E731	Tecno Series-P; F12	**F**	(New Zealand) Chris Amon					6	Ret			Ret	Ret		DNS				**1**	**11th**

=== Non-Championship results ===
(key) (Races in bold indicate pole position; races in italics indicate fastest lap.)

Year	Entrant	Chassis	Engine	Tyres	Driver	1
1972	Martini Racing Team	Tecno PA123	Tecno Series P F12	F	(Italy) Nanni Galli	REP; 3
