= Eagle Mk1 =

Eagle Mk1 (T1G)
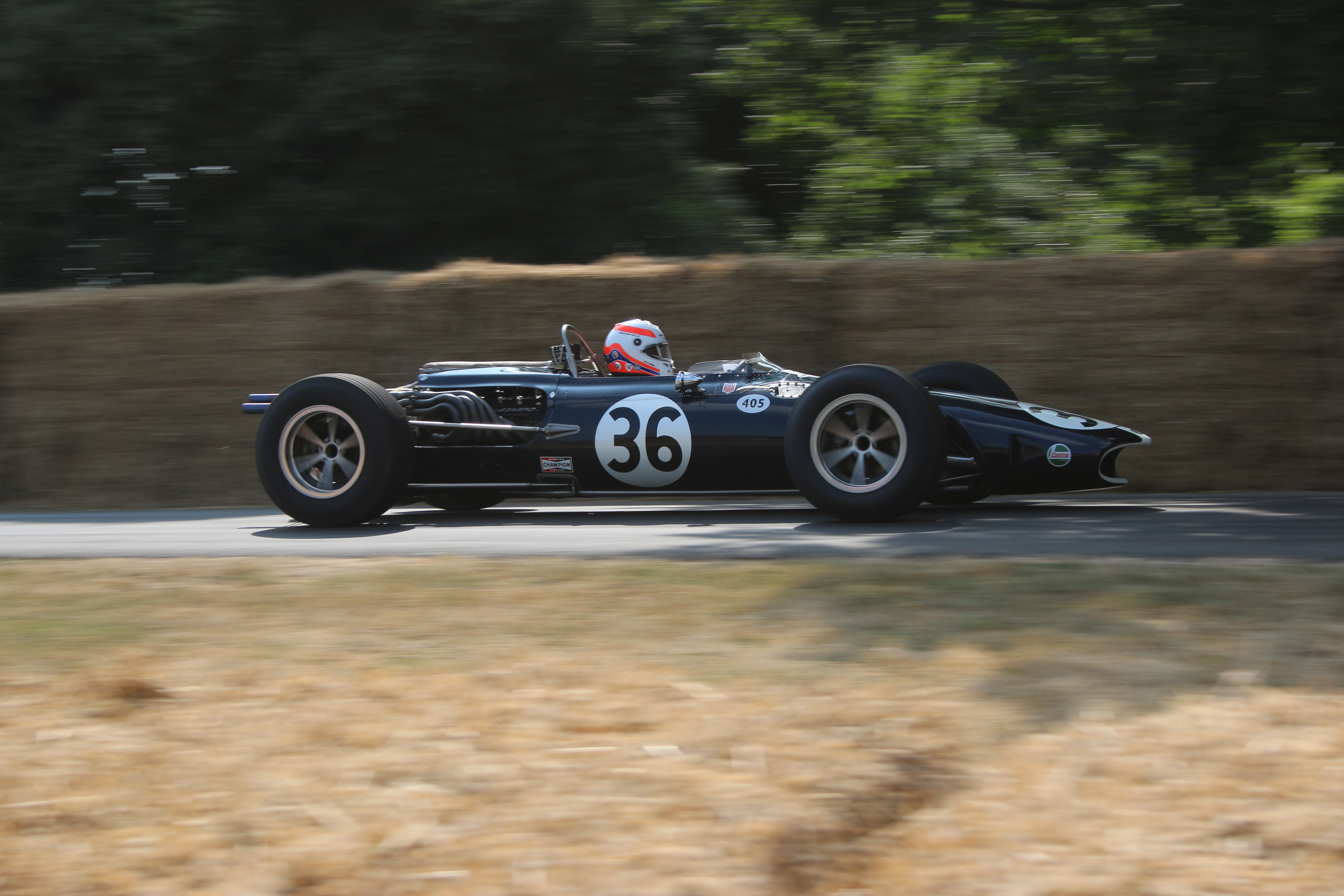
- The Eagle Mk1 at the 2018 Goodwood Festival of Speed
- Category: Formula One
- Constructor: All American Racers
- Designer: Len Terry

Technical specifications
- Chassis: Aluminium/Titanium-magnesium monocoque
- Suspension (front): Lower wishbone with single top links.
- Suspension (rear): As front.
- Axle track: 60 in (1,524 mm)
- Wheelbase: 96.4 in (2,449 mm)
- Engine: Gurney-Weslake Type 58 2,997 cc (182.9 cu in) V12 naturally aspirated, mid-engined, longitudinally mounted
- Transmission: Hewland DG300 5-speed manual
- Fuel: Shell
- Tyres: Goodyear

Competition history
- Notable entrants: Anglo American Racers
- Notable drivers: (United States) Dan Gurney (United States) Phil Hill (New Zealand) Bruce McLaren (United States) Dan Gurney (United States) Bob Bondurant (Italy) Ludovico Scarfiotti (United States) Richie Ginther (Canada) Al Pease
- Debut: 1966 Belgian Grand Prix, Circuit de Spa-Francorchamps.
- First win: 1967 Belgian Grand Prix
- Last win: 1967 Belgian Grand Prix
- Last event: 1969 Canadian Grand Prix
Races	Wins	Poles	F/Laps
26	1	0	2
- Unless otherwise stated, all data refer to Formula One World Championship Grands Prix only.

The Eagle Mk1, commonly referred to as the Eagle T1G, was a Formula One racing car, designed by Len Terry for Dan Gurney's Anglo American Racers team. The Eagle, introduced for the start of the 1966 Formula One season, is often regarded as being one of the most beautiful Grand Prix cars ever raced at the top levels of international motorsport. Initially appearing with a 2.7L Coventry Climax inline 4-cylinder engine, the car was designed around a 3.0L Gurney-Weslake V12 which was introduced after its first four races. In the hands of team boss Gurney, the Eagle-Weslake won the 1967 Belgian Grand Prix, making Dan Gurney only the second driver at the time, and one of only three to date (along with Jack Brabham and Bruce McLaren), to win a Formula One Grand Prix in a car of their own construction.

Excluding the Indianapolis 500, that win in Belgium still stands as the only win for a USA-built car as well as one of only two wins of an American-licensed constructor in Formula One. It was also the first win for an American constructor in a Grand Prix race since the Jimmy Murphy's triumph with Duesenberg at the 1921 French Grand Prix.

As of 2024, the Eagle Mk1 remains the last-ever Formula One car to utilize the carburetor fuel feed engine technology on the Climax inline-four engine.

== Design ==
A highly successful motor racing driver in many disciplines, Dan Gurney had been driving in Formula One since the late 1950s. While driving for the Brabham works team, he joined with a group of prominent motor racing figures and financial backers in the United States, including Carroll Shelby, to found All American Racers. This effort was largely backed by the Goodyear Tire & Rubber Company, in an effort to challenge Firestone's longtime dominance of American open-wheel racing. Inspired by the performance of Jack Brabham and Bruce McLaren's own teams, AAR decided to enter Grand Prix racing. Then as now, the main engineering hub for Formula One manufacturers was in the United Kingdom, so AAR set up a subsidiary team known as Anglo American Racers which, while registered in the US, was based in Rye, East Sussex, UK and named in deference to the cars' British Weslake engines. The cars were built in Santa Ana, California, USA by the All American Racers team.

To achieve AAR's dual aims of winning in both Formula One and Champ Car formulae, AAR hired ex-Lotus designer Len Terry to work for the American outfit. His brief was to create a chassis that could be used both for the twisting road course circuits of the F1 series, as well as the broad ovals of the North American series. Terry was ideally placed to be able to fulfill such a brief, having just completed the 1965 Indianapolis 500-winning Lotus 38 for Colin Chapman's team.

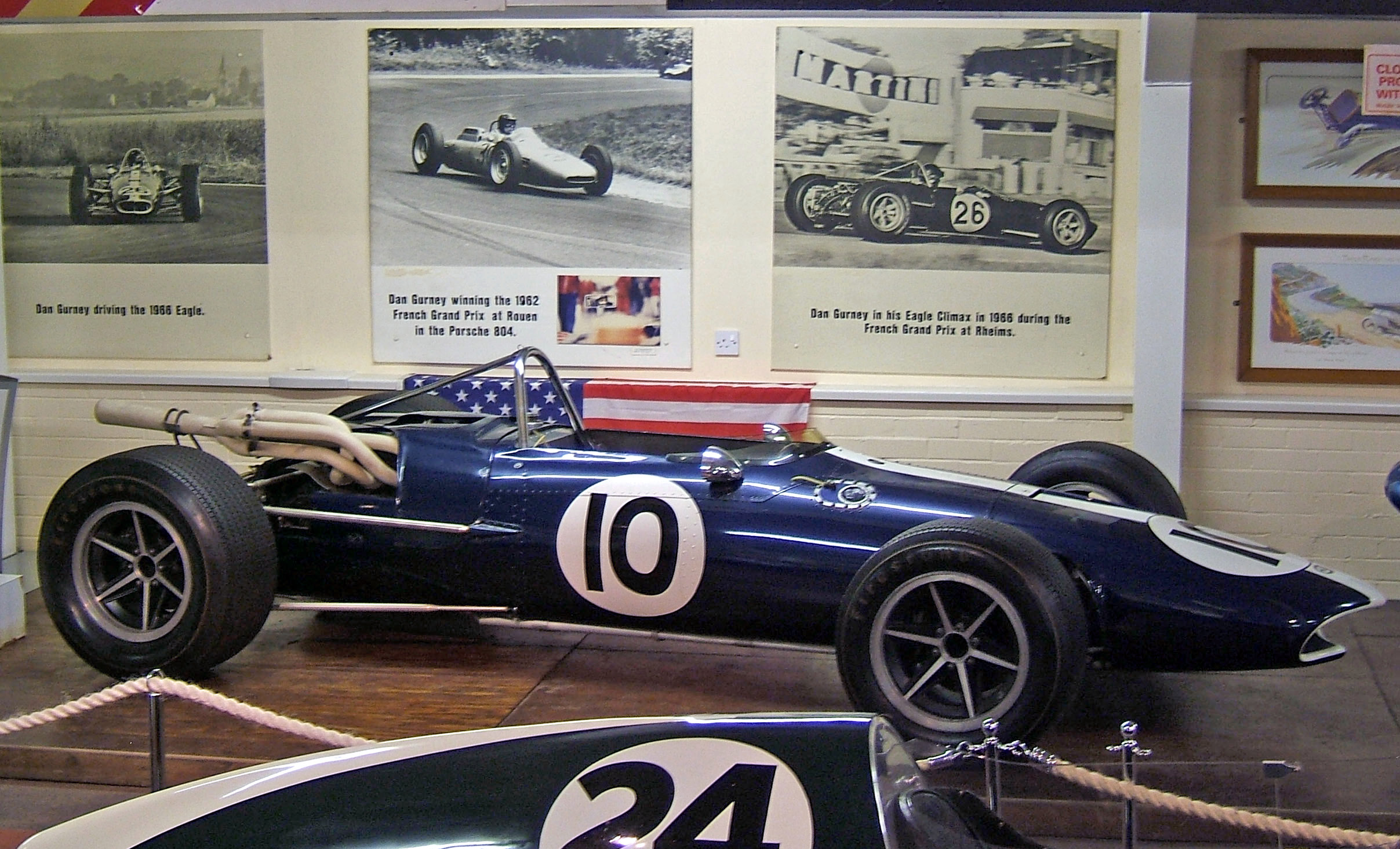
The early, Coventry Climax-powered, version of the T1G used in 1966 and early 1967 prior to the introduction of the V12. The "beaked" radiator intake is clearly seen. The car wears the Imperial blue paint, the national racing colour of the United States.

The design of the Mk1, and its Indy sister design the Mk2, closely followed the 38, with a riveted aluminium monocoque central section, carrying an unstressed engine mounted behind the driver. The lines of the chassis were remarkably clean and elegant, and the car sported a distinctively beaked radiator opening at the front. Suspension components were mounted directly on to this monocoque, and consisted of a comparatively conservative lower wishbone and single top link for each wheel which also served as a rocker for the inboard-mounted spring/damper package. The Mk1 was designed around the forthcoming Aubrey Woods-designed Weslake V12 engine while the Mk2, essentially the same chassis design, was designed to accept the quad-cam Ford V8 that had powered the previous year's Indy 500 winner (Jim Clark, in the Terry-designed Lotus 38).

While driving for the British Racing Motors (BRM) Formula One team in 1960, Gurney became acquainted with BRM engineer Aubrey Woods, who then moved to Weslake Engineering. Through Woods, Gurney became aware of a Weslake engine research project funded by Shell Oil. This two-cylinder, 500-cc test engine produced impressive horsepower, and Gurney extrapolated the test engine's output to a 3-liter, V12 Grand Prix engine, potentially putting out up to 450 horsepower, and he commissioned Weslake to build the engine.

While five Mk2 chassis, complete with four-cam Ford V8s, qualified for the 1966 Indianapolis 500, the Weslake V12 was not available for the start of the Formula One season. The first Mk1s took to the track with old 2.7-liter Coventry Climax FPF inline-4 engines in their place. Once the Weslake was ready, however, the car proved to be highly competitive, if unreliable. The high-revving V12 had been constructed using surplus machine tools dating from World War I, so tolerances and parts interchangeability were poor. Nevertheless, when running the Weslake was an immediately arresting engine, with a distinctive V12-scream, and developed 360bhp even in its earliest development phase. By the end of the 1967 season this figure was over 400 bhp, easily competing with the Ferrari and Honda V12s, and the newly introduced Cosworth DFV V8. One mechanical flaw that limited the engine's power output involved a design mistake in the oil scavenging system. This problem—discovered too late in the development process to correct—caused oil to pool in the engine's sump, slightly reducing power. Gurney described the effect as "taking the edge" off the engine after three or four laps of a race. That year Beatrice Shilling was brought in to help solve the oil problem.

Three Mk1 chassis were produced with the original aluminium construction, but the fourth incorporated advanced and exotic metal alloys. This included extensive use of titanium for many of the componentry, and a high percentage of magnesium sheet in the monocoque panelwork. Owing to its novel construction materials this car, chassis number 104, was referred to as the Ti-Mag Car. Gurney was well aware of the risks involved in driving a car made from such flammable materials. After witnessing Jo Schlesser's death in a magnesium-fuelled fireball during the 1968 French Grand Prix, Gurney compared racing in 104 to "driving a Ronson cigarette lighter".

== Race history ==
The Eagle Mk1 made its race debut at the 1966 Belgian Grand Prix, with a single car entered for Dan Gurney. The Eagle made an instant visual impact, with its gracefully crafted chassis clothed in dark Imperial blue paint, with a white-lipped radiator opening and a single white stripe running the length of the car's dorsal surface; an elegant interpretation of the national racing colour of the United States. Unfortunately for the team the car, despite its good looks, failed to finish. For the introduction of the new V12 engine at the 1966 Italian Grand Prix, Gurney took the wheel of the new car, and was joined by compatriot Phil Hill in the older Eagle-Climax. Once again it was an inauspicious start, with Hill failing to qualify, and Gurney retiring during the race. Gurney did score points during the season, at both the French and Mexican events, but on both occasions this was with the Climax-powered car.

For the 1967 Formula One season the Climax-engined chassis 101 was sold to Canadian driver Al Pease, and all AAR chassis ran as Eagle-Weslake machines. The season proved to be intensely frustrating for all concerned. Although Gurney and sometime teammate Bruce McLaren managed to qualify the Eagle-Weslake cars in the front two rows of the grid on no fewer than eleven occasions from the season's eleven Grands Prix, only two cars finished a race. That both of these finishes were in podium positions highlights the raw speed of the Eagle Mk1. AAR's first major race win came in the 1967 Race of Champions at Brands Hatch, with Gurney taking the aluminium-chassis 102 to victory in this prestigious non-Championship season opener. 104 was introduced at Zandvoort, the Netherlands, early in 1967; the lightest and fastest of the Eagle Mk1 vehicles, it was with this car that Gurney scored the team's only Championship victory: the 1967 Belgian Grand Prix.

By 1968, and despite increasing success in their native series, Anglo American Racers were starting to run short of funds. Development of the Eagle Mk1 was halted as the team ploughed what little funding it had into the design of its successor, the projected Mk6. Nevertheless, Gurney persisted with the older car for the first half of the 1968 season, but was only rewarded with a handful of retirements and one single, ninth-placed finish. With the obviously unreliable car also, thanks to its intricate V12 engine, being one of the more expensive cars on the grid to maintain, AAR bought a McLaren M7A. Ironically it was with the McLaren, built by his previous year's AAR teammate, that Gurney scored the team's only points of the season. At the end of the season AAR closed the doors on their foray into Grand Prix racing, to concentrate their efforts on USAC racing.

The last appearance of an Eagle Mk1 in a Formula One race was when Pease privately entered 101 for the 1969 Canadian Grand Prix. Pease and the Eagle-Climax car suffered the ignominy of being the only car in the history of Formula 1 to be disqualified at a World Championship race for being too slow. The basic Mk1/Mk2 chassis design continued to be used in American National Championship races into the early 1970s. In common with most cars of the time, experimental wings and other aerodynamic aids - including the Gurney flap - were added to Terry's lithe chassis lines over the years, reducing the cars' visual impact and obscuring car's most noteworthy single design feature, the vestigial eagle's-beak nose.

=== Formula One World Championship results ===
(key) (results in italics indicate fastest lap)

Year	Entrant	Engine/s	Tyres	Driver	1	2	3	4	5	6	7	8	9	10	11	12	Points	WCC
1966	Anglo American Racers	Climax L4; Weslake V12	G		MON	BEL	FRA	GBR	NED	GER	ITA	USA	MEX				4^{†} 0	7th^{†} 13th
1966	Anglo American Racers	Climax L4; Weslake V12	G	Dan Gurney		Ret^{†}	5^{†}	Ret^{†}	Ret^{†}	7^{†}	Ret	Ret	5^{†}				4^{†} 0	7th^{†} 13th
1966	Anglo American Racers	Climax L4; Weslake V12	G	Phil Hill							DNQ^{†}						4^{†} 0	7th^{†} 13th
1966	Anglo American Racers	Climax L4; Weslake V12	G	Bob Bondurant								DSQ^{†}	Ret				4^{†} 0	7th^{†} 13th
1967	Anglo American Racers	Climax L4; Weslake V12	G		RSA	MON	NED	BEL	FRA	GBR	GER	CAN	ITA	USA	MEX		0^{†} 13	12th^{†} 7th
1967	Anglo American Racers	Climax L4; Weslake V12	G	Dan Gurney	Ret^{†}	Ret	Ret	1	Ret	Ret	Ret	3	Ret	Ret	Ret		0^{†} 13	12th^{†} 7th
1967	Anglo American Racers	Climax L4; Weslake V12	G	Richie Ginther		DNQ											0^{†} 13	12th^{†} 7th
1967	Anglo American Racers	Climax L4; Weslake V12	G	Bruce McLaren					Ret	Ret	Ret						0^{†} 13	12th^{†} 7th
1967	Anglo American Racers	Climax L4; Weslake V12	G	Ludovico Scarfiotti									Ret				0^{†} 13	12th^{†} 7th
1967	Castrol Oils Ltd.	Climax L4	G	Al Pease								NC^{†}					0^{†} 13	12th^{†} 7th
1968	Anglo American Racers	Weslake V12	G		RSA	ESP	MON	BEL	NED	FRA	GBR	GER	ITA	CAN	USA	MEX	0	NC
1968	Anglo American Racers	Weslake V12	G	Dan Gurney	Ret		Ret				Ret	9	Ret				0	NC
1968	Castrol Oils Ltd.	Climax L4	G	Al Pease										DNS			0	NC
1969	John Maryon	Climax L4	F		RSA	ESP	MON	NED	FRA	GBR	GER	ITA	CAN	USA	MEX		0^{†}	NC^{†}
1969	John Maryon	Climax L4	F	Al Pease									DSQ^{†}				0^{†}	NC^{†}

^{†} Climax-engined results. All other results are for Weslake-engined cars.

== Name confusion ==
Although commonly referred to as the T1G (and chassis 101 as the T1F), Dan Gurney has stated that this was never the car's official designation. Instead, the car was simply the Eagle Mark 1. Hence, the four chassis produced were numbered 101, 102, 103 and 104 (the Ti-Mag car). The Indianapolis sister cars were the Mk2, with subsequent Indy designs also taking model numbers 3 and 4. The Mk5 was a Formula A car adapted from the Mk 4 chassis, while Mk6 was the designation given to the still-born Formula One successor to the Mk1. With AAR's withdrawal from Grand Prix racing at the end of 1968, the team switched to a year-based chassis numeration scheme, with Indy chassis from 1971 onward taking numbers (e.g. 71xx) according to their year of design.
