= Matra MS84 =

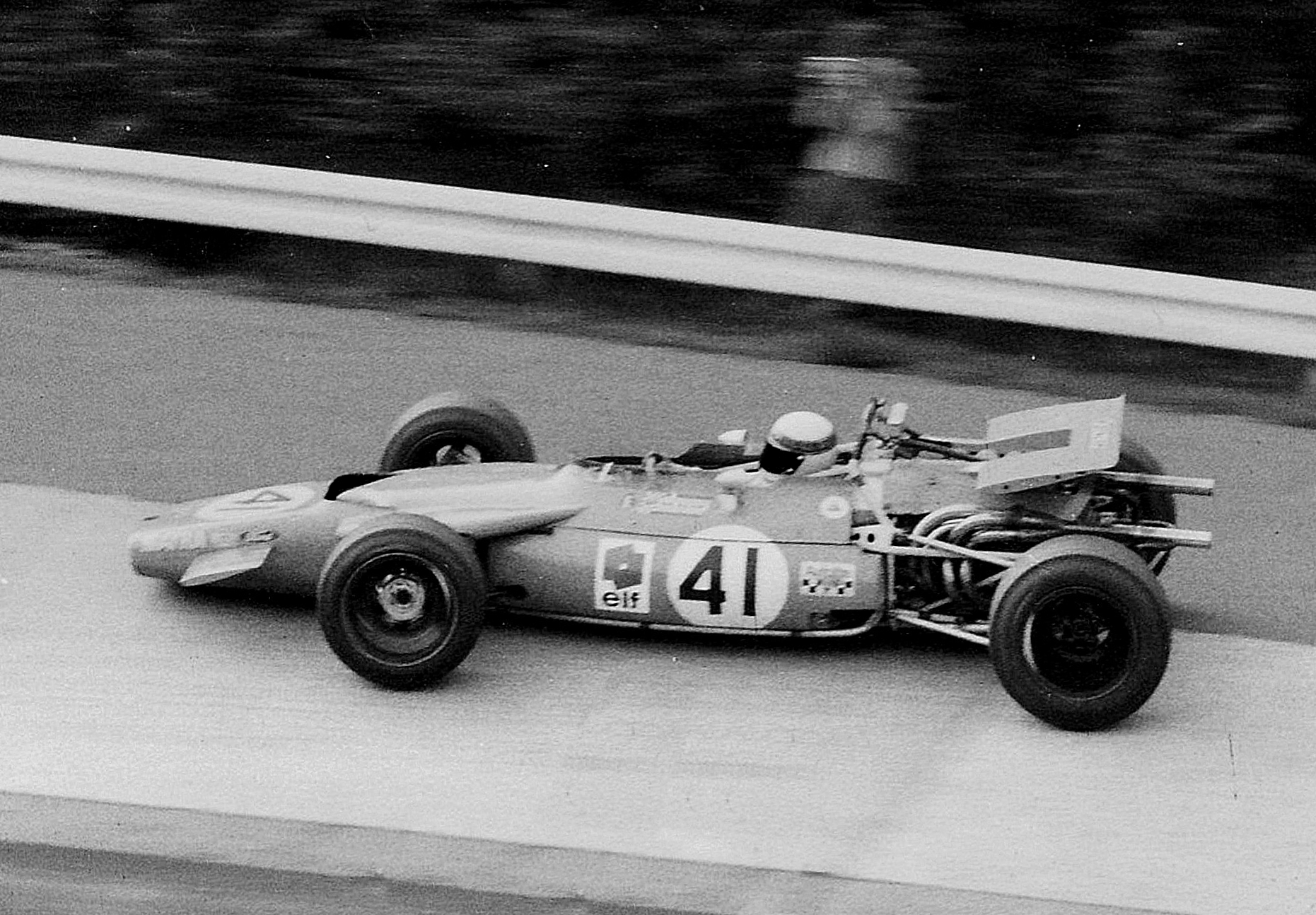
- Jackie Stewart pictured with the MS84 at the Nürburgring
- Category: Formula One
- Constructor: Matra
- Designer: Bernard Boyer
- Predecessor: Matra MS80
- Successor: Matra MS120

Technical specifications
- Chassis: Steel spaceframe
- Engine: Ford Cosworth DFV 2,993 cc (182.6 cu in) V8 NA mid-engined
- Transmission: Ferguson / Hewland 5 speed
- Fuel: Elf
- Tyres: Dunlop

Competition history
- Notable entrants: Matra International
- Notable drivers: (France) Johnny Servoz-Gavin (France) Jean-Pierre Beltoise
- Debut: 1969 British Grand Prix
Races	Wins	Poles	F/Laps
4	0	0	0
- Constructors' Championships: 0
- Drivers' Championships: 0
- Unless otherwise stated, all data refer to Formula One World Championship Grands Prix only.

The Matra MS84 was the fifth Formula One car produced by Matra (following the MS9, MS10, MS11 and MS80), which competed in the 1969 Formula One season.

== Development ==
The car was built at Matra's Formula One base at Vélizy-Villacoublay in the southwestern suburbs of Paris, designed under the direction of Bernard Boyer and built by Jean Bee (a.k.a. "Bunny") under the direction of Legan. It was run by the Matra International team of Ken Tyrrell with full technical support from Matra and the financial backing of Elf.

Although it has a family resemblance with the MS80 with which Matra won the 1969 Constructors' Championship, it is a completely different car with a steel tube chassis instead of an aluminium monocoque. At the back the engine is mounted back-to-front with the gearbox and transfer case directly behind the driver. The four wheel drive system was designed by Derek Gardner of Harry Ferguson Research. The Ferguson transmission and other necessary additions left the car much heavier than the two-wheel drive MS80s (635 kg with no fuel).

== Racing history ==
Like the Lotus 63, the MS84 made its first appearance at the Dutch Grand Prix, where Jackie Stewart tried the car out but opted to use his MS80, as he would for the rest of the season.

The car was still present at all the remaining races as a spare, and at Silverstone Jean-Pierre Beltoise gave the car its first race and came home ninth, six laps behind Stewart's two-wheel drive Matra (but three laps ahead of John Miles's Lotus 63). By the next time the car raced, the front differential had been disconnected and the car effectively ran as an over-weight MS80 with inboard front brakes, memorably giving the lie to Johnny Servoz-Gavin's protestations about the 4WD car being "undriveable" after he finished the Canadian Grand Prix six laps down in sixth place. Servoz-Gavin also drove the car at Watkins Glen, finishing 16 laps down and unclassified, and finally in Mexico, crossing the line "just" two laps down in eighth place. Although there was a project for a 4WD Matra MS 124, the MS84 was never replaced.

== Complete Formula One World Championship results ==
(key)

Year	Entrant	Engines	Tyres	Drivers	1	2	3	4	5	6	7	8	9	10	11	Points	WCC
1969	Matra International	Ford Cosworth DFV; 3.0 V8	D		RSA	ESP	MON	NED	FRA	GBR	GER	ITA	CAN	USA	MEX	66^{1}	1st
1969	Matra International	Ford Cosworth DFV; 3.0 V8	D	Jean-Pierre Beltoise				PO		9						66^{1}	1st
1969	Matra International	Ford Cosworth DFV; 3.0 V8	D	Jackie Stewart				PO	PO		PO					66^{1}	1st
1969	Matra International	Ford Cosworth DFV; 3.0 V8	D	Johnny Servoz-Gavin								DNA	6	NC	8	66^{1}	1st

^1 Includes 9 points scored using a Matra MS10 and 57 points scored using a Matra MS80.
