= 1969 Formula One season =

23rd season of the FIA's Formula One motor racing

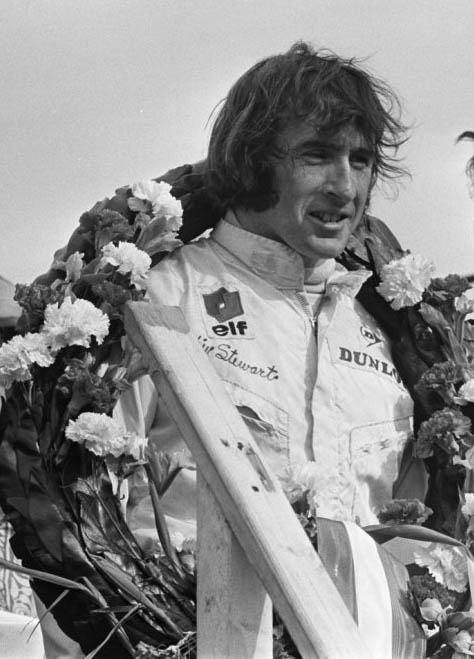
Briton Jackie Stewart won the first of his three Drivers' championships.

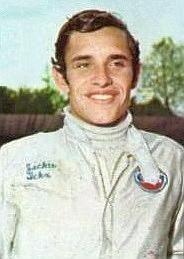
Jacky Ickx finished as runner-up in the World Drivers' Championship.

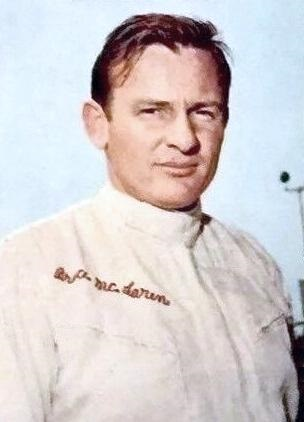
Bruce McLaren finished third in the championship.

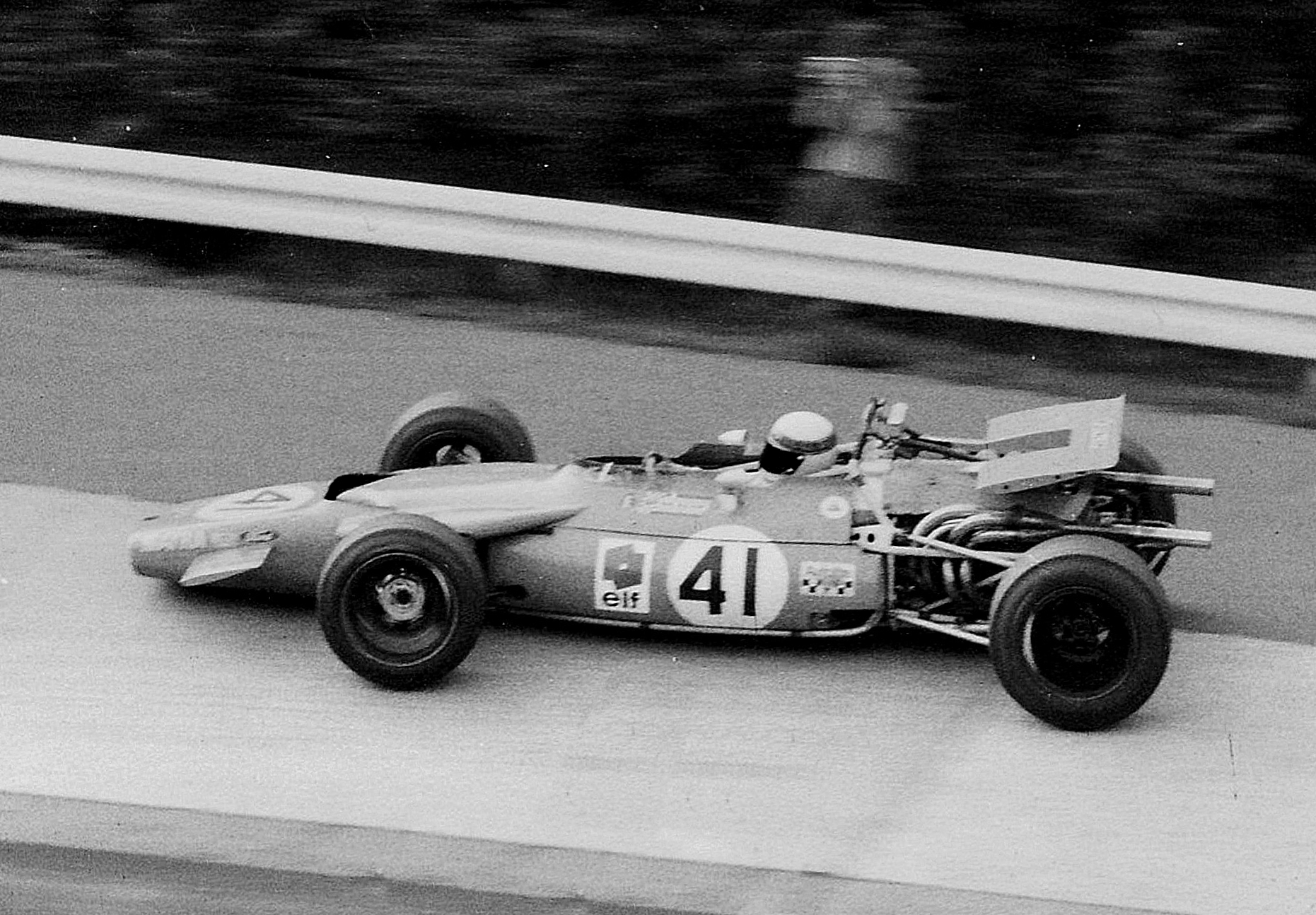
Matra-Ford won the International Cup for F1 Manufacturers with the Matra MS10, MS80 & MS84.

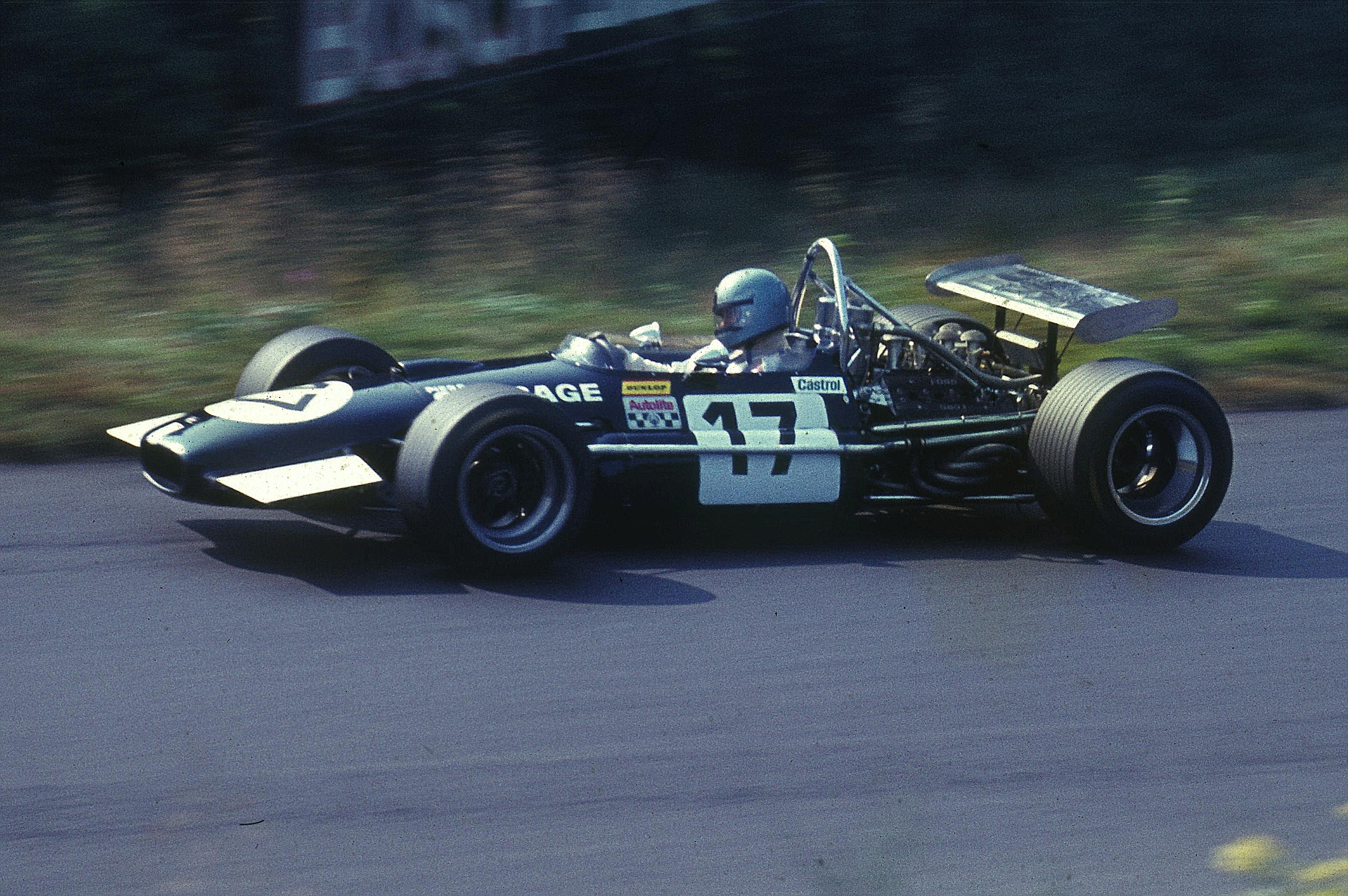
Brabham-Ford finished runner- up with the Brabham BT26A.

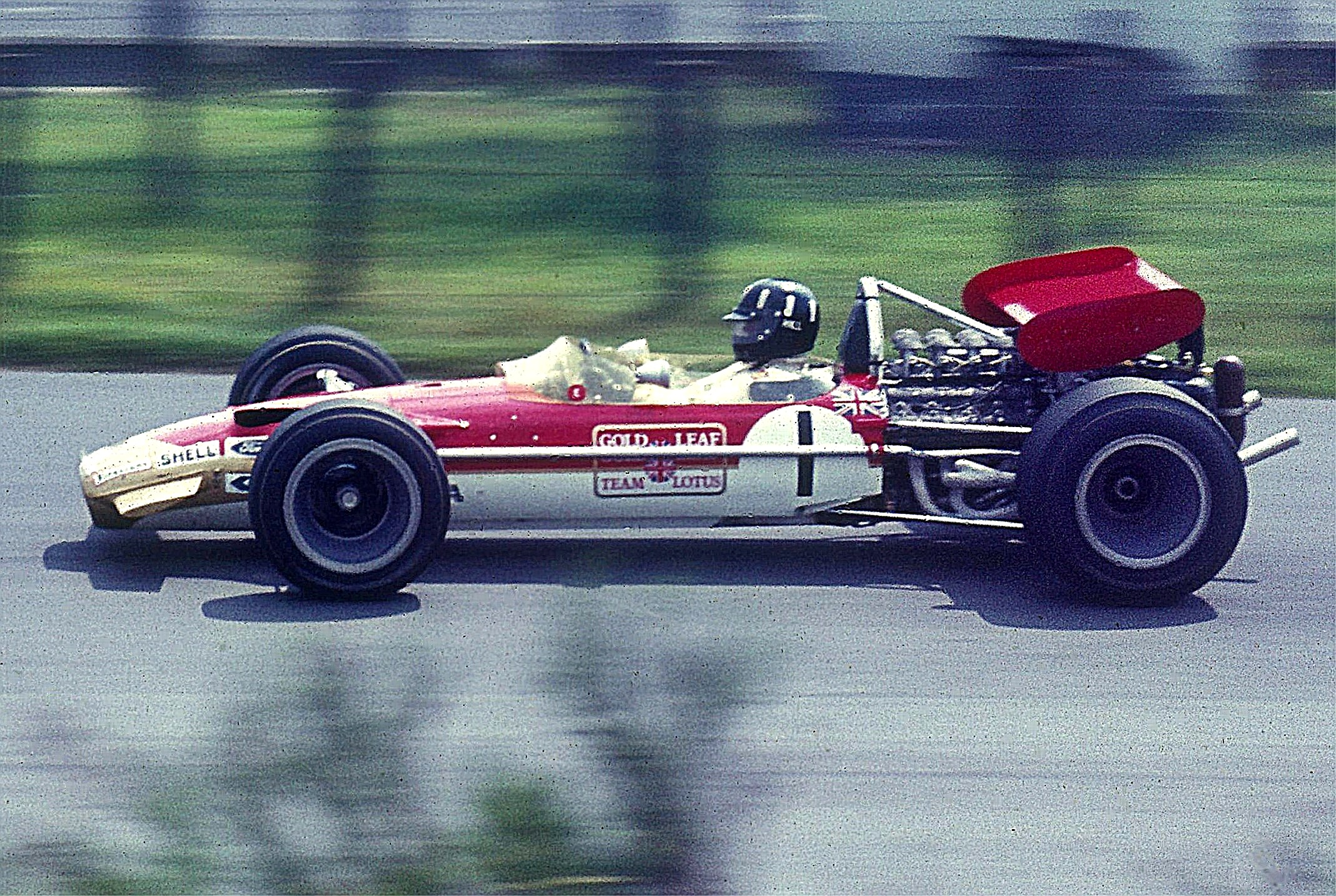
Lotus-Ford finished third with the Lotus 49B & 63.

The 1969 Formula One season was the 23rd season of the FIA's Formula One motor racing. It featured the 20th World Championship of Drivers, the 12th International Cup for F1 Manufacturers and four non-championship races open to Formula One cars. The World Championship was contested over eleven races between 1 March and 19 October 1969.

British driver Jackie Stewart, driving a Matra-Ford Cosworth, won more than half of the races and claimed his first Drivers' Championship. The Matra works team did not compete in this season, but the privateer Matra International team, led by Ken Tyrrell, helped Matra win the Manufacturers' Cup. Both titles were the first titles won by a French constructor, and still remain the only titles won by a car built in France as well as by a car entered by a privateer team.

== Teams and drivers ==
The following teams and drivers competed in the 1969 World Championship.

Entrant	Constructor	Chassis	Engine	Tyre	Driver	Rounds
(United Kingdom) Gold Leaf Team Lotus	Lotus-Ford	49B; 63	Ford Cosworth DFV 3.0 V8	F	(United Kingdom) Graham Hill	1–10
(United Kingdom) Gold Leaf Team Lotus	Lotus-Ford	49B; 63	Ford Cosworth DFV 3.0 V8	F	(Austria) Jochen Rindt	1–2, 4–11
(United Kingdom) Gold Leaf Team Lotus	Lotus-Ford	49B; 63	Ford Cosworth DFV 3.0 V8	F	(United States) Mario Andretti	1, 7, 10
(United Kingdom) Gold Leaf Team Lotus	Lotus-Ford	49B; 63	Ford Cosworth DFV 3.0 V8	F	(United Kingdom) Richard Attwood	3
(United Kingdom) Gold Leaf Team Lotus	Lotus-Ford	49B; 63	Ford Cosworth DFV 3.0 V8	F	(United Kingdom) John Miles	5–6, 8–9, 11
(United Kingdom) Rob Walker/Jack Durlacher Racing Team	Lotus-Ford	49B	Ford Cosworth DFV 3.0 V8	F	(Switzerland) Jo Siffert	All
(United Kingdom) Bruce McLaren Motor Racing	McLaren-Ford	M7A; M7B; M7C; M9A	Ford Cosworth DFV 3.0 V8	G	(New Zealand) Denny Hulme	All
(United Kingdom) Bruce McLaren Motor Racing	McLaren-Ford	M7A; M7B; M7C; M9A	Ford Cosworth DFV 3.0 V8	G	(New Zealand) Bruce McLaren	All
(United Kingdom) Bruce McLaren Motor Racing	McLaren-Ford	M7A; M7B; M7C; M9A	Ford Cosworth DFV 3.0 V8	G	(United Kingdom) Derek Bell	6
(United Kingdom) Matra International	Matra-Ford	MS10; MS80; MS84	Ford Cosworth DFV 3.0 V8	D	(United Kingdom) Jackie Stewart	All
(United Kingdom) Matra International	Matra-Ford	MS10; MS80; MS84	Ford Cosworth DFV 3.0 V8	D	(France) Jean-Pierre Beltoise	All
(United Kingdom) Matra International	Matra-Ford	MS10; MS80; MS84	Ford Cosworth DFV 3.0 V8	D	(France) Johnny Servoz-Gavin	9–11
(United Kingdom) Matra International	Matra-Ford	MS7	Ford Cosworth FVA 1.6 L4	D	(France) Johnny Servoz-Gavin	7
(Italy) Scuderia Ferrari SpA SEFAC (United States) North American Racing Team	Ferrari	312/68; 312/69	Ferrari 255C 3.0 V12	F	(New Zealand) Chris Amon	1–6
(Italy) Scuderia Ferrari SpA SEFAC (United States) North American Racing Team	Ferrari	312/68; 312/69	Ferrari 255C 3.0 V12	F	(Mexico) Pedro Rodríguez	6, 8–11
(Italy) Scuderia Ferrari SpA SEFAC (United States) North American Racing Team	Ferrari	312/68; 312/69	Ferrari 255C 3.0 V12	F	(Italy) Tino Brambilla	8
(United Kingdom) Owen Racing Organisation	BRM	P138; P133; P139	BRM P101 3.0 V12; BRM P142 3.0 V12	D	(United Kingdom) John Surtees	1–4, 6–11
(United Kingdom) Owen Racing Organisation	BRM	P138; P133; P139	BRM P101 3.0 V12; BRM P142 3.0 V12	D	(United Kingdom) Jackie Oliver	1–4, 6–11
(United Kingdom) Owen Racing Organisation	BRM	P138; P133; P139	BRM P101 3.0 V12; BRM P142 3.0 V12	D	(Canada) Bill Brack	9
(United Kingdom) Owen Racing Organisation	BRM	P138; P133; P139	BRM P101 3.0 V12; BRM P142 3.0 V12	D	(Canada) George Eaton	10–11
(United Kingdom) Reg Parnell Racing	BRM	P126	BRM P101 3.0 V12	G	(Mexico) Pedro Rodríguez	1–3
(United Kingdom) Motor Racing Developments Ltd	Brabham-Ford	BT26A	Ford Cosworth DFV 3.0 V8	G	(Australia) Jack Brabham	1–4, 8–11
(United Kingdom) Motor Racing Developments Ltd	Brabham-Ford	BT26A	Ford Cosworth DFV 3.0 V8	G	(Belgium) Jacky Ickx	All
(Rhodesia) Team Gunston	Lotus-Ford	49	Ford Cosworth DFV 3.0 V8	D	(Rhodesia) John Love	1
(Rhodesia) Team Gunston	Brabham-Repco	BT24	Repco 740 3.0 V8	F	(Rhodesia) Sam Tingle	1
(South Africa) Team Lawson	McLaren-Ford	M7A	Ford Cosworth DFV 3.0 V8	D	(South Africa) Basil van Rooyen	1
(South Africa) Jack Holme	Brabham-Repco	BT20	Repco 620 3.0 V8	G	(South Africa) Peter de Klerk	1
(United Kingdom) Frank Williams Racing Cars	Brabham-Ford	BT26A	Ford Cosworth DFV 3.0 V8	D	(United Kingdom) Piers Courage	2–11
(United Kingdom) Frank Williams Racing Cars	Brabham-Ford	BT30	Ford Cosworth FVA 1.6 L4	D	(United Kingdom) Richard Attwood	7
(United Kingdom) Antique Automobiles	Cooper-Maserati	T86	Maserati 10/F1 3.0 V12	G	(United Kingdom) Vic Elford	3
(United Kingdom) Antique Automobiles	McLaren-Ford	M7B	Ford Cosworth DFV 3.0 V8	G	(United Kingdom) Vic Elford	4–7
(Switzerland) Silvio Moser Racing Team	Brabham-Ford	BT24A	Ford Cosworth DFV 3.0 V8	G	(Switzerland) Silvio Moser	3–5, 8–11
(Switzerland) Ecurie Bonnier	Lotus-Ford	63; 49B	Ford Cosworth DFV 3.0 V8	F	(Sweden) Jo Bonnier	6–7
(West Germany) Ahrens Racing Team	Brabham-Ford	BT30	Ford Cosworth FVA 1.6 L4	D	(West Germany) Kurt Ahrens Jr.	7
(United Kingdom) Roy Winkelmann Racing	Lotus-Ford	59B	Ford Cosworth FVA 1.6 L4	F	(West Germany) Hans Herrmann	7
(United Kingdom) Roy Winkelmann Racing	Lotus-Ford	59B	Ford Cosworth FVA 1.6 L4	F	(West Germany) Rolf Stommelen	7
(West Germany) Bayerische Motoren Werke AG	BMW	269	BMW M12/1 1.6 L4	D	(West Germany) Hubert Hahne	7
(West Germany) Bayerische Motoren Werke AG	BMW	269	BMW M12/1 1.6 L4	D	(West Germany) Gerhard Mitter	7
(West Germany) Bayerische Motoren Werke AG	BMW	269	BMW M12/1 1.6 L4	D	(Austria) Dieter Quester	7
(France) Matra Sports	Matra-Ford	MS7	Ford Cosworth FVA 1.6 L4	D	(France) Henri Pescarolo	7
(Italy) Tecno Racing Team	Tecno-Ford	TF69	Ford Cosworth FVA 1.6 L4	A	(France) François Cevert	7
(Switzerland) Squadra Tartaruga	Brabham-Ford	BT23C	Ford Cosworth FVA 1.6 L4	F	(Switzerland) Xavier Perrot	7
(United Kingdom) Felday Engineering Ltd	Brabham-Ford	BT30	Ford Cosworth FVA 1.6 L4	F	(United Kingdom) Peter Westbury	7
(United States) Pete Lovely Volkswagen Inc.	Lotus-Ford	49B	Ford Cosworth DFV 3.0 V8	F	(United States) Pete Lovely	9–11
(Canada) Paul Seitz	Brabham-Climax	BT23B	Climax FPF 2.8 L4	D	(Canada) John Cordts	9
(Canada) John Maryon	Eagle-Climax	T1F	Climax FPF 2.8 L4	F	(Canada) Al Pease	9

- Pink background denotes F2 entrants to the German Grand Prix.

=== Team and driver changes ===
- Matra did not operate a works team this year, instead focusing on their collaboration with Ken Tyrrell. The Tyrrell team (entered under Matra International) kept Jackie Stewart but replaced Johnny Servoz-Gavin with works driver Jean-Pierre Beltoise.
- Brabham switched from Repco-Brabham RB860 to Ford-Cosworth DFVs, when the Australian company withdrew their support.
- Lotus signed Austrian driver Jochen Rindt instead of Jackie Oliver. The Brit found a new home at BRM. There, John Surtees completed a new driver duo. He had driven for Honda, but the manufacturer had withdrawn from the sport and thus for the first time since 1963 season not to feature Honda brand entirely in the sport.
- The same was true for Cooper and Eagle. Both manufacturers were seen back just once in the 1969 season, being driven by privateer teams.
- Jacky Ickx moved to Brabham to take Rindt's place and his old team, Scuderia Ferrari, reduced their operations to one car for Chris Amon.
- This season marked the debut of legendary team owner Frank Williams. He bought a Brabham BT26A and promoted his Formula Two driver Piers Courage.

==== Mid-season changes ====
Going into the second half of the season, Chris Amon left Ferrari. The Italian team signed Mexican driver Pedro Rodríguez from BRM.

== Calendar ==
Round	Grand Prix	Circuit	Date
1	South African Grand Prix	(South Africa) Kyalami Grand Prix Circuit, Midrand	1 March
2	Spanish Grand Prix	(Spain) Montjuïc Circuit, Barcelona	4 May
3	Monaco Grand Prix	Circuit de Monaco, Monte Carlo	18 May
4	Dutch Grand Prix	(Netherlands) Circuit Park Zandvoort, Zandvoort	21 June
5	French Grand Prix	(France) Circuit de Charade, Clermont-Ferrand	6 July
6	British Grand Prix	(United Kingdom) Silverstone Circuit, Silverstone	19 July
7	German Grand Prix	(West Germany) Nürburgring, Nürburg	3 August
8	Italian Grand Prix	(Italy) Autodromo Nazionale di Monza, Monza	7 September
9	Canadian Grand Prix	(Canada) Mosport Park, Bowmanville	20 September
10	United States Grand Prix	(United States) Watkins Glen International, New York	5 October
11	Mexican Grand Prix	Autódromo Magdalena Mixhuca, Mexico City	19 October

=== Calendar changes ===
- The South African Grand Prix remained the season opener, but was moved back from January to March.
- The Spanish Grand Prix was moved from Circuito Permanente del Jarama to Montjuïc Circuit, in keeping with the event-sharing arrangement between the two circuits. Likewise, the British Grand Prix was moved from Brands Hatch to Silverstone and the Canadian Grand Prix was moved from Circuit Mont-Tremblant to Mosport Park.
- The French Grand Prix was moved from Rouen-Les-Essarts to Circuit de Charade due to safety concerns that were made apparent by Jo Schlesser's fatal accident in the 1968 French Grand Prix.
- After the 1968 Mexican Grand Prix had been held in November to avoid a clash with the 1968 Summer Olympics in Mexico City, the Mexican Grand Prix was back at its usual date in October.

==== Cancelled rounds ====
The Belgian Grand Prix was originally to be held at Circuit de Spa-Francorchamps on 8 June, but Jackie Stewart, a strong advocate for safety in Formula One, had inspected the track and demanded multiple changes to the circuit. The track owners did not grant his wishes and the drivers boycotted the Grand Prix.

== Regulation changes ==
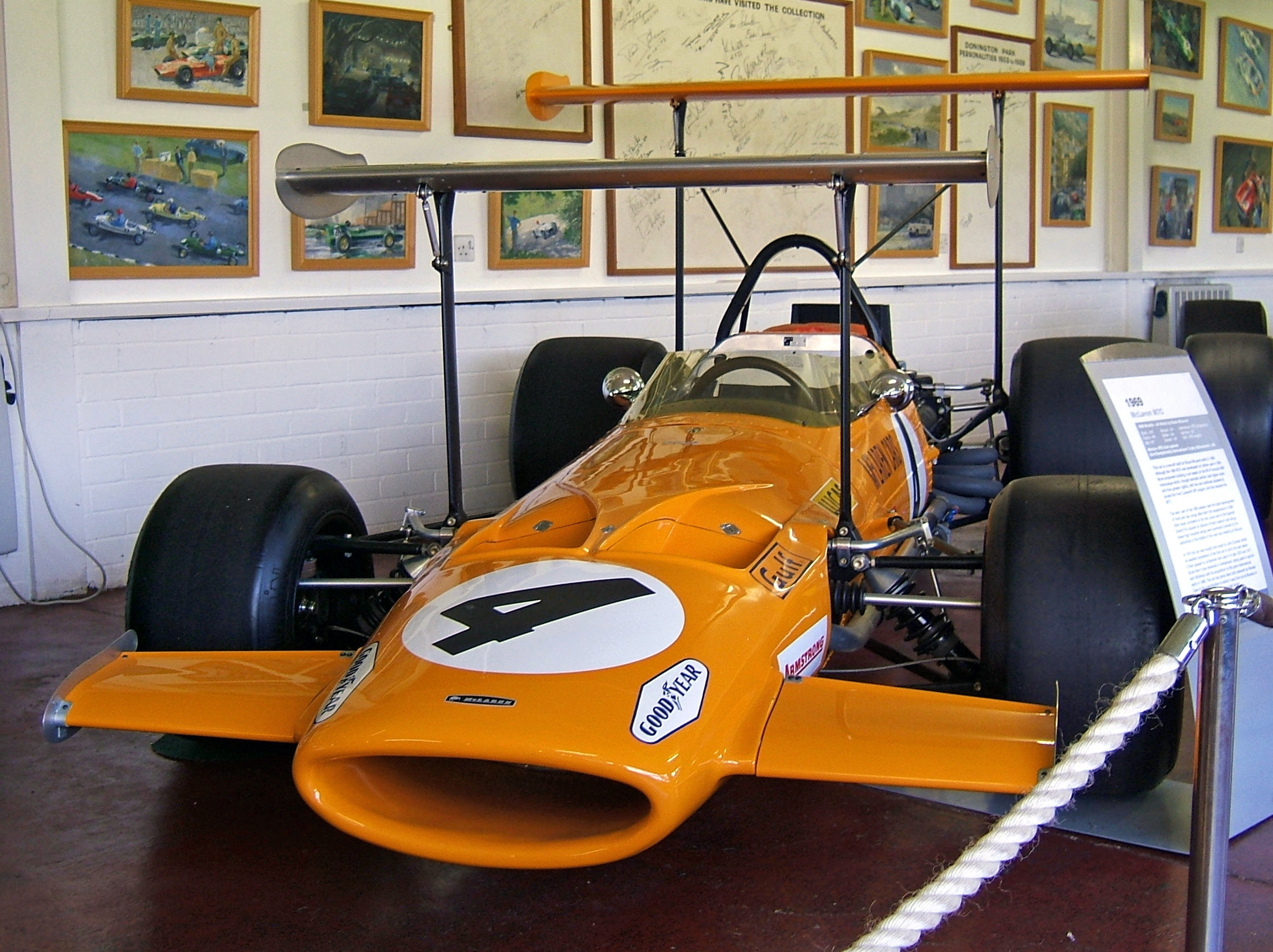
The McLaren M7C with early 1969 high-position wings attached, in the Donington Grand Prix Collection.

Aerodynamics had been the talk of the town since last season and most teams chose to implement front and rear wings, besides the front nose spoilers which had been around a little longer. Lotus had pioneered movable wings, operated by a fourth pedal at the driver's feet, and their rivals had used the winter stop to implement a system of their own. McLaren, for example, gave their drivers a lever next to their left hand to flatten the rear wing, giving more speed on the straight, and connected the brake pedal to the wing to automatically put the wing back to its original position and add downforce for the corner. Tyrrell Matra came up with an electrically operated rear wing, automatically flattening the rear wing when fifth gear was selected.

At the beginning of the season, the wings were positioned as high as possible to generate the most downforce and secured on the car's suspension to push the tyres into the ground. But when the 1969 Spanish Grand Prix featured several dramatic crashes, the FIA (then known as the Commission Sportive Internationale or CSI) banned all use of wings. Only the aerofoils on the nose were still allowed. This was suddenly decided after the first practice session of the Monaco Grand Prix.

From the next race on, wings would be allowed again, but only if there no movable parts, if they were rigidly attached to sprung parts of the bodywork (so not to the suspension) and fell within a certain maximum height and width. These rules were introduced for the Dutch Grand Prix and strictly enforced from the French Grand Prix on.

== Championship report ==
=== Rounds 1 to 4 ===
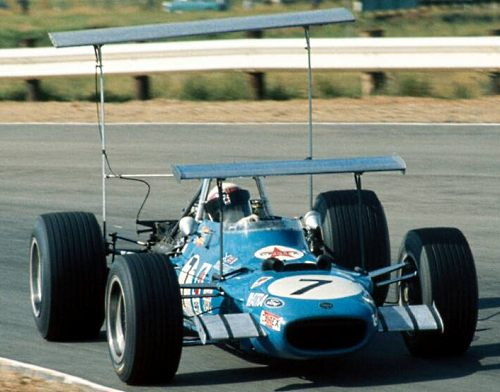
Jackie Stewart driving his Matra with the pre-ban wing design

During practice for the South African Grand Prix, reigning champion Graham Hill broke the pedal operating the wings, while the wings themselves broke on the cars of his Lotus teammates Jochen Rindt and Mario Andretti. The American driver had noticed that, when going through a fast corner, the wing leant sideways so far that it touched the rear tyre and twisted the struts. Three-time World Champion Jack Brabham qualified on pole position in the car bearing his name, ahead of Rindt and 1967 champion Denny Hulme. With Matra driver Jackie Stewart and Ferrari driver Chris Amon starting behind them, five different teams occupied the first two rows. At the start, Stewart got up to second behind Brabham, overtook the Australian before the end of the first lap, and then broke the lap record while still heavy on fuel. Brabham's rear wing collapsed on lap 5 and had both wings cut off in the pits. This allowed him to reach 283.78 km/h (176.33 mph) on the straight but made the car very unstable in the corners, and he decided to retire. Andretti inherited second place, but then retired with a gearbox failure, and Rindt suffered from a failing fuel pump. Stewart took an unchallenged victory, ahead of Hill and Hulme.

For the first time, the Spanish Grand Prix was run at Montjuïc circuit (although the street circuit had existed since 1933). During practice, Rindt hit a stray dog and damaged his suspension but still managed to qualify on pole, ahead of Amon and Hill. Stewart and Brabham qualified on the second row. Only twelve drivers managed to start the race and Hill crashed out after just six laps, but Rindt led away without trouble. On lap 20, however, his rear wing collapsed while travelling 225 km/h (140 mph) and he crashed into the Armco barrier. He hit the wreckage of Hill's car and then overturned. He was taken into hospital and would miss the next race. Amon inherited the lead with almost 40 seconds over Stewart, until his engine blew on lap 56. While Jacky Ickx was in second place, his wing collapsed, necessating a pit stop, and later, his Brabham's rear wishbone broke, making retirement unavoidable. Once again, Stewart was unchallenged, two full laps ahead of Bruce McLaren and teammate Jean-Pierre Beltoise.

Going into the Monaco Grand Prix, one could have expected unified actions to control the high and fragile wings, but it took the CSI (FIA) until after the first practice was already run. In the meantime, Matra had added even more aerodynamic pieces to their cars' noses and Ferrari had implemented an hydraulically-controlled wing. Stewart set a lap time that looked unbeatable, but when all aerofoils and wings were banned, the FIA also scrapped all times from Thursday practice. After this reset, Stewart was again fastest and qualified on pole, ahead of Ferrari driver Amon and Matra teammate Beltoise, but all three of them retired within six laps of each other. With Brabham and Ickx failing to finish as well, Hill took an easy win, a record fifth victory in Monaco, ahead of Piers Courage, driving a Brabham for Frank Williams Racing Cars, and Jo Siffert, driving a Lotus for Rob Walker Racing Team.

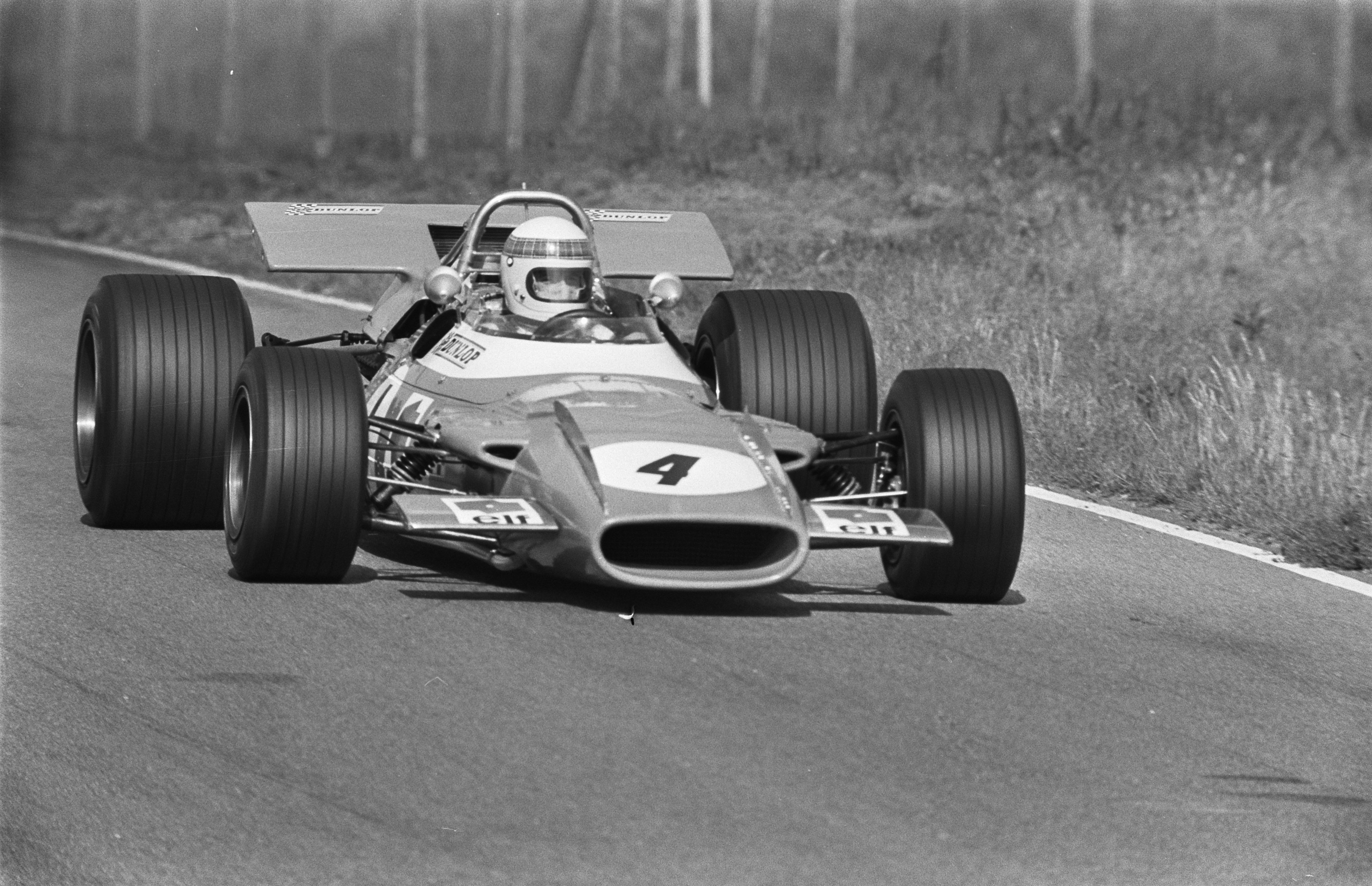
Jackie Stewart during the Dutch Grand Prix, with his Matra adjusted to the new rules on wings.

The ban on movable wings was still active during the Dutch Grand Prix, but the CSI now allowed aerodynamic devices if they were fixed to the bodywork (and not to the suspension) and could not move. With the regulations formulated quite loosely, though, teams provoked the Dutch scrutineers with some daring designs, only some of which were banned. Furthermore, Matra and Lotus introduced four-wheel drive cars, but only tried them out in practice. Rindt qualified on pole, with Stewart and Hill next to him, and it was the reigning champion that reached the end of the straight first. With Stewart regelated back to third, Lotus could control the race, but instead, started fighting each other, with Rindt taking the lead on lap 3, while going off track with two wheels. The Austrian then pulled out a ten-second lead, leaving Hill vulnerable to Stewart's offense. The Scot moved up to second place, but in terms of pace was losing out, until Rindt suffered a drive shaft failure on lap 16. With the Matra let loose and free to take the win, eyes turned to the battle behind him. Siffert clinched second place with a daring move round the outside of Tarzan corner, and after Hill had to make an unforeseen pit stop, it was Amon that scored a third place for Ferrari.

In the Drivers' Championship, Jackie Stewart (Matra) was leading with 27 points, ahead of Graham Hill (Lotus) with 15 and Jo Siffert (Lotus) with 13. For the Manufacturers' Cup, Matra was leading the standings with 27 points, ahead of Lotus (21) and McLaren (15).

=== Rounds 5 to 8 ===
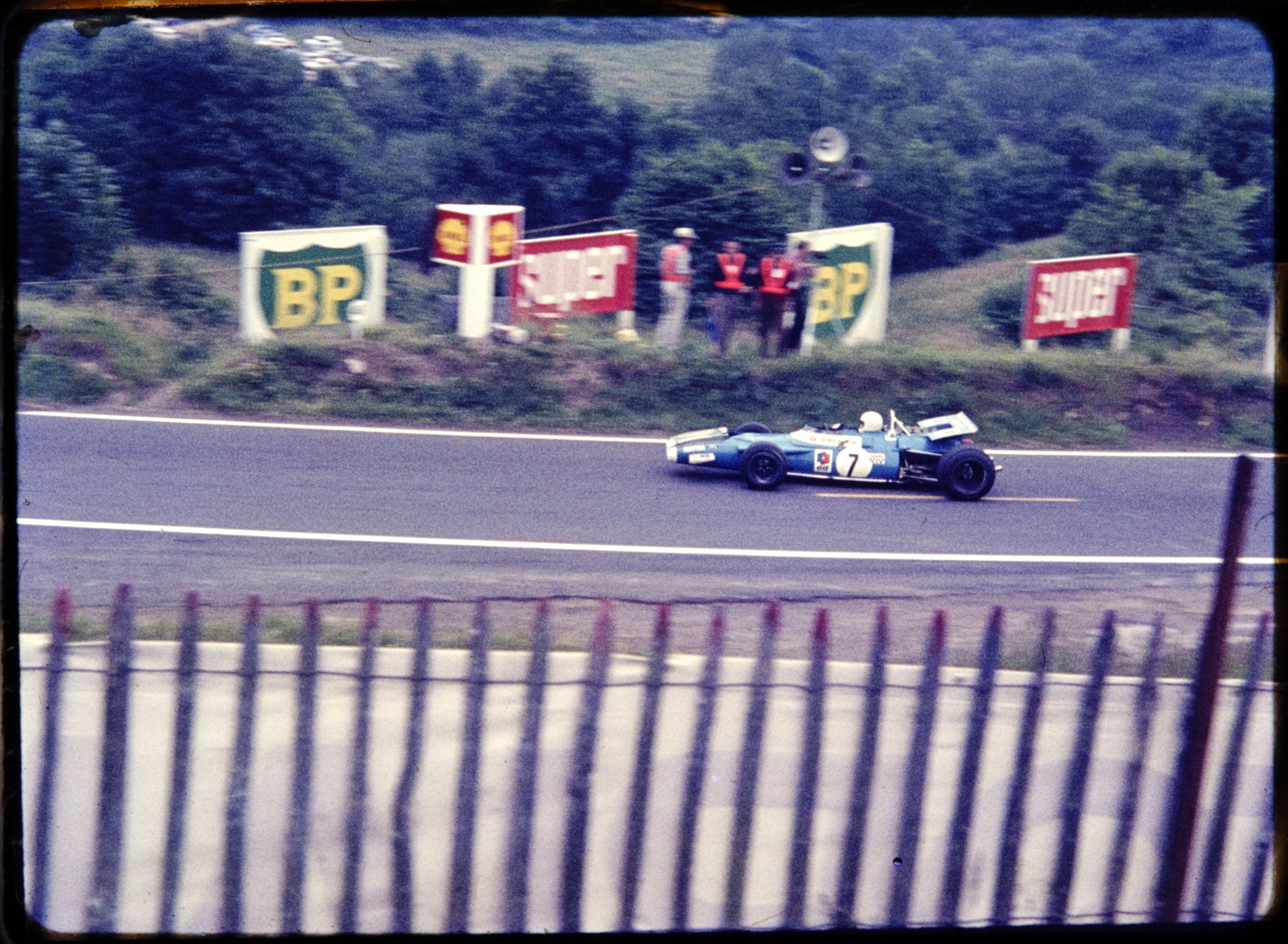
Local hero Jean-Pierre Beltoise driving towards his second-place finish in the French Grand Prix

With the rules on aerodynamic devices now formalised, the French Grand Prix would likely show who the favourites would be for the title. And first of all, it was Jackie Stewart claiming pole position for Matra, ahead of 1967 champion Denny Hulme for McLaren and Jochen Rindt for Lotus. Reigning champion Graham Hill started down in eighth, out of just thirteen entrants. The Lotus 63 was prepared for their Formula Three driver John Miles, giving him the honour to make the first ever start in a four-wheel drive Formula One car. He did retire with a broken fuel pump, however, on the first lap. Stewart, meanwhile, took an easy win, with his teammate and home hero Jean-Pierre Beltoise finishing in second, and Belgian driver Jacky Ickx completing the podium in his Brabham.

During practice for the British Grand Prix, it was again Stewart who set the pace from the beginning, and he was comfortable to switch to the four-wheel drive Matra MS84. McLaren launched their four-wheel drive car, the M9A-1, while Lotus came prepared with two four-wheel drive cars, having convinced Hill to give it a try. But it was Rindt in the two-wheel drive Lotus 49B that gave Stewart a real run for his money: the Austrian came within two tenths of a second of the Scot, who felt another defensive lap was necessary. Going through the last corner, however, he hit a loose kerb and crashed backwards into the wall. Regulations at the time stated that positions on the starting grid were decided by the fastest time set in the car that actually started the race. Given that the Matra was irreparable in the time available and Stewart had to take over his teammate's car, the stewards took Stewart's fastest time in that car and placed him second on the grid. At the start, Rindt managed to just stay ahead and the two rivals sailed away into the distance. Sixth-starting John Surtees got up to third, but his suspension collapsed before the first lap was completed, giving the place to Hulme. Stewart took the lead on lap 6 but had to hand it back on lap 16, when the pair came across Beltoise, trying to find his feet in the MS84. Hulme retired with a faulty ignition, giving way to Bruce McLaren, who was then passed by Jacky Ickx. On lap 62, Rindt's rear wing collapsed and he had to pit. This handed Stewart his fifth win in six races, ahead of Ickx and McLaren. Rindt came home in fourth.

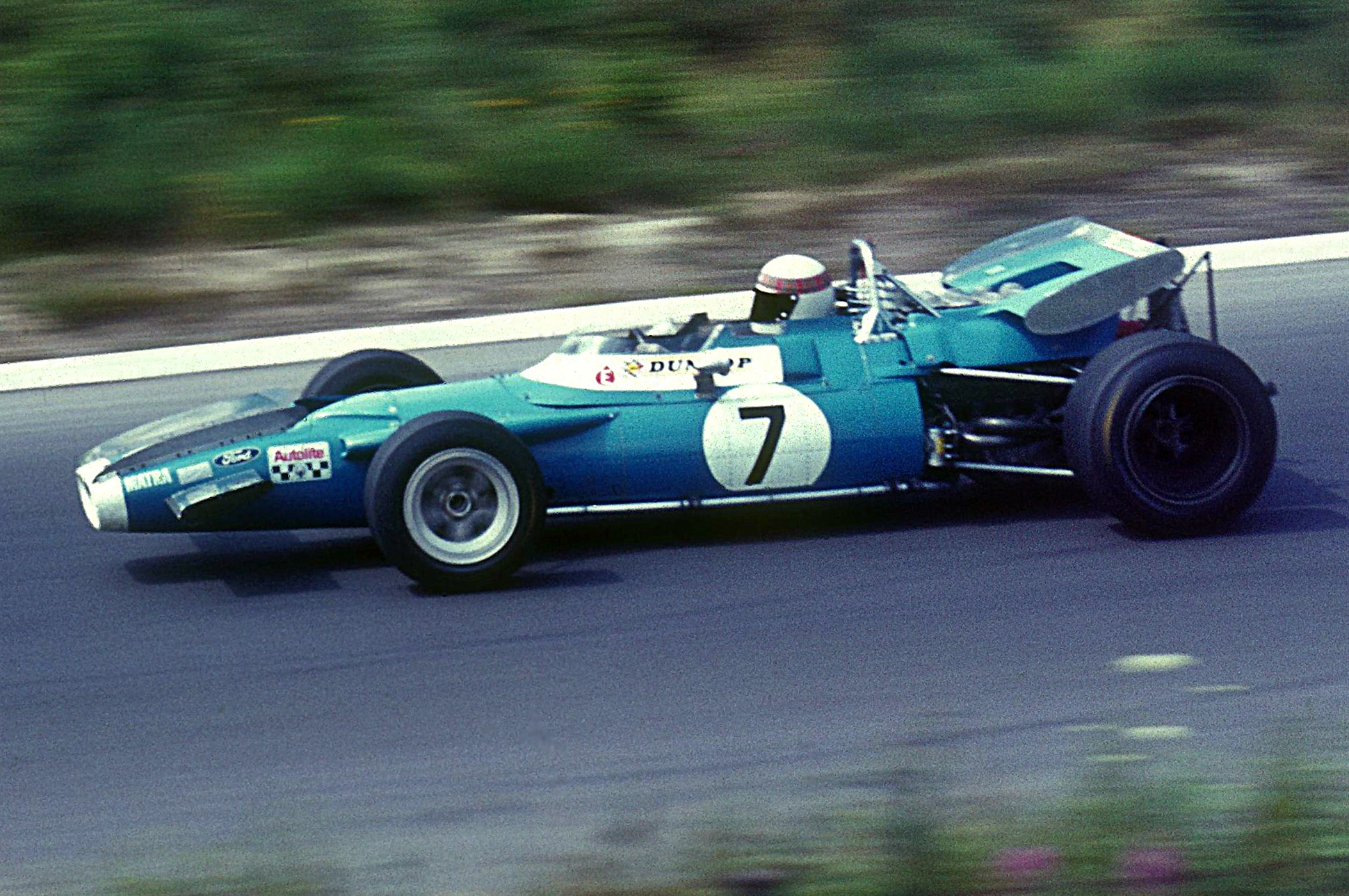
Jackie Stewart had to settle for second in the German Grand Prix

For the German Grand Prix, twelve Formula Two cars complemented the grid, and one of them, Gerhard Mitter, was sadly killed during practice. On the F1 grid, it was Ickx who set his first pole position of the year, ahead of Stewart and Rindt, and the Belgian made a good start. Mario Andretti, coming over from the United States to further develop the four-wheel drive Lotus, slowed down during the first lap and saw Vic Elford crashing into him and flying into the trees. The McLaren driver broke his arm in three places. Meanwhile, Ickx fell back to fourth place, but he made an inspired recovery to second place. He closed up and the leading pair went nose-to-tail for two full laps. Ickx made a heroic pass under braking, but locked up, and Stewart held on. On lap 6, the Brabham took the lead firmly and quickly set a lap record. He eventually took the win with a minute advantage over the championship leader. Bruce McLaren and Graham Hill finished third and fourth, respectively.

Ickx had climbed up to second place in the standings, but was looking at such a distance to Stewart, that the championship would be decided at the Italian Grand Prix if the Scot managed to win the race. During qualifying, he did not manage more than third, behind Rindt and Hulme, but overtook the New Zealander at the start and the Austrian later in the first lap. Ickx had to pit when his oil pressure dropped. The three at the front traded places a couple of times, with a group of five drivers behind them joining in the slipstream battle. Hill had started in ninth but was charging Stewart for the lead near the end of the race, until his drive shaft broke with four laps to go. After at least fourteen lead changes and even a lot more in the remaining points-paying positions, it was Stewart's teammate Beltoise who made a do-or-die move into the last corner of the race. He went too fast and ran wide, but hindered Rindt while doing so, which was just as good a result. The top four finished within 0.19 seconds of each other and Stewart was given the win, ahead of Rindt, Beltoise and McLaren. Ickx had retired three laps from the end when he ran out of fuel.

His sixth win of the season gave Jackie Stewart (Matra) an unsurmountable lead in the Drivers' Championship. He stood at 60 points, ahead of Bruce McLaren (McLaren) with 24 and Jacky Ickx (Brabham) with 22. Matra now also had enough to be awarded the Manufacturers' Cup with 60 points, ahead of Lotus with 34 and Brabham with 30.

=== Rounds 9 to 11 ===
After he was injured in a testing accident in June, triple World Champion Jack Brabham returned to the grid for the Canadian Grand Prix. He would finish this season and then retire, also selling his shares of the Brabham team to co-founder Ron Tauranac. In practice, at least three drivers spun or crashed out on the slippery sandy surface of Mosport, but Jacky Ickx managed to qualify on pole position, five tenths ahead of the competition. It was Jochen Rindt, however, that took the lead into the first corner, before freshly crowned champion Jackie Stewart snatched it on lap 6. Behind the leaders, Jean-Pierre Beltoise collided with local driver Al Pease, who was already being lapped before a quarter of the race was run. After this, the Canadian was disqualified for "driving too slowly", the only time that has ever happened. On lap 33, Ickx overtook Stewart, but their wheels struck and they both spun. Stewart landed in a ditch and stalled his engine, but Ickx could continue to take a suddenly easy victory. Jack Brabham finished second, the Australian's first podium of the year, ahead of Rindt in third. Johnny Servoz-Gavin finished sixth, scoring the first and only ever championship point in a four-wheel drive Formula One car.

The United States Grand Prix was the penultimate round of the championship and saw Rindt take his fifth pole position of the year, ahead of Hulme and Stewart. Ickx started down in eighth after a hair-raising spin off the track in practice. After the start, Rindt and Stewart left the field behind and the Scot took the lead on lap 12, when the Austrian made a slight error. Rindt kept pressing, however, and was back in front on lap 21, the two already running half a lap ahead of the competition. On lap 36, Stewart's engine suffered an oil leak and he had to retire, leaving Rindt to take, after seven career podiums, his first victory. 1968 champion Graham Hill suffered a flat tyre and spun off. His car hit the banks and turning over, violently throwing him out of the car. Hill broke both his legs. Ickx had also retired, so there was room for some other names on the podium: Piers Courage was second in the Brabham run by Frank Williams Racing Cars and 1964 champion John Surtees was third for BRM.

In qualifying for the Mexican Grand Prix, Jack Brabham claimed pole with a new lap record. Going into his supposedly final race, the Australian had lost none of his speed, beating the old record by more than a second. Ickx and Stewart started beside him on the front row, and it was the Scot who took the lead, before Ickx took it on lap 2. Stewart then fell back a bit, with fourth-starting Hulme rising to the occasion. On lap 10, the McLaren passed the Brabham for the lead and sailed away. Ickx made two attempts later in the race but was unable to pass the New Zealander, finishing 2.5 seconds behind him. Jack Brabham finished third, Stewart fourth.

Jackie Stewart (Matra) finished first in the Drivers' Championship with 63 points, ahead of Jacky Ickx (Brabham) with 37 and Bruce McLaren (McLaren) with 26. In the standings for the Manufacturers' Cup, Matra had achieved 66 points, ahead of Brabham with 49 and Lotus with 47.

== Results and standings ==
=== Grands Prix ===
Round	Grand Prix	Pole position	Fastest lap	Winning driver	Winning constructor	Tyre	Report
1	(South Africa) South African Grand Prix	(Australia) Jack Brabham	(United Kingdom) Jackie Stewart	(United Kingdom) Jackie Stewart	(France) Matra-Ford	D	Report
2	(Spain) Spanish Grand Prix	(Austria) Jochen Rindt	(Austria) Jochen Rindt	(United Kingdom) Jackie Stewart	(France) Matra-Ford	D	Report
3	Monaco Grand Prix	(United Kingdom) Jackie Stewart	(United Kingdom) Jackie Stewart	(United Kingdom) Graham Hill	(United Kingdom) Lotus-Ford	F	Report
4	(Netherlands) Dutch Grand Prix	(Austria) Jochen Rindt	(United Kingdom) Jackie Stewart	(United Kingdom) Jackie Stewart	(France) Matra-Ford	D	Report
5	(France) French Grand Prix	(United Kingdom) Jackie Stewart	(United Kingdom) Jackie Stewart	(United Kingdom) Jackie Stewart	(France) Matra-Ford	D	Report
6	(United Kingdom) British Grand Prix	(Austria) Jochen Rindt	(United Kingdom) Jackie Stewart	(United Kingdom) Jackie Stewart	(France) Matra-Ford	D	Report
7	(West Germany) German Grand Prix	(Belgium) Jacky Ickx	(Belgium) Jacky Ickx	(Belgium) Jacky Ickx	(United Kingdom) Brabham-Ford	G	Report
8	(Italy) Italian Grand Prix	(Austria) Jochen Rindt	(France) Jean-Pierre Beltoise	(United Kingdom) Jackie Stewart	(France) Matra-Ford	D	Report
9	(Canada) Canadian Grand Prix	(Belgium) Jacky Ickx	(Belgium) Jacky Ickx (Australia) Jack Brabham	(Belgium) Jacky Ickx	(United Kingdom) Brabham-Ford	G	Report
10	United States Grand Prix	(Austria) Jochen Rindt	(Austria) Jochen Rindt	(Austria) Jochen Rindt	(United Kingdom) Lotus-Ford	F	Report
11	(Mexico) Mexican Grand Prix	(Australia) Jack Brabham	(Belgium) Jacky Ickx	(New Zealand) Denny Hulme	(United Kingdom) McLaren-Ford	G	Report

=== Scoring system ===
Points were awarded to the top six classified finishers. Formula 2 cars were not eligible for Championship points. The International Cup for F1 Manufacturers only counted the points of the highest-finishing driver for each race. For both the Championship and the Cup, the best five results from rounds 1-6 and the best four results from rounds 7-11 were counted.

Numbers without parentheses are championship points; numbers in parentheses are total points scored. Points were awarded in the following system:

Position	1st	2nd	3rd	4th	5th	6th
Race	9	6	4	3	2	1

=== World Drivers' Championship standings ===
Pos.	Driver	RSA (South Africa)	ESP (Spain)	MON (Monaco)	NED (Netherlands)	FRA (France)	GBR (United Kingdom)	GER (West Germany)	ITA (Italy)	CAN (Canada)	USA (United States)	MEX (Mexico)	Pts.
1	(United Kingdom) Jackie Stewart	1^{F}	1	Ret^{P}^{F}	1^{F}	1^{P}^{F}	1^{F}	2	1	Ret	Ret	4	63
2	(Belgium) Jacky Ickx	Ret	6	Ret	5	3	2	1^{P}^{F}	10	1^{P}^{F}	Ret	2^{F}	37
3	(New Zealand) Bruce McLaren	5	2	5	Ret	4	3	3	4	5	DNS	DNS	26
4	(Austria) Jochen Rindt	Ret	Ret^{P}^{F}		Ret^{P}	Ret	4^{P}	Ret	2^{P}	3	1^{P}^{F}	Ret	22
5	(France) Jean-Pierre Beltoise	6	3	Ret	8	2	9	12	3^{F}	4	Ret	5	21
6	(New Zealand) Denny Hulme	3	4	6	4	8	Ret	Ret	7	Ret	Ret	1	20
7	(United Kingdom) Graham Hill	2	Ret	1	7	6	7	4	9	Ret	Ret		19
8	(United Kingdom) Piers Courage		Ret	2	Ret	Ret	5	Ret	5	Ret	2	10	16
9	(Switzerland) Jo Siffert	4	Ret	3	2	9	8	11	8	Ret	Ret	Ret	15
10	(Australia) Jack Brabham	Ret^{P}	Ret	Ret	6				Ret	2^{F}	4	3^{P}	14
11	(United Kingdom) John Surtees	Ret	5	Ret	9		Ret	DNS	NC	Ret	3	Ret	6
12	(New Zealand) Chris Amon	Ret	Ret	Ret	3	Ret	Ret						4
13	(United Kingdom) Richard Attwood			4				6^{1}					3
14	(United Kingdom) Vic Elford			7	10	5	6	Ret					3
15	(Mexico) Pedro Rodríguez	Ret	Ret	Ret			Ret		6	Ret	5	7	3
16	(Switzerland) Silvio Moser			Ret	Ret	7			Ret	Ret	6	11	1
17	(United Kingdom) Jackie Oliver	7	Ret	Ret	Ret		Ret	Ret	Ret	Ret	Ret	6	1
18	(France) Johnny Servoz-Gavin							Ret^{1}		6	NC	8	1
—	(Rhodesia) Sam Tingle	8											0
—	(United States) Pete Lovely									7	Ret	9	0
—	(United Kingdom) John Miles					Ret	10		Ret	Ret		Ret	0
—	(Canada) Bill Brack									NC			0
—	(United States) Mario Andretti	Ret						Ret			Ret		0
—	(Sweden) Jo Bonnier						Ret	Ret					0
—	(Canada) George Eaton										Ret	Ret	0
—	(South Africa) Peter de Klerk	NC											0
—	(South Africa) Basil van Rooyen	Ret											0
—	(Rhodesia) John Love	Ret											0
—	(United Kingdom) Derek Bell						Ret						0
—	(Canada) John Cordts									Ret			0
—	(Canada) Al Pease									DSQ			0
—	(Italy) Ernesto Brambilla								DNS				0
Drivers ineligible for Formula One points, because they drove with Formula Two cars
—	(France) Henri Pescarolo							5					
—	(West Germany) Kurt Ahrens Jr.							7					
—	(West Germany) Rolf Stommelen							8					
—	(United Kingdom) Peter Westbury							9					
—	(Switzerland) Xavier Perrot							10					
—	(France) François Cevert							Ret					
—	(West Germany) Gerhard Mitter							DNS					
—	(West Germany) Hubert Hahne							DNS					
—	(Austria) Dieter Quester							DNS					
—	(West Germany) Hans Herrmann							DNS					
Pos.	Driver	RSA (South Africa)	ESP (Spain)	MON (Monaco)	NED (Netherlands)	FRA (France)	GBR (United Kingdom)	GER (West Germany)	ITA (Italy)	CAN (Canada)	USA (United States)	MEX (Mexico)	Pts.

Key
Colour	Result
Gold	Winner
Silver	Second place
Bronze	Third place
Green	Other points position
Blue	Other classified position
Blue	Not classified, finished (NC)
Purple	Not classified, retired (Ret)
Red	Did not qualify (DNQ)
Black	Disqualified (DSQ)
White	Did not start (DNS)
White	Race cancelled (C)
Blank	Did not practice (DNP)
Blank	Excluded (EX)
Blank	Did not arrive (DNA)
Blank	Withdrawn (WD)
Blank	Did not enter (empty cell)
Annotation	Meaning
P	Pole position
F	Fastest lap

- ^{1} – Ineligible for Formula One points, because they drove with Formula Two cars.

Formula 2 cars occupied the positions between fifth and tenth at the German GP, but the drivers who drove these cars did not earn points for the championship. The fifth and sixth points went to the eleventh and twelfth in the race, Siffert and Beltoise.

=== International Cup for F1 Manufacturers standings ===
Pos.	Manufacturer	RSA (South Africa)	ESP (Spain)	MON (Monaco)	NED (Netherlands)	FRA (France)	GBR (United Kingdom)	GER (West Germany)	ITA (Italy)	CAN (Canada)	USA (United States)	MEX (Mexico)	Pts.
1	(France) Matra-Ford	1	1	Ret	1	1	1	2	1	4	NC	4	66
2	(United Kingdom) Brabham-Ford	Ret	6	2	5	3	2	1	(5)	1	2	2	49 (51)
3	(United Kingdom) Lotus-Ford	2	Ret	1	2	6	4	4	2	3	1	9	47
4	(United Kingdom) McLaren-Ford	3	2	(5)	4	4	3	3	4	5	Ret	1	38 (40)
5	(United Kingdom) BRM	7	5	Ret	9		Ret	Ret	NC	NC	3	6	7
6	(Italy) Ferrari	Ret	Ret	Ret	3	Ret	Ret		6	Ret	5	7	7
—	(United Kingdom) Cooper-Maserati			7						WD			0
—	(United Kingdom) Brabham-Repco	8											0
—	(United Kingdom) Brabham-Climax									Ret			0
—	(United States) Eagle-Climax									DSQ			0
Pos.	Manufacturer	RSA (South Africa)	ESP (Spain)	MON (Monaco)	NED (Netherlands)	FRA (France)	GBR (United Kingdom)	GER (West Germany)	ITA (Italy)	CAN (Canada)	USA (United States)	MEX (Mexico)	Pts.

- Bold results counted to championship totals.

== Non-championship races ==
Other Formula One races were held in 1969, which did not count towards the World Championship. The Madrid Grand Prix and Gold Cup were held concurrently with Formula 5000 cars.

Race name	Circuit	Date	Winning driver	Constructor	Report
(United Kingdom) IV Race of Champions	Brands Hatch	16 March	(United Kingdom) Jackie Stewart	(France) Matra-Cosworth	Report
(United Kingdom) XXI BRDC International Trophy	Silverstone	30 March	(Australia) Jack Brabham	(United Kingdom) Brabham-Cosworth	Report
(Spain) Madrid Grand Prix	Jarama	13 April	(United Kingdom) Keith Holland	(United Kingdom) Lola-Chevrolet	Report
(United Kingdom) XVI International Gold Cup	Oulton Park	16 August	(Belgium) Jacky Ickx	(United Kingdom) Brabham-Cosworth	Report
