= All American Racers =

American motor racing team and constructor

- Base: Rye, East Sussex, UK and Santa Ana, California, USA
- Founder(s): Dan Gurney

Formula One World Championship career
- First entry: 1966 Belgian Grand Prix
- Races entered: 25
- Engines: Climax, Weslake
- Constructors' Championships: 0
- Drivers' Championships: 0
- Race victories: 1
- Podiums: 2
- Pole positions: 0
- Fastest laps: 2
- Final entry: 1969 Canadian Grand Prix

All American Racers
Career
- Debut: 1979 Arizona Republic / Jimmy Bryan 150 (Phoenix)
- Latest race: 1999 Marlboro 500 (Fontana)
- Races competed: 134
- Drivers' Championships: 0
- Indy 500 victories: 0
- Race victories: 1
- Pole positions: 1

All American Racers is an American-licensed auto racing team and constructor based in Santa Ana, California. Founded by Dan Gurney and Carroll Shelby in 1964, All American Racers initially participated in American sports car and Champ Car races as well as international Formula One events with cars named Eagle. The Formula One team, based in the United Kingdom and using British-built Weslake engines was named Anglo American Racers. Under team manager Bill Dunne they set up shop in Rye, East Sussex. The team were adjacent to Harry Weslake's engine development plant and half a mile from Elva cars. They participated in 25 Grands Prix, entering a total of 34 cars.

The first Eagles were created after AAR entered a Goodyear-backed Lotus 38 in the 1965 Indianapolis 500 and Gurney hired former Lotus designer Len Terry to develop their own car for 1966. The resulting Ford-powered Eagle T2G was codeveloped with the Eagle T1G for Formula 1. After exiting Formula One in 1968 and concentrating on Champ Car, Eagle turned to sports car racing in the 1980s, partnering with Toyota to develop the Celica and later sports prototypes for the IMSA GT Championship.

The company built the Ben Bowlby-designed DeltaWing that was run by Highcroft Racing at the 2012 24 Hours of Le Mans.

== Formula 1 ==
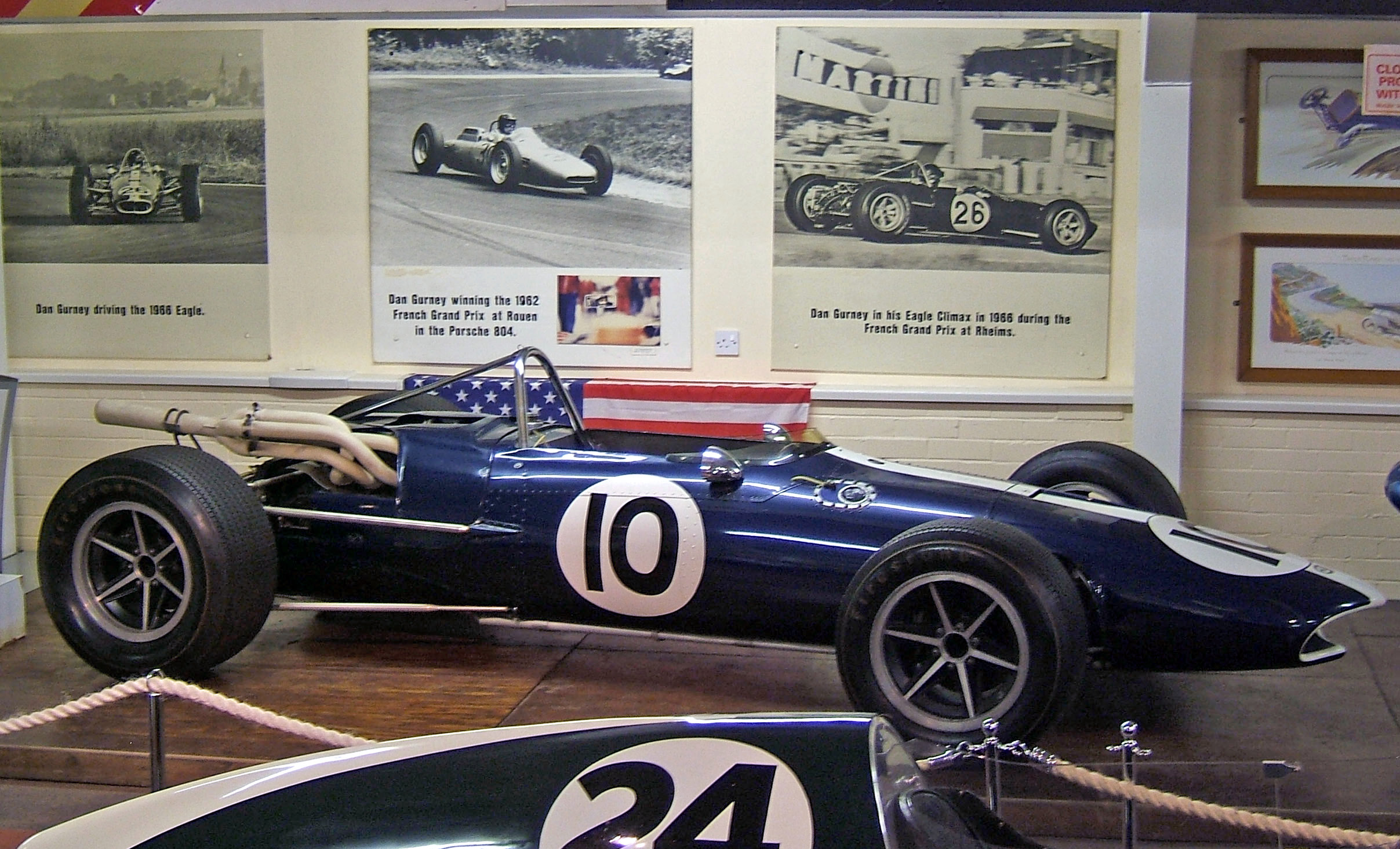
An Eagle Mk1, in early, four-cylinder Climax-engined T1F form. The car wears the Imperial blue paint, the national racing colour of the United States.

In order to run the Formula 1 operations, Gurney established the Anglo American Racers team, based in Rye, East Sussex, UK, though the cars were built in Santa Ana, California, USA by the All American Racers team. The Eagle T1G car, powered by an obsolete Coventry Climax engine, debuted at the 1966 Belgian Grand Prix and scored its first points with a fifth place three weeks later at the French Grand Prix. For the 1967 season Richie Ginther was signed as a second driver. The Climax engine was replaced by a new 3-liter Weslake V12 engine designed by Aubrey Woods and built in Great Britain by Weslake.

At the 1967 Belgian Grand Prix Gurney achieved the first "all-American" victory in a Grand Prix since Jimmy Murphy´s triumph with Duesenberg at the 1921 French Grand Prix. Excluding the Indianapolis 500, this is the only win for a USA-built car as well as one of only two wins of an American-licensed constructor (along with the triumph of Penske at the 1976 Austrian Grand Prix) in Formula One.

== USAC & CART Champ Car ==
During the USAC years, the Eagle chassis was very successful in the late 1960s and 1970s. Eagles won 51 Champ Car races, including the 1968 and 1975 Indy 500's won by Bobby Unser and the 1973 race won by Gordon Johncock. During this two-decade period, Bobby Unser, who drove Eagle cars for most of his teams, joined AAR as the sole driver, winning the 1975 Indianapolis 500. Unser also claimed 22 wins and 52 podiums with Eagle cars. After Unser's departure from the team for Team Penske, All American Racers started to lose their edge in IndyCar competition. Mike Mosley won a few races for the team before being dismissed at the end of 1982. By 1984, AAR merged with Mike Curb's team to form Curb-All American Racers. After a two-year partnership with Curb, Gurney and Curb parted ways, and this marked the beginning of the end of AAR's time in IndyCar.

The All American Racers team was inactive in single-seaters from 1987 to 1995 and returned in 1996 again building their own chassis and using new Toyota engines. However, this new effort, a combination of new and untested equipment, did not prove to be successful, never winning a race and collecting only occasional top-tens. The team ceased active racing after the 1999 CART season.

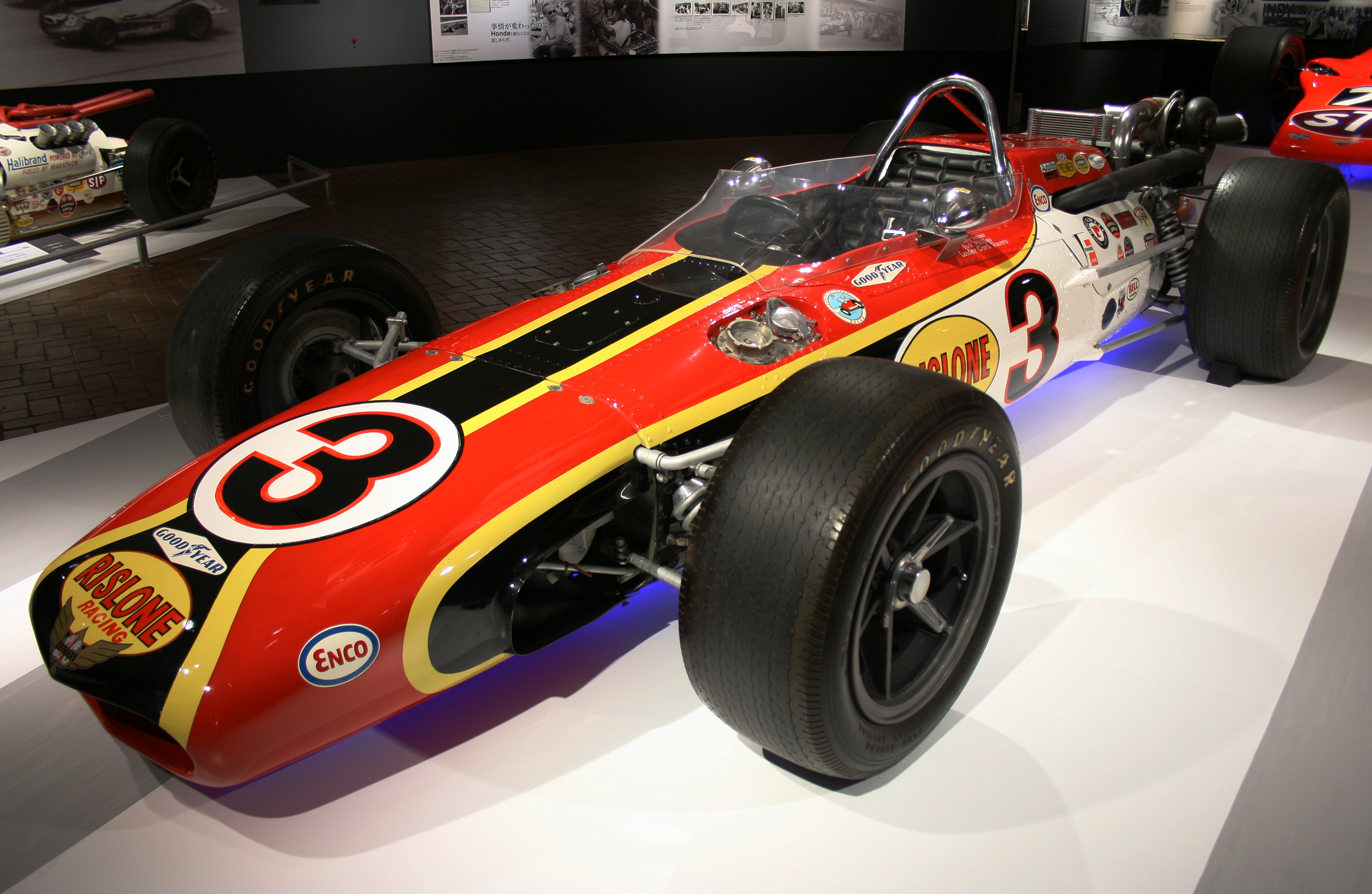
1968 Indianapolis 500-winning chassis, driven by Bobby Unser, Offenhauser turbo

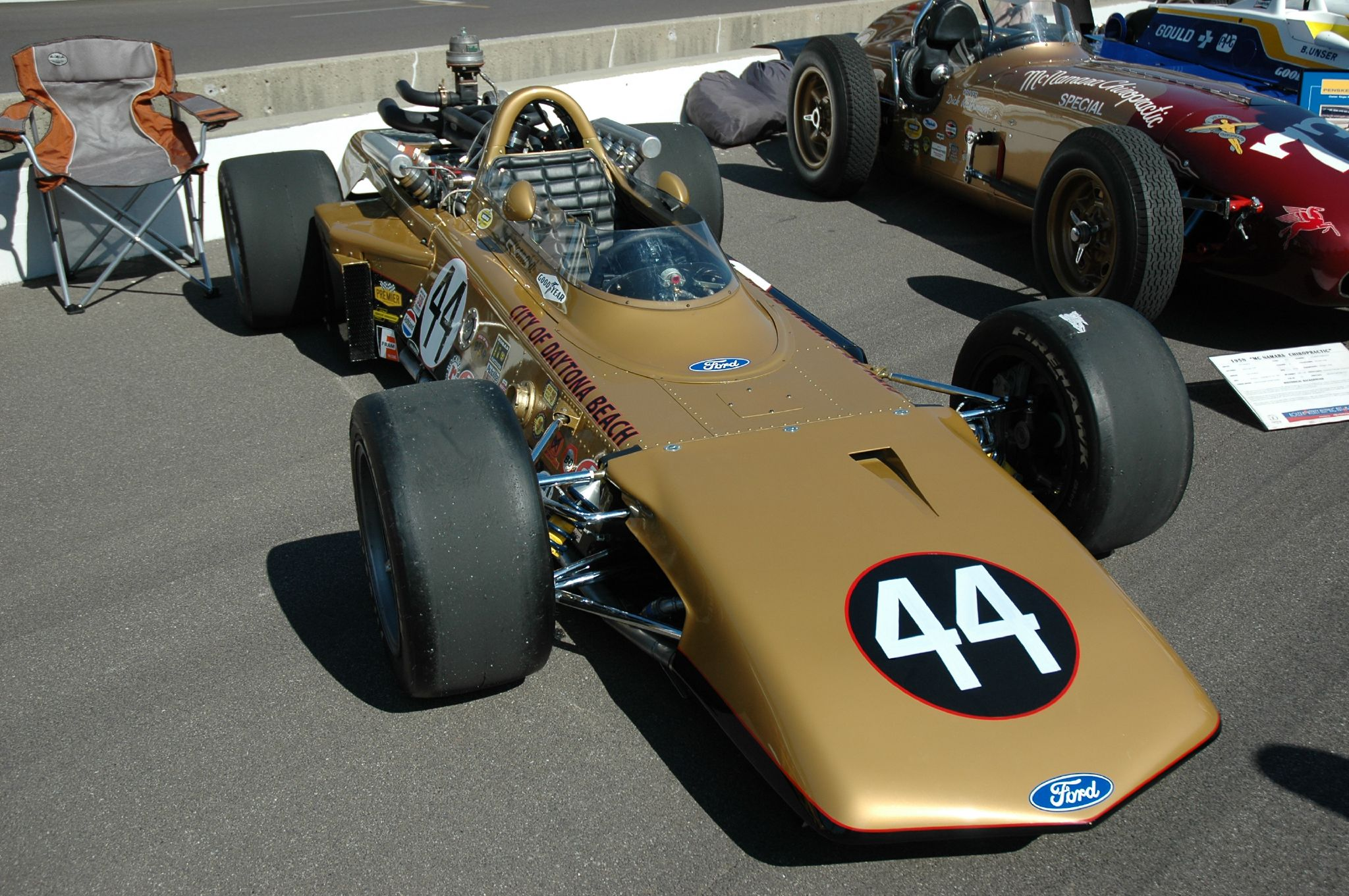
The Eagle 68, powered by a turbocharged Ford Indy V8 engine, driven to 6th place in the 1969 Indianapolis 500 by Joe Leonard

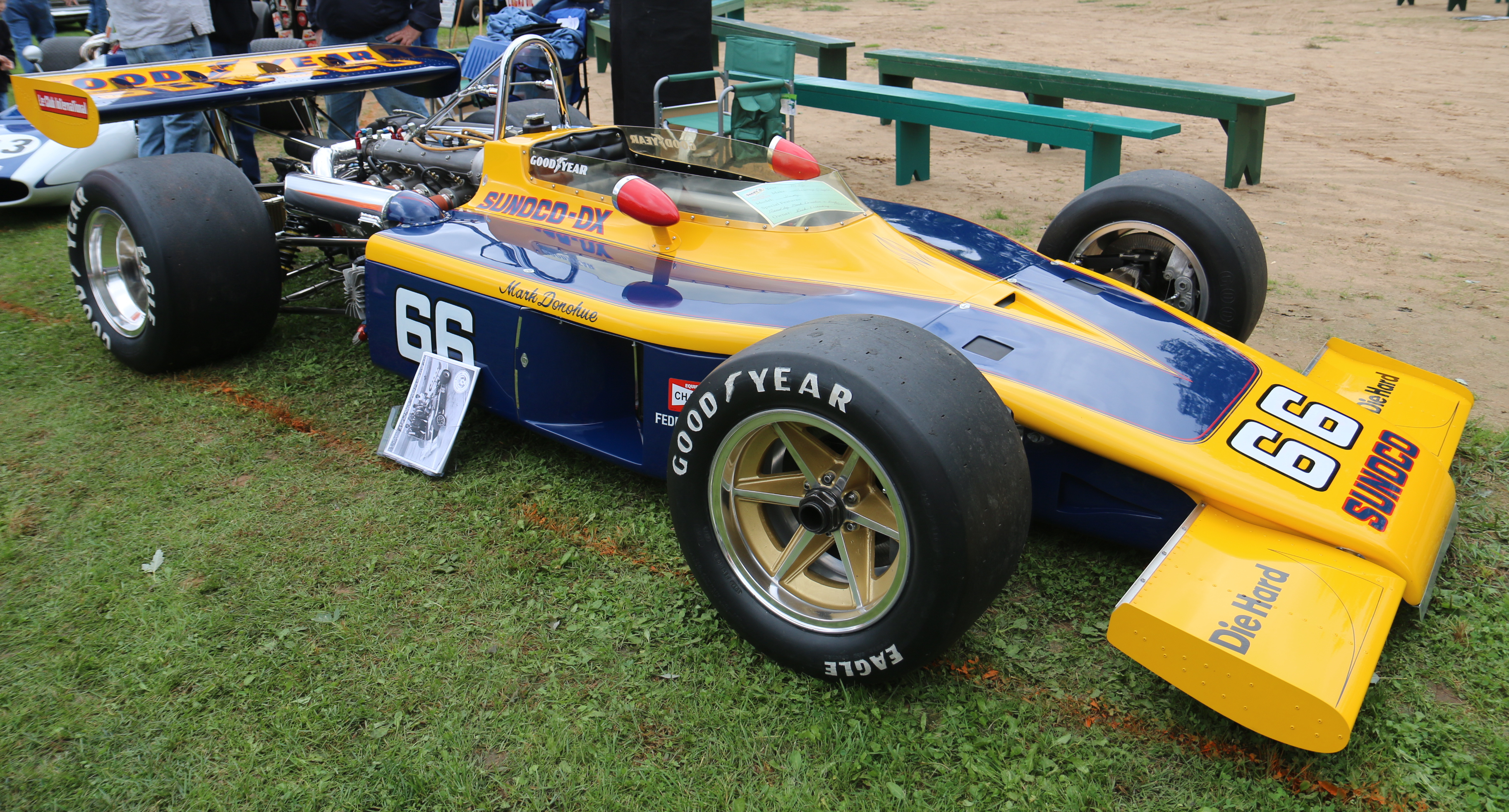
1972 Gurney-Eagle Indycar chassis driven by Mark Donohue

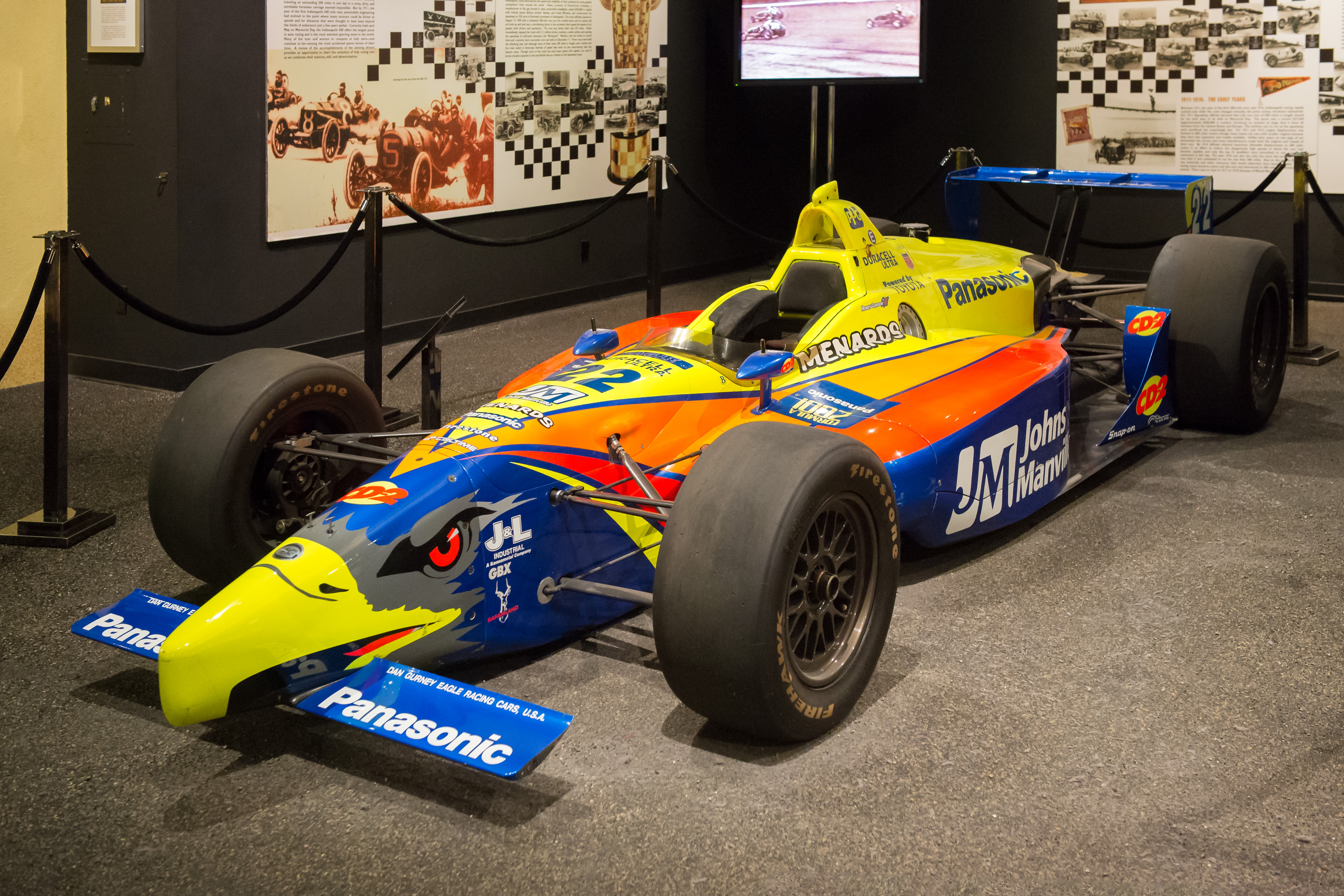
The Eagle 997 was the final CART car designed by AAR.

=== CART/USAC drivers ===
- Alex Barron (1998–1999)
- Raul Boesel (1999)
- Geoff Brabham (1981)
- Mike Chandler (1982, 1984)
- Kevin Cogan (1984–1985)
- Juan Manuel Fangio II (1996–1997)
- Pete Halsmer (1984)
- P. J. Jones (1996–1998)
- Jan Lammers (1986)
- Bobby Unser (1972–1978, USAC)
- Andrea Montermini (1999)
- Rocky Moran (1981)
- Mike Mosley (1979–1981)
- Ed Pimm (1984–1985)
- Gualter Salles (1999)
- Tom Sneva (1985)
- Vincenzo Sospiri (1998)

=== Eagle MK-V ===
The Eagle MK-V was the third to last Eagle CART, and the first original chassis following post-1986 inactivity. It was entered exclusively by Eagle and only for the 1996 season, because it was unsuccessful, even though it had 2 races in which it scored points, and a further 2 other races where it finished 1 place down from points. The drivers were Juan Manuel Fangio II and P. J. Jones. The Mk-V would be the first CART chassis developed by Eagle after being inactive after the 1986 CART Series. This new car, called the Mk-V would be a unique chassis, but would be structurally similar to the Reynard 94I. The CART would be almost completely untested before the season, and during the season would prove to be extremely bad in the corners.

=== Eagle 987 ===
The Eagle 987 was the second to last chassis built by All American Racers. The car was raced only by Eagle, and was driven by Vincenzo Sospiri and Alex Barron. The car was entirely unsuccessful, and would be replaced by the Eagle 997 for the 1999 CART Championship.

== IMSA GT ==
Gurney's team was contracted by Toyota in 1983 to enter the IMSA GT Championship with specially-modified Toyota Celicas.

In 1988, the team moved up to the GTP category with two chassis – a modified Toyota 88C Group C car and a team-designed Eagle HF89 purpose-built for IMSA competition.

AAR experienced its greatest success in GTP competition with the Eagle MkIII, introduced in 1991. Powered by a turbocharged 2.1-liter Toyota inline-4 developing up to 800 horsepower and generating 10,000 pounds of downforce at 200 mph, the MkIII won 21 of the 27 races in which it was entered – a record so dominant that it has been blamed for the collapse of the GTP series.

== Trans-Am ==
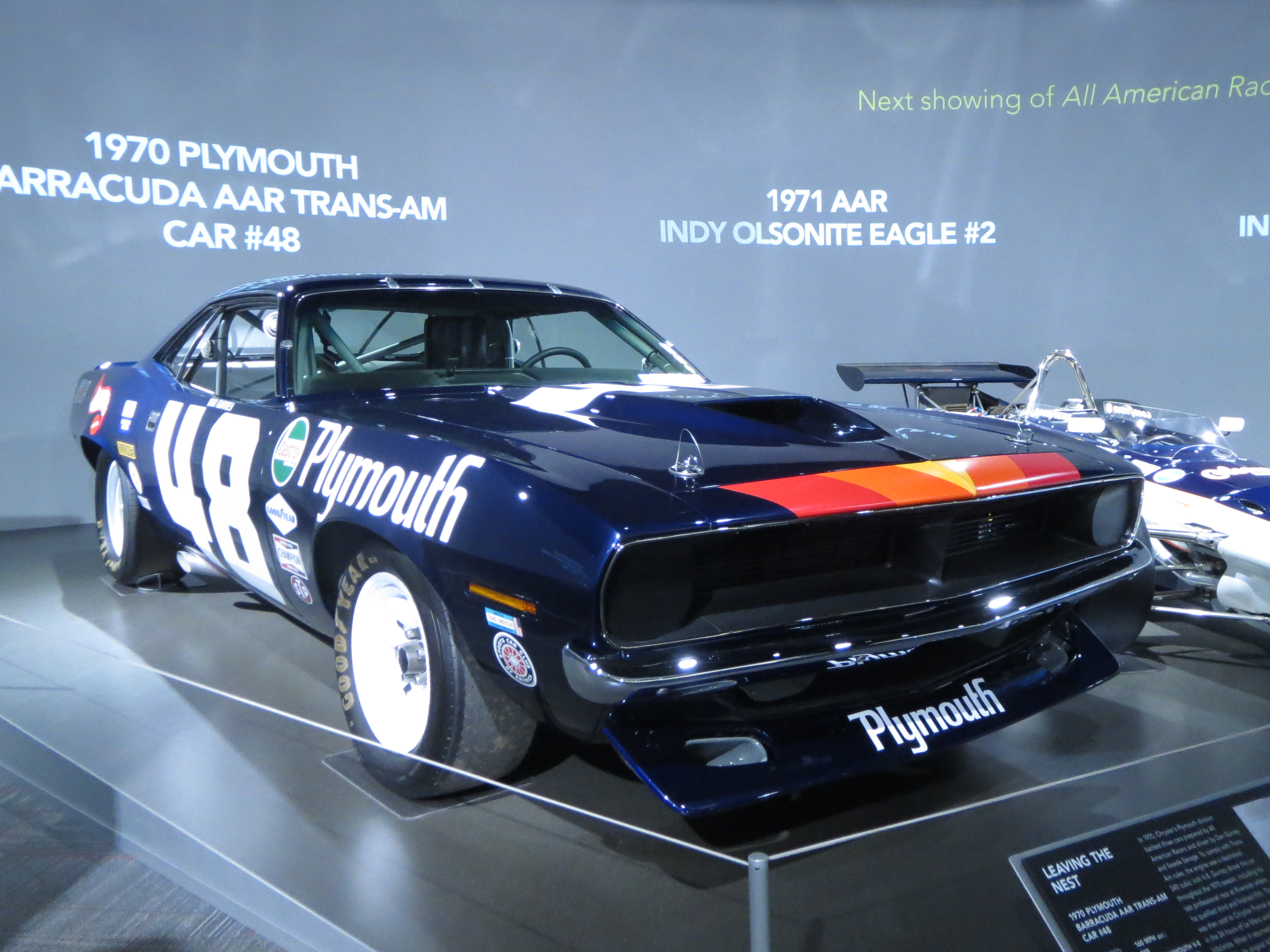
1970 Trans-Am AAR 'Cuda

AAR created a special Trans-Am Series version of the Plymouth Barracuda, running in the 1970 season with drivers Dan Gurney and Swede Savage. A homologation special production edition was offered in 1970.

== Racing results ==
=== Complete Formula One World Championship results ===
==== Anglo American Racers ====
(key)

Year	Chassis	Engine(s)	Tyres	Drivers	1	2	3	4	5	6	7	8	9	10	11	12	Points	WCC
1966	Eagle T1G	Climax S4; Weslake V12	G		MON	BEL	FRA	GBR	NED	GER	ITA	USA	MEX				4	7th
1966	Eagle T1G	Climax S4; Weslake V12	G	(United States) Dan Gurney		Ret	5	Ret	Ret	7	Ret	Ret	5				4	7th
1966	Eagle T1G	Climax S4; Weslake V12	G	(United States) Phil Hill							DNQ						4	7th
1966	Eagle T1G	Climax S4; Weslake V12	G	(United States) Bob Bondurant								DSQ	Ret				4	7th
1967	Eagle T1G	Weslake V12	G		RSA	MON	NED	BEL	FRA	GBR	GER	CAN	ITA	USA	MEX		13	7th
1967	Eagle T1G	Weslake V12	G	(United States) Dan Gurney	Ret	Ret	Ret	1^{F}	Ret	Ret	Ret^{F}	3	Ret	Ret	Ret		13	7th
1967	Eagle T1G	Weslake V12	G	(United States) Richie Ginther		DNQ											13	7th
1967	Eagle T1G	Weslake V12	G	(New Zealand) Bruce McLaren					Ret	Ret	Ret						13	7th
1967	Eagle T1G	Weslake V12	G	(Italy) Ludovico Scarfiotti									Ret				13	7th
1968			G		RSA	ESP	MON	BEL	NED	FRA	GBR	GER	ITA	CAN	USA	MEX	0*	12th
1968	Eagle T1G	Weslake V12	G	(United States) Dan Gurney	Ret		Ret	Ret			Ret	9	Ret				0*	12th
1968	McLaren M7A	Ford V8	G	(United States) Dan Gurney										Ret	4	Ret	—N/a (Note: Results scored in a McLaren-Ford did not count towards Eagle-Weslake's points total.)	

==== Non-works entries ====
(key)

Year	Entrant	Chassis	Engine	Tyres	Drivers	1	2	3	4	5	6	7	8	9	10	11	12
1967	Castrol Oils Ltd.	Eagle T1G	Climax S4	G		RSA	MON	NED	BEL	FRA	GBR	GER	CAN	ITA	USA	MEX	
1967	Castrol Oils Ltd.	Eagle T1G	Climax S4	G	(Canada) Al Pease								NC				
1968	Castrol Oils Ltd.	Eagle T1G	Climax S4	G		RSA	ESP	MON	BEL	NED	FRA	GBR	GER	ITA	CAN	USA	MEX
1968	Castrol Oils Ltd.	Eagle T1G	Climax S4	G	(Canada) Al Pease										DNS		
1969	John Maryon	Eagle T1G	Climax S4	F		RSA	ESP	MON	NED	FRA	GBR	GER	ITA	CAN	USA	MEX	
1969	John Maryon	Eagle T1G	Climax S4	F	(Canada) Al Pease									DSQ			

=== Complete Formula One Non-Championship results ===
(key)

Year	Chassis	Engine	Driver	1	2	3	4	5	6
1967	Eagle T1G	Weslake V12		ROC	SPC	INT	SYR	OUL	ESP
1967	Eagle T1G	Weslake V12	(United States) Dan Gurney	1					
1967	Eagle T1G	Weslake V12	(United States) Richie Ginther	10					

=== Complete CART PPG Indy Car World Series results ===
(key) (results in bold indicate pole position)

Year	Chassis	Engine	Tyres	Drivers	No.	1	2	3	4	5	6	7	8	9	10	11	12	13	14	15	16	17	18	19	20
1979						PHX	ATL		INDY	TRT		MCH		WGL	TRT	ONT	MCH	ATL	PHX						
1979	Eagle 79	Cosworth DFX V8 t	G	(United States) Mike Mosley	36	6	17	17	3	13	DNS	2	20	12	14	34		14	10						
1980						ONT	INDY	MIL	POC	MDO	MCH	WGL	MIL	ONT	MCH	MXC	PHX								
1980	Eagle 80	Cosworth DFX V8 t	G	(United States) Mike Mosley	48	19																			
1980	Eagle 80	Chevrolet V8	G	(United States) Mike Mosley	48		32		23					17											
1981						PHX	MIL	ATL		MCH	RIV	MIL	MCH	WGL	MXC	PHX									
1981	Eagle 81	Chevrolet V8	G	(United States) Mike Mosley	48		1*	DNS		18		DNS	26			24									
1981	Eagle 81	Chevrolet V8	G	(Australia) Geoff Brabham	48						**19**				9										
1981	Eagle 81	Chevrolet V8	G	(United States) Rocky Moran	48									6											
1983						ATL	INDY	MIL	CLE	MCH	ROA	POC	RIV	MDO	MCH	CPL	LAG	PHX							
1983	Eagle 83	Chevrolet V8	G	(United States) Jeff Wood	98											22	8								
1984						LBH	PHX	INDY	MIL	POR	MEA	CLE	MCH	ROA	POC	MDO	SAN	MCH	PHX	LAG	CPL				
1984	Eagle 84SB	Pontiac V8	G	(United States) Mike Chandler	88	16		DNQ																	
1984	Eagle 84SB	Pontiac V8	G	(United States) Kevin Cogan	88		8																		
1984	Eagle 84SB	Pontiac V8	G	(United States) Kevin Cogan	98			20	9	18	20	22													
1984	Eagle 84SB	Pontiac V8	G	(United States) Pete Halsmer	98								14												
1984	Eagle 84SB	Pontiac V8	G	(United States) Ed Pimm	98									26	13	22	22	19	10	12	19				
1985						LBH	INDY	MIL	POR	MEA	CLE	MCH	ROA	POC	MDO	SAN	MCH	LAG	PHX	MIA					
1985	Eagle 85GC	Cosworth DFX V8 t	G	(United States) Tom Sneva	2	8	20	2		6	11	3	21	8	15		5			21					
1985	Lola T900	Cosworth DFX V8 t	G	(United States) Tom Sneva	2				24							7		19	19						
1985	Lola T900	Cosworth DFX V8 t	G	(United States) Tony Bettenhausen Jr.	97		29																		
1985	Lola T900	Cosworth DFX V8 t	G	(United States) Ed Pimm	98			21																	
1985	Eagle 85GC	Cosworth DFX V8 t	G	(United States) Ed Pimm	98	12	9		19	DNS		5	11	20	9	8	3	14	9	12					
1986						PHX	LBH	INDY	MIL	POR	MEA	CLE	TOR	MCH	POC	MDO	SAN	MCH	ROA	LAG	PHX	MIA			
1986	Eagle 86GC	Cosworth DFX V8 t	G	(Netherlands) Jan Lammers	98	9	14	DNQ																	
1996						MIA	RIO	SFR	LBH	NAZ	500	MIL	DET	POR	CLE	TOR	MCH	MDO	ROA	VAN	LAG				
1996	Eagle MK-V	Toyota RV8A V8 t	G	(Argentina) Juan Manuel Fangio II	36	21	17	15	25	25	22	19	18	14	13	28	14	20	8	19	28				
1996	Eagle MK-V	Toyota RV8A V8 t	G	(United States) P. J. Jones	98						Wth	24	9	24	23	20	16	25	18	13	27				
1997						MIA	SFR	LBH	NAZ	RIO	GAT	MIL	DET	POR	CLE	TOR	MCH	MDO	ROA	VAN	LAG	FON			
1997	Reynard 96i	Toyota RV8A V8 t	G	(Argentina) Juan Manuel Fangio II	36	20	20	26	15																
1997	Reynard 97i	Toyota RV8B V8 t	G	(Argentina) Juan Manuel Fangio II	36					20	23	21	10	22	21	19	11	25	10	12	15	27			
1997	Reynard 96i	Toyota RV8A V8 t	G	(United States) P. J. Jones	98	28	26	16	21																
1997	Reynard 97i	Toyota RV8B V8 t	G	(United States) P. J. Jones	98					16	21	14	14	20	25	21	28	17	14	25	17	10			
1998						MIA	MOT	LBH	NAZ	RIO	GAT	MIL	DET	POR	CLE	TOR	MCH	MDO	ROA	VAN	LAG	HOU	SFR	FON	
1998	Reynard 97i Reynard 98i Eagle 987	Toyota RV8C V8 t Toyota RV8D V8 t	G	(United States) Alex Barron	36	18	24	14	DNS	12	14	DNS	20	14	15	28	15	16	24	19	20	12	19	13	
1998	Reynard 97i Reynard 98i Eagle 987	Toyota RV8C V8 t Toyota RV8D V8 t	G	(United States) P. J. Jones	98	20	30	11	19	13	12	14	25	16	21	19	24	20	22	21					
1998	Reynard 97i Reynard 98i Eagle 987	Toyota RV8C V8 t Toyota RV8D V8 t	G	(Italy) Vincenzo Sospiri	98																22	15	15	23	
1999						MIA	MOT	LBH	NAZ	RIO	GAT	MIL	POR	CLE	ROA	TOR	MCH	DET	MDO	CHI	VAN	LAG	HOU	SRF	FON
1999	Eagle 997	Toyota RV8D V8 t	G	(United States) Alex Barron	36	15	17	23	9	23	16	14													
1999	Eagle 997	Toyota RV8D V8 t	G	(Brazil) Gualter Salles	36								27	13	20	25	15	11	18						
1999	Eagle 997	Toyota RV8D V8 t	G	(Brazil) Raul Boesel	36															12					17
1999	Eagle 997	Toyota RV8D V8 t	G	(Italy) Andrea Montermini	36																11	24	23	15	
