= Al Pease =

British-Canadian racing driver (1921–2014)

- Born: Alan Victor Pease; 15 October 1921; Darlington, County Durham, England
- Died: 4 May 2014 (aged 92); Sevierville, Tennessee, U.S.

Formula One World Championship career
- Nationality: (Canada) Canadian
- Active years: 1967–1969
- Team: privateer Eagle
- Entries: 3 (2 starts)
- Championships: 0
- Wins: 0
- Podiums: 0
- Career points: 0
- Pole positions: 0
- Fastest laps: 0
- First entry: 1967 Canadian Grand Prix
- Last entry: 1969 Canadian Grand Prix

Alan Victor Pease (15 October 1921 – 4 May 2014) was a British-Canadian motor racing driver, who was born in Darlington, England. He holds the unusual accolade of being the only driver to be disqualified from a Formula One World Championship race due to being too slow.

== Biography ==
Growing up in England, he joined the British Army as a young man, serving in India, Rhodesia and Egypt. After his service, he emigrated to the United States, then Canada, in the 1960s; after a brief career as an illustrator, he took up motorsports.

Pease participated in three Formula One World Championship Grands Prix, debuting on 27 August 1967. He is the only competitor disqualified from a World Championship race, the 1969 Canadian Grand Prix, for being too slow. He was black-flagged after a series of on-track incidents, the last involving Matra driver Jackie Stewart. In response, Matra owner, Ken Tyrrell, protested to the officials and had Pease disqualified. At the time, he had completed 22 laps in an uncompetitive car while the leaders had finished 46. His Formula One career was limited to three Canadian Grands Prix, consisting of a non-classification (1967, finishing 43 laps behind the leaders), a failure to start (engine trouble in 1968), and a disqualification (1969).

Despite the brief duration of his Formula One career, Pease was highly successful in domestic Canadian motorsport competitions, winning a total of five regional championship and two national championship. He was later inducted as a member of the Canadian Motorsport Hall of Fame in 1998.

Pease died on 4 May 2014 at his home in Tennessee.

== Complete Formula One World Championship results ==
(key)

Year	Entrant	Chassis	Engine	1	2	3	4	5	6	7	8	9	10	11	12	WDC	Pts
1967	Castrol Oils Ltd.	Eagle Mk1	Climax Straight-4	RSA	MON	NED	BEL	FRA	GBR	GER	CAN; NC	ITA	USA	MEX		NC	0
1968	Castrol Oils Ltd.	Eagle Mk1	Climax Straight-4	RSA	ESP	MON	BEL	NED	FRA	GBR	GER	ITA	CAN; DNS	USA	MEX	NC	0
1969	John Maryon	Eagle Mk1	Climax Straight-4	RSA	ESP	MON	NED	FRA	GBR	GER	ITA	CAN; DSQ	USA	MEX		NC	0
