= 1968 Canadian Grand Prix =

1968 Canadian Formula One race held in Mont-Tremblant, Quebec

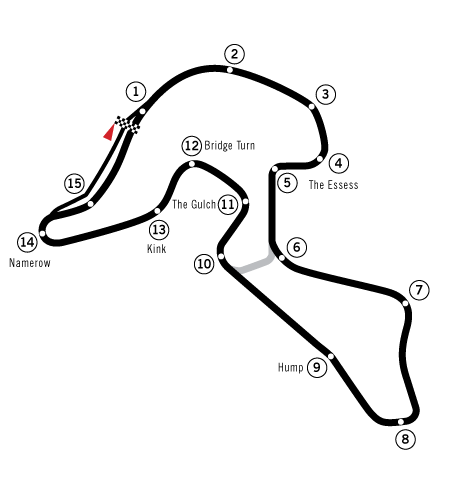

Race details
- Date: September 22, 1968
- Official name: VIII Player's Grand Prix
- Location: Circuit Mont-Tremblant, Mont-Tremblant, Quebec, Canada
- Course: Permanent racing facility
- Course length: 4.265 km (2.650 miles)
- Distance: 90 laps, 383.850 km (238.501 miles)
- Weather: Sunny with temperatures reaching up to 27.8 °C (82.0 °F) and wind speeds up to 10.1 kilometres per hour (6.3 mph); no precipitation reported throughout the day

Pole position
Driver	(Austria) Jochen Rindt	Brabham-Repco
- Time: 1:33.8

Fastest lap
Driver	(Switzerland) Jo Siffert	Lotus-Ford
- Time: 1:35.1 on lap 22

Podium
First	(New Zealand) Denny Hulme	McLaren-Ford
Second	(New Zealand) Bruce McLaren	McLaren-Ford
Third	(Mexico) Pedro Rodríguez	BRM

The 1968 Canadian Grand Prix was a Formula One motor race held at the Circuit Mont-Tremblant in St. Jovite, Quebec, Canada on September 22, 1968. It was race 10 of 12 in both the 1968 World Championship of Drivers and the 1968 International Cup for Formula One Manufacturers. The 90-lap race was won by McLaren driver Denny Hulme after starting from sixth position. Hulme's teammate Bruce McLaren finished second and BRM driver Pedro Rodríguez came in third.

After the success of the 1967 Canadian Grand Prix, the event was given a place on the 1968 calendar, but was moved from Mosport Park to the Circuit Mont-Tremblant. Attention centred on the battle for the Drivers' Championship, with Graham Hill leading on 30 points, closely followed by Jacky Ickx on 27, Jackie Stewart on 26 and defending champion Denny Hulme on 24.

== Report ==
=== Entry ===
A total of 22 cars were entered for this event, the first of three races in the Americas.

Dan Gurney was present in a third Bruce McLaren Motor Racing prepared McLaren M7A, although entered by his Anglo American Racers team, having given up on his Eagle-Weslake project. Despite this, there was an Eagle T1F in Quebec, in the hands of local Formula A/5000 driver, Al Pease. Another local driver from this series, Bill Brack, appeared in Team Lotus's third car. Meanwhile, BRM ran only one car for Pedro Rodríguez. Matra Sports expanded their operation to two cars, with Henri Pescarolo joining Jean-Pierre Beltoise, while Johnny Servoz-Gavin drove a second car prepared by Matra International, following his second place at the previous race in Italy. Alongside Jackie Stewart, this made four Matras in the field.

=== Qualifying ===
With his Repco-Brabham V8 engine finally beginning to work, Jochen Rindt secured pole position for the Brabham Racing Organisation in their Brabham-Repco BT26, with an average speed of 101.711 mph. He was joined on the front row by Chris Amon's Ferrari 312 and Jo Siffert in Rob Walker's Lotus 49B. The fastest McLaren was that of Dan Gurney, qualifying on the second row, alongside the works Lotus of Graham Hill, while the third row featured both of the Bruce McLaren Motor Racing entered McLaren M7As of Denny Hulme and Bruce McLaren, sandwiching the sole Honda RA301 of John Surtees.

During qualifying, Jacky Ickx's hopes of winning the World title ended when he crashed his Ferrari 312, after the throttle stuck open. As a result, Ickx suffered a broken leg.

=== Race ===
The race was held over 90 laps of the Circuit Mont-Tremblant, taking place in sunny conditions, with the Ferrari of Chris Amon leading straight from the off, with Jo Siffert chasing him. Then followed Jochen Rindt, Dan Gurney and Graham Hill. The positions at the front remained stable, with John Surtees retiring from eighth place with gearbox troubles. On lap 14, Hill managed pass Gurney, and 12 laps later, the American dropped away with a broken radiator. An oil leak accounted for Siffert, on lap 29, and so Rindt was second, although he too retired shortly afterwards with an engine failure. This promoted Hill to second. That too was short-lived, as he soon dropped behind the McLarens of Denny Hulme and Bruce McLaren because of a serious vibration issues. As Hill's Lotus 49B gradually fell back, he was overtaken by Pedro Rodríguez and Johnny Servoz-Gavin. A few laps later (lap 71), the Matra of Servoz-Gavin had spun out and Hill was back up to fifth.

While all this was going on, Amon seemed to have everything under control for the first 72 laps of the race, however, on the 73rd lap, his legendary bad luck struck when his Ferrari's transmission failed. This gave McLaren a 1-2 victory with Rodríguez grabbing third for BRM. Hulme won in a time of 2hr 27.11.2mins., averaging a speed of 97.799 mph, and was a full lap ahead of his team-mate.

The result put reigning World Champion Hulme level on points with Hill, with two races remaining.

== Classification ==
=== Qualifying ===
Pos	No	Driver	Constructor	Time	Gap
1	6	(Austria) Jochen Rindt	Brabham-Repco	1:33.8	—
2	9	(New Zealand) Chris Amon	Ferrari	1:33.8	+0.0
3	12	(Switzerland) Jo Siffert	Lotus-Ford	1:34.5	+0.7
4	11	(United States) Dan Gurney	McLaren-Ford	1:34.5	+0.7
5	3	(United Kingdom) Graham Hill	Lotus-Ford	1:34.8	+1.0
6	1	(New Zealand) Denny Hulme	McLaren-Ford	1:34.9	+1.1
7	8	(United Kingdom) John Surtees	Honda	1:34.9	+1.1
8	2	(New Zealand) Bruce McLaren	McLaren-Ford	1:35.0	+1.2
9	4	(United Kingdom) Jackie Oliver	Lotus-Ford	1:35.2	+1.4
10	5	(Australia) Jack Brabham	Brabham-Repco	1:35.4	+1.6
11	14	(United Kingdom) Jackie Stewart	Matra-Ford	1:35.4	+1.6
12	16	(Mexico) Pedro Rodríguez	BRM	1:35.7	+1.9
13	15	(France) Johnny Servoz-Gavin	Matra-Ford	1:36.6	+2.8
14	10	(Belgium) Jacky Ickx	Ferrari	1:36.6	+2.8
15	24	(United Kingdom) Piers Courage	BRM	1:37.3	+3.5
16	18	(France) Jean-Pierre Beltoise	Matra	1:38.7	+4.9
17	21	(United Kingdom) Vic Elford	Cooper-BRM	1:39.4	+5.6
18	22	(Sweden) Jo Bonnier	McLaren-BRM	1:39.6	+5.8
19	20	(Belgium) Lucien Bianchi	Cooper-BRM	1:40.5	+6.7
20	19	(France) Henri Pescarolo	Matra	1:41.2	+7.4
21	27	(Canada) Bill Brack	Lotus-Ford	1:41.2	+7.4
22	25	(Canada) Al Pease	Eagle-Climax	1:49.6	+15.8

=== Race ===
Pos	No	Driver	Constructor	Laps	Time/Retired	Grid	Points
1	1	(New Zealand) Denny Hulme	McLaren-Ford	90	2:27:11.2	6	9
2	2	(New Zealand) Bruce McLaren	McLaren-Ford	89	+ 1 Lap	8	6
3	16	(Mexico) Pedro Rodríguez	BRM	88	+ 2 Laps	12	4
4	3	(United Kingdom) Graham Hill	Lotus-Ford	86	+ 4 Laps	5	3
5	21	(United Kingdom) Vic Elford	Cooper-BRM	86	+ 4 Laps	16	2
6	14	(United Kingdom) Jackie Stewart	Matra-Ford	83	+ 7 Laps	11	1
Ret	18	(France) Jean-Pierre Beltoise	Matra	77	Gearbox	15	
Ret	9	(New Zealand) Chris Amon	Ferrari	72	Transmission	2	
Ret	15	(France) Johnny Servoz-Gavin	Matra-Ford	71	Accident	13	
NC	20	(Belgium) Lucien Bianchi	Cooper-BRM	56	+ 34 Laps	18	
Ret	19	(France) Henri Pescarolo	Matra	54	Oil pressure	19	
Ret	6	(Austria) Jochen Rindt	Brabham-Repco	39	Overheating	1	
Ret	4	(United Kingdom) Jackie Oliver	Lotus-Ford	32	Halfshaft	9	
Ret	5	(Australia) Jack Brabham	Brabham-Repco	31	Suspension	10	
Ret	12	(Switzerland) Jo Siffert	Lotus-Ford	29	Oil leak	3	
Ret	11	(United States) Dan Gurney	McLaren-Ford	29	Radiator	4	
Ret	24	(United Kingdom) Piers Courage	BRM	22	Gearbox	14	
Ret	27	(Canada) Bill Brack	Lotus-Ford	18	Halfshaft	20	
Ret	8	(United Kingdom) John Surtees	Honda	10	Gearbox	7	
Ret	22	(Sweden) Jo Bonnier	McLaren-BRM	0	Fuel system	17	
DNS	10	(Belgium) Jacky Ickx	Ferrari		Practice accident/Injury		
DNS	25	(Canada) Al Pease	Eagle-Climax		Engine		

== Notes ==
- This was the Formula One World Championship debut for Canadian driver Bill Brack and French driver and future Le Mans winner Henri Pescarolo.

== Championship standings after the race ==
Drivers' Championship standings

	Pos	Driver	Points
	1	(United Kingdom) Graham Hill	33
2	2	(New Zealand) Denny Hulme	33
	3	(United Kingdom) Jackie Stewart	27
2	4	(Belgium) Jacky Ickx	27
4	5	(New Zealand) Bruce McLaren	15

Constructors' Championship standings

	Pos	Constructor	Points
	1	(United Kingdom) Lotus-Ford	47
2	2	(United Kingdom) McLaren-Ford	40
1	3	(France) Matra-Ford	36
1	4	(Italy) Ferrari	32
	5	(United Kingdom) BRM	25

- Note: Only the top five positions are included for both sets of standings.

Previous race: 1968 Italian Grand Prix	FIA Formula One World Championship; 1968 season	Next race: 1968 United States Grand Prix
Previous race: 1967 Canadian Grand Prix	Canadian Grand Prix	Next race: 1969 Canadian Grand Prix
