= 1969 Canadian Grand Prix =

1969 Canadian Formula One race held in Bowmanville, Ontario

Race details
- Date: 20 September 1969
- Official name: IX Player's Grand Prix of Canada
- Location: Mosport International Raceway, Ontario, Canada
- Course: Permanent racing facility
- Course length: 3.957 km (2.458 miles)
- Distance: 90 laps, 356.13 km (221.22 miles)
- Weather: Mild with temperatures approaching 21.1 °C (70.0 °F); wind speeds up to 10.1 kilometres per hour (6.3 mph)

Pole position
Driver	(Belgium) Jacky Ickx	Brabham-Ford
- Time: 1:17.4

Fastest lap
Drivers	(Belgium) Jacky Ickx (lap 30)	Brabham-Ford
	(Australia) Jack Brabham (lap 62)	Brabham-Ford
- Time: 1:18.1

Podium
First	(Belgium) Jacky Ickx	Brabham-Ford
Second	(Australia) Jack Brabham	Brabham-Ford
Third	(Austria) Jochen Rindt	Lotus-Ford

The 1969 Canadian Grand Prix was a Formula One motor race held at Mosport Park on September 20, 1969. It was race 9 of 11 in both the 1969 World Championship of Drivers and the 1969 International Cup for Formula One Manufacturers. The 90-lap race was won from pole position by Belgian driver Jacky Ickx in a works Brabham-Ford, with teammate Jack Brabham second and Jochen Rindt third in a works Lotus-Ford.

The race was the last World Championship Grand Prix in which Climax-powered cars were entered. One of the entrants, Al Pease, in an Eagle-Climax, became the only driver in F1 history to be disqualified for driving too slowly. The other entrant, John Cordts in a Brabham-Climax, retired after only ten laps.

By finishing sixth, Johnny Servoz-Gavin became the first and only driver in Formula One history to score points in a four-wheel drive car, as of 2026.

== Classification ==
=== Qualifying ===
Pos	No	Driver	Constructor	Time	Gap
1	11	(Belgium) Jacky Ickx	Brabham-Ford	1:17.4	—
2	18	(France) Jean-Pierre Beltoise	Matra-Ford	1:17.9	+0.5
3	2	(Austria) Jochen Rindt	Lotus-Ford	1:17.9	+0.5
4	17	(United Kingdom) Jackie Stewart	Matra-Ford	1:17.9	+0.5
5	5	(New Zealand) Denny Hulme	McLaren-Ford	1:18.0	+0.6
6	12	(Australia) Jack Brabham	Brabham-Ford	1:18.0	+0.6
7	1	(United Kingdom) Graham Hill	Lotus-Ford	1:18.3	+0.9
8	9	(Switzerland) Jo Siffert	Lotus-Ford	1:18.5	+1.1
9	4	(New Zealand) Bruce McLaren	McLaren-Ford	1:18.5	+1.1
10	21	(United Kingdom) Piers Courage	Brabham-Ford	1:19.5	+2.1
11	3	(United Kingdom) John Miles	Lotus-Ford	1:20.0	+2.6
12	15	(United Kingdom) Jackie Oliver	BRM	1:20.2	+2.8
13	6	(Mexico) Pedro Rodríguez	Ferrari	1:20.5	+3.1
14	14	(United Kingdom) John Surtees	BRM	1:20.6	+3.2
15	19	(France) Johnny Servoz-Gavin	Matra-Ford	1:21.4	+4.0
16	25	(United States) Pete Lovely	Lotus-Ford	1:22.9	+5.5
17	69	(Canada) Al Pease	Eagle-Climax	1:28.5	+11.1
18	16	(Canada) Bill Brack	BRM	1:28.7	+11.3
19	26	(Canada) John Cordts	Brabham-Climax	1:29.7	+12.3
20	20	(Switzerland) Silvio Moser	Brabham-Ford	1:41.4	+24.0

=== Race ===
Pos	No	Driver	Constructor	Laps	Time/Retired	Grid	Points
1	11	(Belgium) Jacky Ickx	Brabham-Ford	90	1:59:25.7	1	9
2	12	(Australia) Jack Brabham	Brabham-Ford	90	+ 46.2	6	6
3	2	(Austria) Jochen Rindt	Lotus-Ford	90	+ 52.0	3	4
4	18	(France) Jean-Pierre Beltoise	Matra-Ford	89	+ 1 Lap	2	3
5	4	(New Zealand) Bruce McLaren	McLaren-Ford	87	+ 3 Laps	9	2
6	19	(France) Johnny Servoz-Gavin	Matra-Ford	84	+ 6 Laps	15	1
7	25	(United States) Pete Lovely	Lotus-Ford	81	+ 9 Laps	16	
NC	16	(Canada) Bill Brack	BRM	80	+ 10 Laps	18	
Ret	1	(United Kingdom) Graham Hill	Lotus-Ford	42	Engine	7	
Ret	9	(Switzerland) Jo Siffert	Lotus-Ford	40	Halfshaft	8	
Ret	3	(United Kingdom) John Miles	Lotus-Ford	40	Gearbox	11	
Ret	6	(Mexico) Pedro Rodríguez	Ferrari	37	Oil Pressure	13	
Ret	17	(United Kingdom) Jackie Stewart	Matra-Ford	32	Collision	4	
DSQ	69	(Canada) Al Pease	Eagle-Climax	22	Driving Too Slowly	17	
Ret	14	(United Kingdom) John Surtees	BRM	15	Engine	14	
Ret	21	(United Kingdom) Piers Courage	Brabham-Ford	13	Fuel Leak	10	
Ret	26	(Canada) John Cordts	Brabham-Climax	10	Oil Leak	19	
Ret	5	(New Zealand) Denny Hulme	McLaren-Ford	9	Distributor	5	
Ret	15	(United Kingdom) Jackie Oliver	BRM	2	Engine	12	
Ret	20	(Switzerland) Silvio Moser	Brabham-Ford	0	Accident	20	

== Notes ==
- This was the Formula One World Championship debut for Canadian driver John Cordts.
- This was the 50th, 51st and 52nd podium finish for a Ford-powered car. It was also the 5th Grand Slam for a Ford-powered car.

== Championship standings after the race ==
- **Bold text** indicates the World Champions.

Drivers' Championship standings

	Pos	Driver	Points
	1	(United Kingdom) **Jackie Stewart**	60
1	2	(Belgium) Jacky Ickx	31
1	3	(New Zealand) Bruce McLaren	26
	4	(United Kingdom) Graham Hill	19
	5	(France) Jean-Pierre Beltoise	19

Constructors' Championship standings

	Pos	Constructor	Points
	1	(France) **Matra-Ford**	63
1	2	(United Kingdom) Brabham-Ford	39
1	3	(United Kingdom) Lotus-Ford	38
	4	(United Kingdom) McLaren-Ford	29 (31)
	5	(Italy) Ferrari	5

- Note: Only the top five positions are included for both sets of standings. Only the best 5 results from the first 6 rounds and the best 4 results from the last 5 rounds counted towards the Championship. Numbers without parentheses are Championship points; numbers in parentheses are total points scored.

Previous race: 1969 Italian Grand Prix	FIA Formula One World Championship; 1969 season	Next race: 1969 United States Grand Prix
Previous race: 1968 Canadian Grand Prix	Canadian Grand Prix	Next race: 1970 Canadian Grand Prix
