= 1969 Pau Grand Prix =

Race details
- Date: 20 April 1969
- Official name: XXIX Pau Grand Prix
- Location: Pau, France
- Course: Temporary Street Circuit
- Course length: 2.760 km (1.720 miles)
- Distance: 70 laps, 193.200 km (120.048 miles)

Pole position
Driver	(Austria) Jochen Rindt	Lotus-Cosworth
- Time: 1:18.4

Fastest lap
Driver	(Austria) Jochen Rindt	Lotus-Cosworth
- Time: 1:18.9

Podium
First	(Austria) Jochen Rindt	Lotus-Cosworth
Second	(France) Jean-Pierre Beltoise	Matra-Cosworth
Third	(United Kingdom) Piers Courage	Brabham-Cosworth

The 1969 Pau Grand Prix was a Formula Two motor race held on 20 April 1969 at the Pau circuit, in Pau, Pyrénées-Atlantiques, France. The Grand Prix was won by Jochen Rindt, driving the Lotus 59B. Jean-Pierre Beltoise finished second and Piers Courage third.

== Classification ==
=== Race ===
Pos	No	Driver	Vehicle	Laps	Time/Retired	Grid
1	4	(Austria) Jochen Rindt	Lotus-Cosworth	70	1hr 34min 09.7sec	1
2	10	(France) Jean-Pierre Beltoise	Matra-Cosworth	70	+ 1:01.4 s	
3	28	(United Kingdom) Piers Courage	Brabham-Cosworth	70	+ 1:09.3 s	
4	8	(France) Johnny Servoz-Gavin	Matra-Cosworth	69	+ 1 lap	
5	14	(France) François Cevert	Tecno-Cosworth	68	+ 2 laps	
6	32	(Italy) Enzo Corti	Brabham-Cosworth	65	+ 5 laps	
7	16	(Italy) Nanni Galli	Tecno-Cosworth	63	+ 7 laps	
8	26	(United Kingdom) Robin Widdows	Merlyn-Cosworth	56	+ 14 laps	
Ret	6	(United Kingdom) Jackie Stewart	Matra-Cosworth	45	Drive shaft	
Ret	18	(France) Eric Offenstadt	Pygmée-Cosworth	43	Gearbox	
Ret	30	(United Kingdom) Bill Ivy	Brabham-Cosworth	24	Throttle	
Ret	2	(United Kingdom) Graham Hill	Lotus-Cosworth	17	Fuel metering belt	
Ret	22	(United Kingdom) Peter Westbury	Brabham-Cosworth	13	Gearbox	
Ret	20	(France) Patrick Dal Bo	Pygmée-Cosworth	5	Accident	
DNA	12	(France) Henri Pescarolo	Matra-Cosworth		Did Not Attend	
DNA	24	(United Kingdom) Peter Gethin	Brabham-Cosworth		Did Not Attend	
DNA	34	(United Kingdom) Graham Birrell	Brabham-Cosworth		Did Not Attend	
Fastest Lap: Jochen Rindt (Lotus-Cosworth) - 1:18.9

Preceded by 1968 Pau Grand Prix	Pau Grand Prix; 1969	Succeeded by 1970 Pau Grand Prix
