= 1967 Pau Grand Prix =

Race details
- Date: 4 April 1967
- Official name: XXVII Pau Grand Prix
- Location: Pau, France
- Course: Temporary Street Circuit
- Course length: 2.760 km (1.720 miles)
- Distance: 70 laps, 193.200 km (120.048 miles)

Pole position
Driver	(United Kingdom) Jim Clark	Lotus-Cosworth
- Time: 1:20.8

Fastest lap
Driver	(United Kingdom) Jim Clark	Lotus-Cosworth
- Time: 1:20.4

Podium
First	(Austria) Jochen Rindt	Braham-Cosworth
Second	(New Zealand) Denny Hulme	Braham-Cosworth
Third	(United Kingdom) Alan Rees	Braham-Cosworth

The 1967 Pau Grand Prix was a Formula Two motor race held on 4 April 1967 at the Pau circuit, in Pau, Pyrénées-Atlantiques, France. The Grand Prix was won by Jochen Rindt, driving the Brabham BT23. Denny Hulme finished second and Alan Rees third.

== Classification ==
=== Race ===
Pos	No	Driver	Vehicle	Laps	Time/Retired	Grid
1	26	(Austria) Jochen Rindt	Braham-Cosworth	70	1hr 35min 55.9sec	
2	4	(New Zealand) Denny Hulme	Braham-Cosworth	70	+ 1:16.0 s	
3	28	(United Kingdom) Alan Rees	Braham-Cosworth	69	+ 1 lap	
4	6	(United Kingdom) Jim Clark	Lotus-Cosworth	69	+ 1 lap	1
5	22	(Belgium) Jacky Ickx	Matra-Cosworth	66	+ 4 laps	
6	18	(France) Johnny Servoz-Gavin	Matra-Cosworth	65	+ 5 laps	
7	10	(United Kingdom) Jackie Oliver	Lotus-Cosworth	60	+ 10 laps	
Ret	2	(Australia) Jack Brabham	Brabham-Cosworth	68	Oil pressure	
Ret	20	(United Kingdom) Jackie Stewart	Matra-Cosworth	37	Clutch	
Ret	36	(United Kingdom) Robin Widdows	Brabham-Cosworth	37	Fuel meter	
Ret	8	(United Kingdom) Graham Hill	Lotus-Cosworth	24	Gearbox	
Ret	16	(France) Jean-Pierre Beltoise	Matra-Cosworth	20	Clutch	
DNS	24	(France) Jo Schlesser	Lola-Lotus		Did Not Start	
DNS	30	(United Kingdom) Piers Courage	McLaren-Cosworth		Did Not Start	
DNS	38	(United Kingdom) Robert Lamplough	Lola-Lotus		Did Not Start	
Fastest Lap: Jim Clark (Brabham-Cosworth) - 1:20.4

Preceded by 1966 Pau Grand Prix	Pau Grand Prix; 1967	Succeeded by 1968 Pau Grand Prix
