= 1970 Pau Grand Prix =

Race details
- Date: 5 April 1970
- Official name: XXX Pau Grand Prix
- Location: Pau, France
- Course: Temporary Street Circuit
- Course length: 2.760 km (1.720 miles)
- Distance: 70 laps, 193.200 km (120.048 miles)

Pole position
Driver	(Austria) Jochen Rindt	Lotus-Cosworth
- Time: 1:17.7

Fastest lap
Driver	(Austria) Jochen Rindt (Australia) Jack Brabham	Lotus-Cosworth; Brabham-Cosworth
- Time: 1:19.5

Podium
First	(Austria) Jochen Rindt	Lotus-Cosworth
Second	(France) Henri Pescarolo	Brabham-Cosworth
Third	(Australia) Tim Schenken	Brabham-Cosworth

The 1970 Pau Grand Prix was a Formula Two motor race held on 5 April 1970 at the Pau circuit, in Pau, Pyrénées-Atlantiques, France. The Grand Prix was won by Jochen Rindt, driving the Lotus 69. Henri Pescarolo finished second and Tim Schenken third.

== Classification ==
=== Race ===
Pos	No	Driver	Vehicle	Laps	Time/Retired	Grid
1	4	(Austria) Jochen Rindt	Lotus-Cosworth	70	1hr 33min 37.6sec	1
2	34	(France) Henri Pescarolo	Brabham-Cosworth	70	+ 1:54.1 s	4
3	16	(Australia) Tim Schenken	Brabham-Cosworth	70	+ 2:28.2 s	8
4	28	(United Kingdom) Derek Bell	Brabham-Cosworth	69	+ 1 lap	6
5	14	(France) François Mazet	Brabham-Cosworth	69	+ 1 lap	2
6	8	(France) François Cevert	Tecno-Cosworth	68	+ 2 laps	9
7	26	(France) Jean-Pierre Jabouille	Pygmée-Cosworth	67	+ 3 laps	10
8	32	(Japan) Tetsu Ikuzawa	Lotus-Cosworth	66	+ 4 laps	11
9	24	(France) Patrick Dal Bo	Pygmée-Cosworth	65	+ 5 laps	14
Ret	10	(Switzerland) Clay Regazzoni	Tecno-Cosworth	45	Accident	5
Ret	6	(France) Jean-Pierre Beltoise	Pygmée-Cosworth	26	Oil pipe	12
Ret	4	(United Kingdom) John Miles	Lotus-Cosworth	25	Accident	13
Ret	18	(Australia) Jack Brabham	Brabham-Cosworth	20	Fuel metering unit	3
Ret	30	(United Kingdom) Peter Westbury	Brabham-Cosworth	19	Accident	7
DNA	12	(France) Johnny Servoz-Gavin	Tecno-Cosworth		Did Not Attend	
DNA	20	(Switzerland) Jo Siffert	BMW		Did Not Attend	
DNA	22	(Brazil) Emerson Fittipaldi	Lotus-Cosworth		Did Not Attend	
DNA	36	(Sweden) Reine Wisell	Chevron-Cosworth		Did Not Attend	
DNA	18	(United Kingdom) Jackie Stewart	Brabham-Cosworth		Did Not Attend	
DNA	20	(Italy) Ernesto Brambilla	Ferrari		Did Not Attend	
Fastest Lap: Jochen Rindt (Lotus-Cosworth) & Jack Brabham (Brabham-Cosworth) - 1:19.5

Preceded by 1969 Pau Grand Prix	Pau Grand Prix; 1970	Succeeded by 1971 Pau Grand Prix
