= 1968 Pau Grand Prix =

Race details
- Date: 21 April 1968
- Official name: XXVIII Pau Grand Prix
- Location: Pau, France
- Course: Temporary Street Circuit
- Course length: 2.760 km (1.720 miles)
- Distance: 70 laps, 193.200 km (120.048 miles)

Pole position
Driver	(Austria) Jochen Rindt	Braham-Cosworth
- Time: 1:20.5

Fastest lap
Driver	(United Kingdom) Jackie Stewart	Matra-Cosworth
- Time: 1:20.1

Podium
First	(United Kingdom) Jackie Stewart	Matra-Cosworth
Second	(United Kingdom) Robin Widdows	McLaren-Cosworth
Third	(France) Jean-Pierre Beltoise	Matra-Cosworth

The 1968 Pau Grand Prix was a Formula Two motor race held on 21 April 1968 at the Pau circuit, in Pau, Pyrénées-Atlantiques, France. The Grand Prix was won by Jackie Stewart, driving the Matra MS7. Robin Widdows finished second and Jean-Pierre Beltoise third.

== Classification ==
=== Race ===
Pos	No	Driver	Vehicle	Laps	Time/Retired	Grid
1	8	(United Kingdom) Jackie Stewart	Matra-Cosworth	70	1hr 36min 08.0sec	3
2	14	(United Kingdom) Robin Widdows	McLaren-Cosworth	69	+ 1 lap	6
3	10	(France) Jean-Pierre Beltoise	Matra-Cosworth	69	+ 1 lap	2
4	22	(United Kingdom) Peter Gethin	Chevron-Cosworth	68	+ 2 laps	12
5	20	(France) Guy Ligier	McLaren-Cosworth	67	+ 3 laps	11
6	28	(Switzerland) Clay Regazzoni	Tecno-Cosworth	66	+ 4 laps	7
7	30	(Spain) Alex Soler-Roig	Lola-Cosworth	66	+ 4 laps	9
8	24	(United Kingdom) Chris Williams	Lola-Cosworth	66	+ 4 laps	10
9	16	(New Zealand) Graeme Lawrence	McLaren-Cosworth	65	+ 5 laps	14
Ret	18	(France) Jo Schlesser	McLaren-Cosworth	45	Accident	4
Ret	6	(United Kingdom) Alan Rees	Brabham-Cosworth	27	Accident	8
Ret	12	(France) Henri Pescarolo	Matra-Cosworth	27	Accident	5
Ret	4	(Austria) Jochen Rindt	Brabham-Cosworth	21	Accident	1
Ret	32	(Spain) Jorge de Bagration	Lola-Cosworth	16	Fuel injection	13
Fastest Lap: Jackie Stewart (Matra-Cosworth) - 1:20.1

Preceded by 1967 Pau Grand Prix	Pau Grand Prix; 1968	Succeeded by 1969 Pau Grand Prix
