= 1971 Pau Grand Prix =

Race details
- Date: 25 April 1971
- Official name: XXXI Pau Grand Prix
- Location: Pau, France
- Course: Temporary Street Circuit
- Course length: 2.760 km (1.720 miles)
- Distance: 70 laps, 193.200 km (120.048 miles)
- Weather: Sunny

Pole position
Driver	(France) François Cevert	Tecno-Cosworth
- Time: 1:23.4

Fastest lap
Driver	(France) François Cevert	Tecno-Cosworth
- Time: 1:18.2

Podium
First	(Sweden) Reine Wisell	Lotus-Cosworth
Second	(France) Jean-Pierre Jabouille	Tecno-Ford
Third	(France) Jean-Pierre Jaussaud	March-Cosworth

The 1971 Pau Grand Prix was a Formula Two motor race held on 25 April 1971 at the Pau circuit, in Pau, Pyrénées-Atlantiques, France. The Grand Prix was won by Reine Wisell, driving the Lotus 69C. Jean-Pierre Jabouille finished second and Jean-Pierre Jaussaud third.

== Classification ==
=== Race ===
Pos	No	Driver	Vehicle	Laps	Time/retired	Grid
1	18	(Sweden) Reine Wisell	Lotus-Cosworth	70	1hr 33min 23.7sec	
2	12	(France) Jean-Pierre Jabouille	Tecno-Ford	70	+ 16.7 s	
3	22	(France) Jean-Pierre Jaussaud	March-Cosworth	70	+ 30.6 s	
4	24	(France) François Mazet	Chevron-Cosworth	70	+ 1:02.2 s	
5	36	(France) Jean-Pierre Jarier	March-Cosworth	69	+ 1 lap	
6	10	(France) Patrick Depailler	Tecno-Cosworth	69	+ 1 lap	
7	28	(Argentina) Carlos Reutemann	Brabham-Cosworth	68	+ 2 laps	
8	4	(Australia) Tim Schenken	Brabham-Cosworth	68	+ 2 laps	
9	6	(France) Jean-Pierre Beltoise	March-Cosworth	67	+ 3 laps	
Ret	2	(United Kingdom) Graham Hill	Brabham-Cosworth	60	Water pump	
Ret	32	(France) Max Jean	March-Cosworth	49	Engine	
Ret	14	(Brazil) Emerson Fittipaldi	Lotus-Cosworth	34	Rear upright	
Ret	30	(Italy) Vittorio Brambilla	Brabham-Cosworth	24	Accident	
Ret	26	(United Kingdom) Graham Birrell	Lotus-Cosworth	12	Accident	
Ret	8	(France) François Cevert	Tecno-Cosworth	10	Engine	1
DNS	38	(United Kingdom) Alistair Walker	Brabham-Cosworth		Did not start	
DNQ	16	(Brazil) Wilson Fittipaldi	Lotus-Cosworth		Did not qualify	
DNA	34	(France) Patrick Dal Bo	Pygmée-Cosworth		Did Not Attend	
DNA	30	(Italy) Ernesto Brambilla	Brabham BT30-Cosworth		Did Not Attend	
Fastest Lap: François Cevert (Tecno-Cosworth) - 1:18.2

Preceded by 1970 Pau Grand Prix	Pau Grand Prix; 1971	Succeeded by 1972 Pau Grand Prix
