= M4A =

M4A may refer to:

- .m4a, an MPEG 4 filename extension for MPEG-4 Audio.
- McLaren M4A, a Formula Two racing car
- Medicare for All, common designation of single-payer healthcare proposals in the U.S.
