= Matra MS7 =

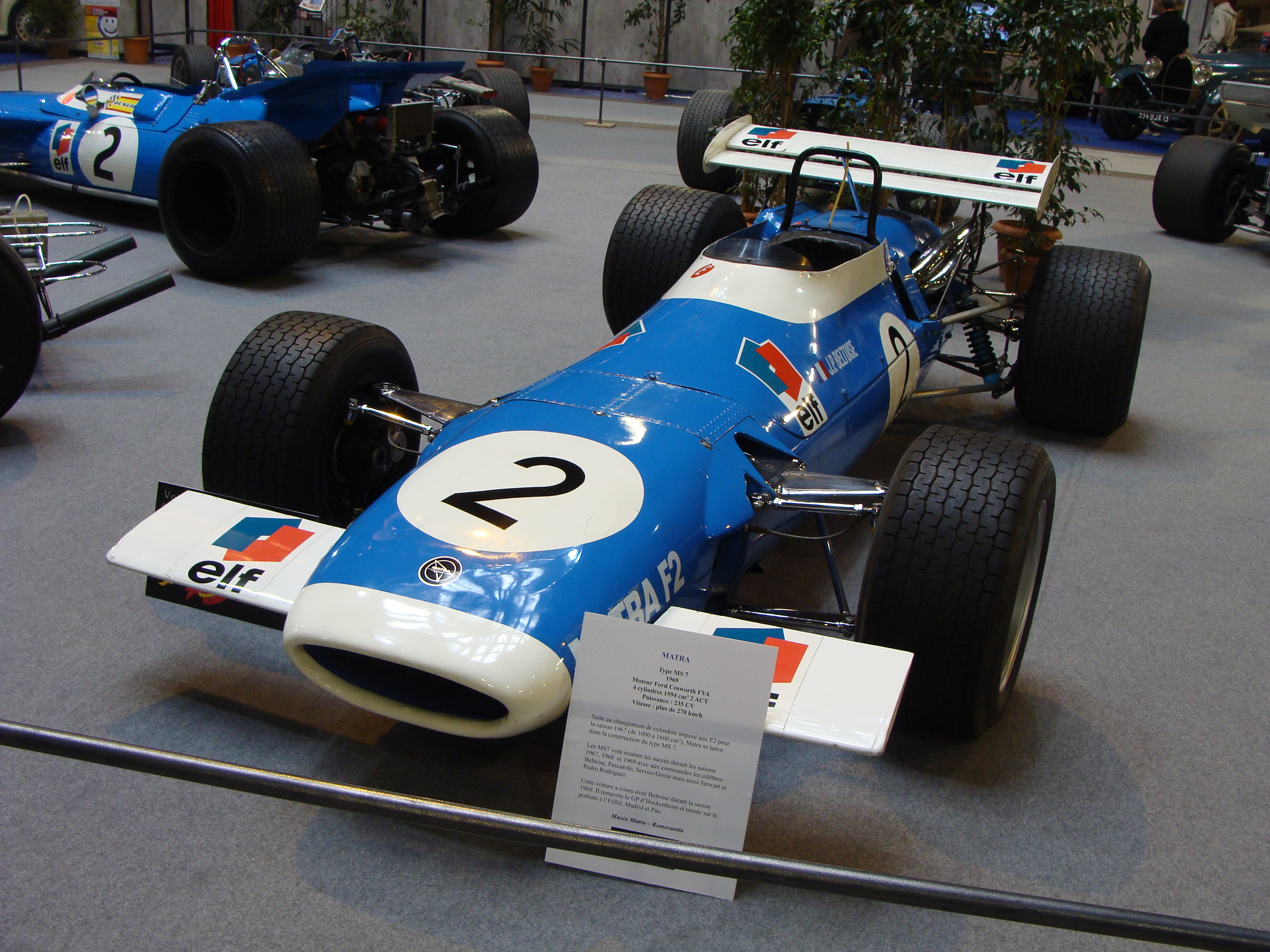
- Category: Formula One; Formula Two
- Constructor: Matra
- Designer: Bernard Boyer
- Predecessor: MS5
- Successor: MS9 / MS11

Technical specifications
- Chassis: Aluminium monocoque
- Engine: Ford Cosworth FVA L4 1,598 cc (97.5 cu in)
- Transmission: Hewland FG 200 5-speed manual gearbox
- Weight: 500 kg (1,100 lb)
- Fuel: Elf
- Tyres: Dunlop, Goodyear

Competition history
- Notable entrants: Matra, Tyrrell Racing
- Notable drivers: (Belgium) Jacky Ickx (France) Jean-Pierre Beltoise (France) Johnny Servoz-Gavin
- Debut: 1967 United States Grand Prix
Races	Wins	Podiums	Poles	F/Laps
4	0	0	0	0
- Unless otherwise stated, all data refer to Formula One World Championship Grands Prix only.

The Matra MS7 was a Formula Two racing car built by Matra, which occasionally raced in Formula One as well between 1967 and 1969.

While only modestly successful in Formula One, the car dominated Formula Two from late 1967 through 1969. Jacky Ickx, Jean-Pierre Beltoise and Johnny Servoz-Gavin won the European Championship in those years respectively, all driving the MS7 at least at some races.

== Complete Formula One World Championship results ==
(key) (results in bold indicate pole position; results in italics indicate fastest lap)

Year	Entrant	Engine	Tyres	Driver	1	2	3	4	5	6	7	8	9	10	11	12	Points^{†}	WCC^{†}
1967	Matra Sports	Ford Cosworth FVA 1.6 L4	**D** **G**		RSA	MON	NED	BEL	FRA	GBR	GER	CAN	ITA	USA	MEX		0	NC
1967	Matra Sports	Ford Cosworth FVA 1.6 L4	**D** **G**	Jean-Pierre Beltoise					DNA					7	7		0	NC
1967	Matra Sports	Ford Cosworth FVA 1.6 L4	**D** **G**	Johnny Servoz-Gavin					DNA								0	NC
1968	Matra Sports	Ford Cosworth FVA 1.6 L4	**D**		RSA	ESP	MON	BEL	NED	FRA	GBR	GER	ITA	CAN	USA	MEX	**45**^{1}	**3rd**
1968	Matra Sports	Ford Cosworth FVA 1.6 L4	**D**	Jean-Pierre Beltoise	6												**45**^{1}	**3rd**
1968	Matra International	Ford Cosworth FVA 1.6 L4	**D**	Jackie Stewart	PO												**45**^{1}	**3rd**
1969	Matra Sports	Ford Cosworth FVA 1.6 L4	**D**		RSA	ESP	MON	NED	FRA	GBR	GER	ITA	CAN	USA	MEX		**66**^{2}	**1st**
1969	Matra Sports	Ford Cosworth FVA 1.6 L4	**D**	Henri Pescarolo							5						**66**^{2}	**1st**
1969	Matra Sports	Ford Cosworth FVA 1.6 L4	**D**	Johnny Servoz-Gavin							Ret						**66**^{2}	**1st**

^{1} One point scored by the MS7, all other points scored by the MS10.
^{2} No points scored by the MS7 as it was run in a Formula Two Category.

== Non-Championship Formula One results ==
(key)

Year	Entrant	Engine	Tyres	Drivers	1	2	3	4	5	6
1967	Tyrrell Racing Organisation	Ford Cosworth FVA 1.6 L4	D		ROC	SPC	INT	SYR	OUL	ESP
1967	Tyrrell Racing Organisation	Ford Cosworth FVA 1.6 L4	D	Jackie Stewart					2	Ret
1967	Matra Sports	Ford Cosworth FVA 1.6 L4	D	Jean-Pierre Beltoise						10
1967	Matra Sports	Ford Cosworth FVA 1.6 L4	D	Henri Pescarolo						7
