= Lotus 59 =

Single seater track racing car circa 1970

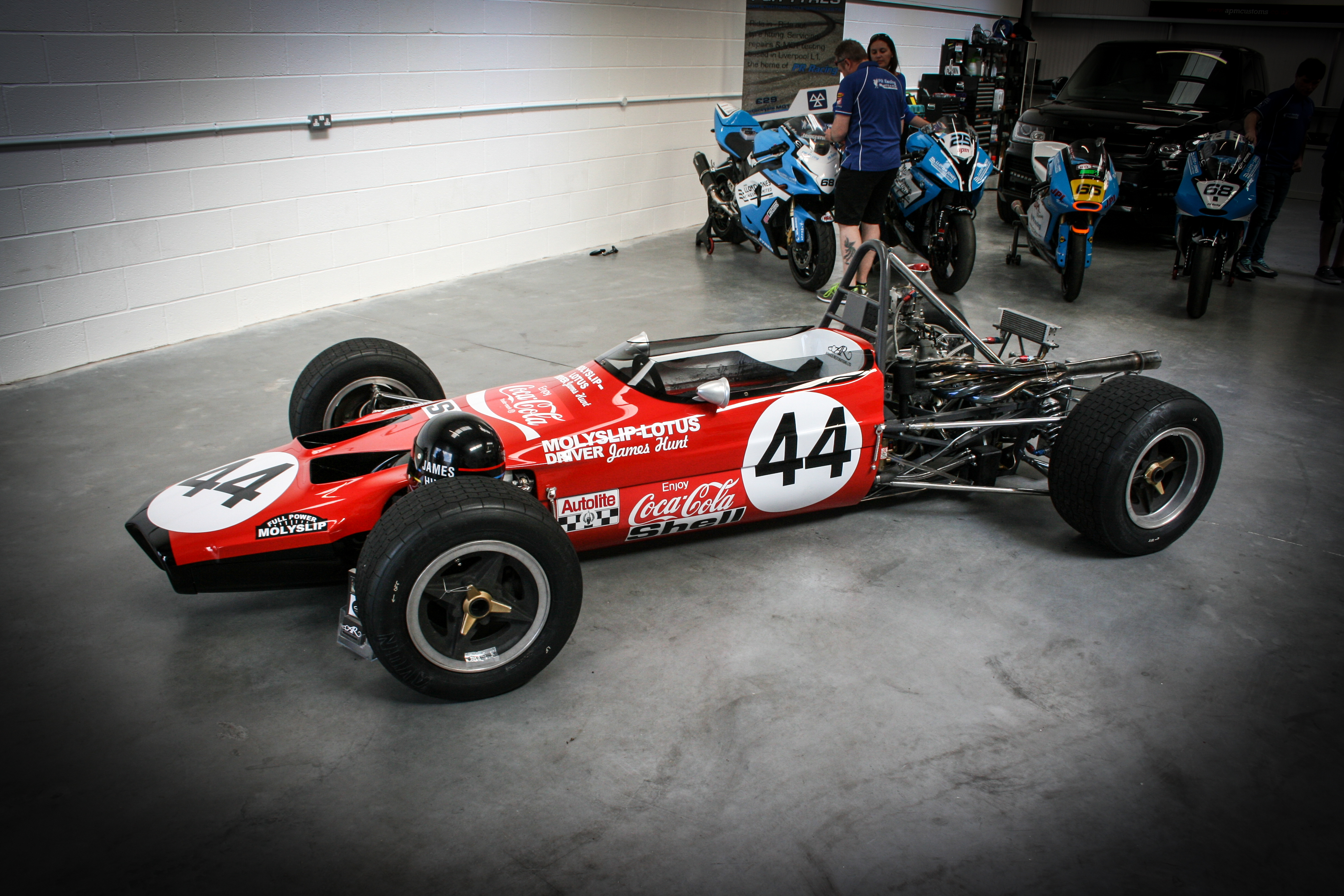
- James Hunt's Lotus 59 Formula 3 car from 1970

Overview
- Manufacturer: Lotus Components Ltd.
- Production: 1969-1970
- Designer: Dave Baldwin

Body and chassis
- Class: Formula Two, Formula B, Formula Three, Formula Ford
- Body style: Open wheel

Powertrain
- Engine: F2: 1598 cc Cosworth FVA; FB: 1594 cc Cosworth Mk.XIII; F3: 997 cc Cosworth MAE; FF: 1599 cc Ford Crossflow
- Transmission: 59B: Hewland FT200; 59: Hewland Mk.6

Dimensions
- Wheelbase: 92.5 inches
- Kerb weight: 390 KG

Chronology
- Predecessor: Lotus 41
- Successor: Lotus 69

The Lotus 59 is a racing car built by Lotus Components Ltd. for the 1969 and 1970 seasons of Formula 2, Formula 3, Formula Ford and Formula B.

== Design ==
Following the failure (at least in sales) of the Lotus 41, Lotus 59 was designed from the ground up by Dave Baldwin using rectangle steel tubing in a complex spaceframe configuration. This configuration was in response to the customer complaints on difficult and expensive repair on aluminium alloy monocoque Lotus 35 and the welded steel tubing and sheet steel combination on Lotus 41 of John Joyce design. The frame tubes were used as water passage to/from the radiator on the F3/FF versions, but were not used on the F2/FB version, using long water pipes mounted outside of the body instead. Oil cooler was mounted on the rear-most bulkhead above the transmission.

Lotus 59 originally came in two versions; 59 for Formula 3 and Formula Ford, 59B for Formula 2 and Formula B, all sharing the same 92.5" wheelbase, which was 2.5" longer than the previous 41/41X. Suspension was very conventional with double wishbone and outboard spring/damper unit up front, with top link and lower reversed wishbone combined with upper and lower radius arms and outboard spring/damper unit in the rear. Brakes were outboard in the front and rear.

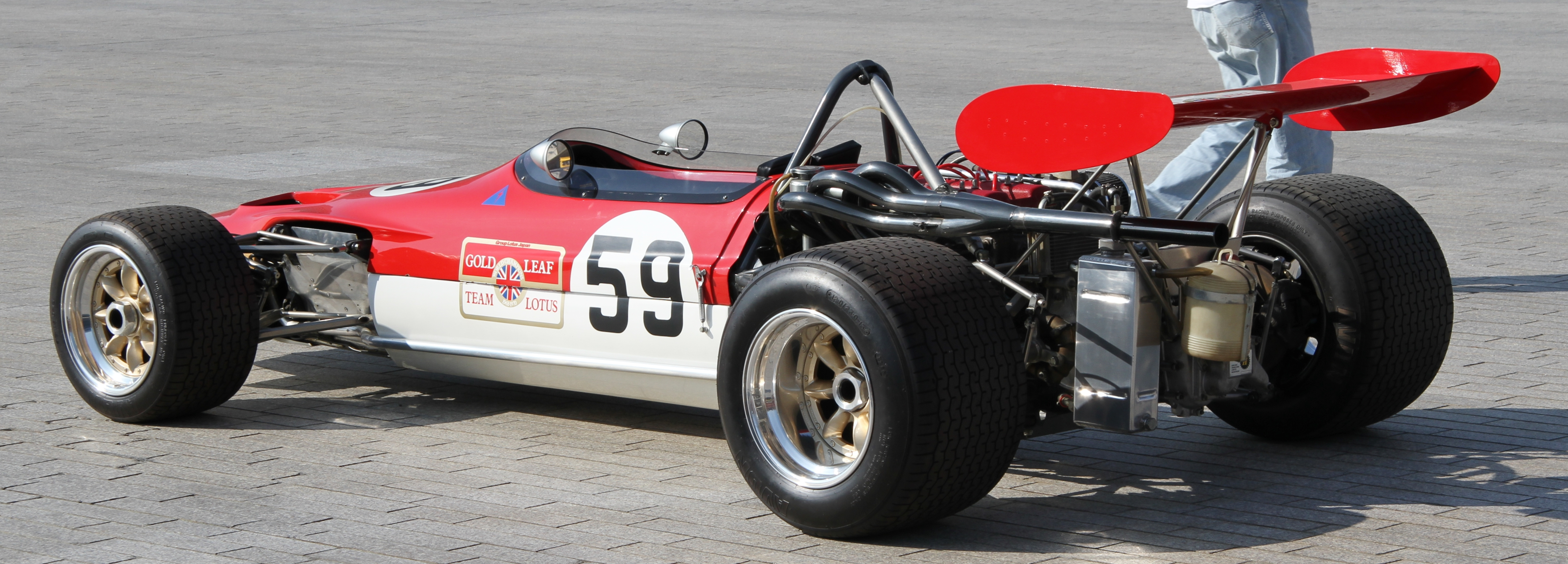
Lotus 59B in Formula B configuration. Note the water feed pipe to radiator on the body side

However, the front anti-dive geometry which was introduced on the Lotus 31, and the rear anti-squat geometry with unparallel radius arms (that counters the rear camber and toe-in reductions under braking) which was introduced with the 41C, were fully developed on the 41X (which had multiple suspension arm attachment points), and the setup found to be the best is incorporated into the 59 frame. While the 59 used Triumph Herald front uprights, the 59B used the Formula Two version Lotus 41X uprights and brakes shared with Lotus 47A. Hubs and wheels were knock-off type with spin-on central lock nut, except for the Formula Ford version, which had the Ford production 4 lugnut configuration as per the formula.

The 59 appeared for the first time on 27 December 1968 at the Brands Hatch Boxing Day meeting. After some initial problems on spring rates and on the oil circuit were solved, the design proved successful. Its strong point was the superb road holding which enabled the driver to put the power down more effectively than the competition exiting the corners on less-than-perfect road surface.

For 1970, 59B was succeeded by Lotus 69. The 59 was mostly unchanged for the year, but the chisel-shaped nose of Lotus 69 was retrofitted in mid-season. This new configuration is commonly known as 59A for F3, and as 59FB for Formula Ford.

Due to the closure of Lotus Components in 1971, Lotus 59 production records are incomplete, erratic and unreliable. However, about 46 chassis are believed to have been made with the newest known record of chassis number "59xF3/FF/46" with the build date of "13/12/70".
As it is customary for Lotus Components products, initial 59 frame assembly was carried out in-house, and then taken over by Arch Motors. The earliest known 'AM' serial number stamp is "AM-59FB5" on chassis number "59xB/F2/38".

Dave Baldwin joined many other Lotus Components employees to form GRD in 1971, and continued to support Lotus 59 and 69 users.

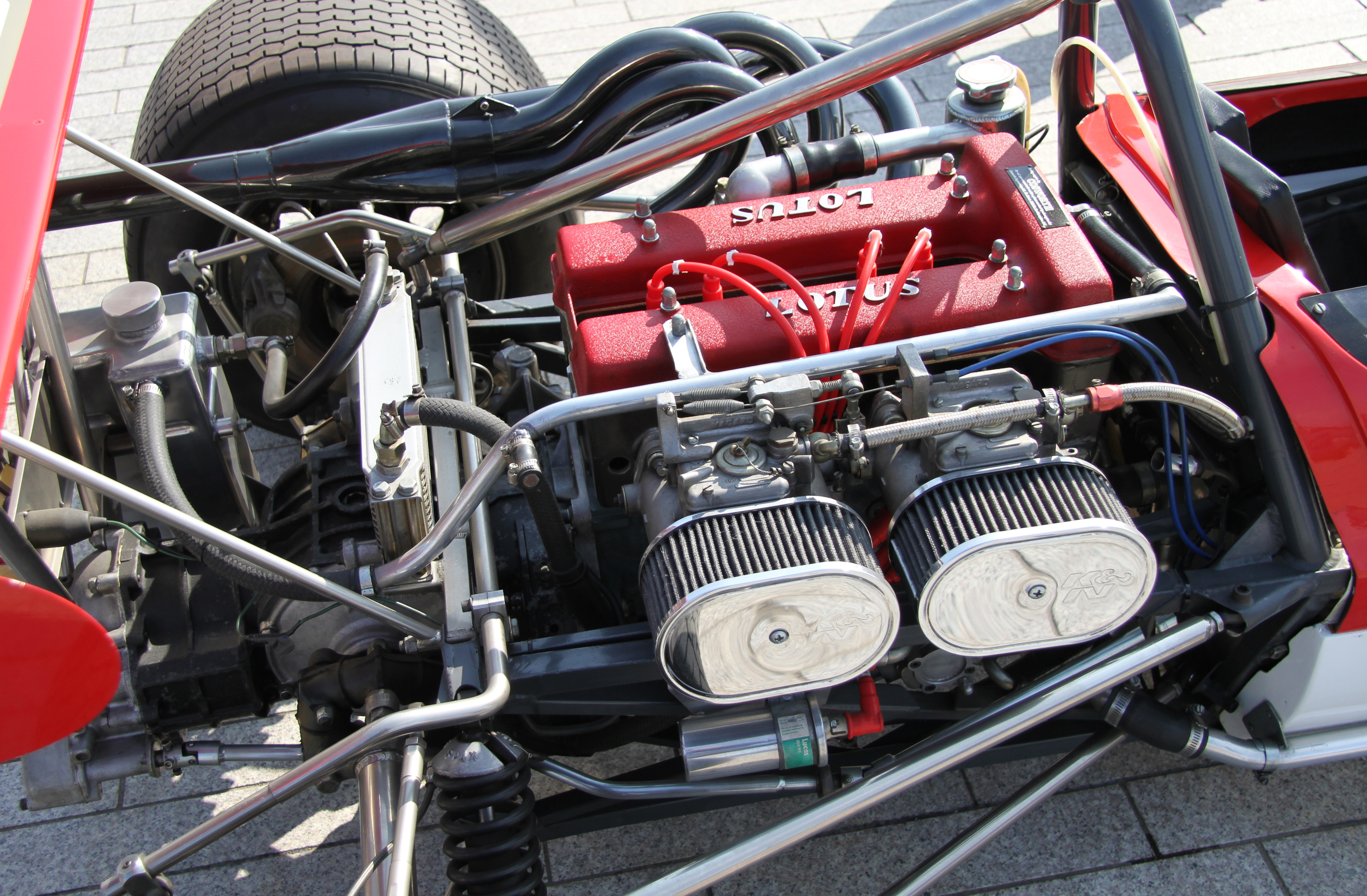
Cosworth Mk.XIII on 59B. Note the water return pipe shown lower right. Also, the angle difference between upper and lower radius arms is clearly seen

== Engines ==
59B - Formula 2 - 1598 cc Cosworth FVA
59B - Formula B - 1594 cc Cosworth Mk.XIII
59 - Formula 3 - 997 cc Cosworth MAE
59 - Formula Ford - 1599 cc Ford Crossflow

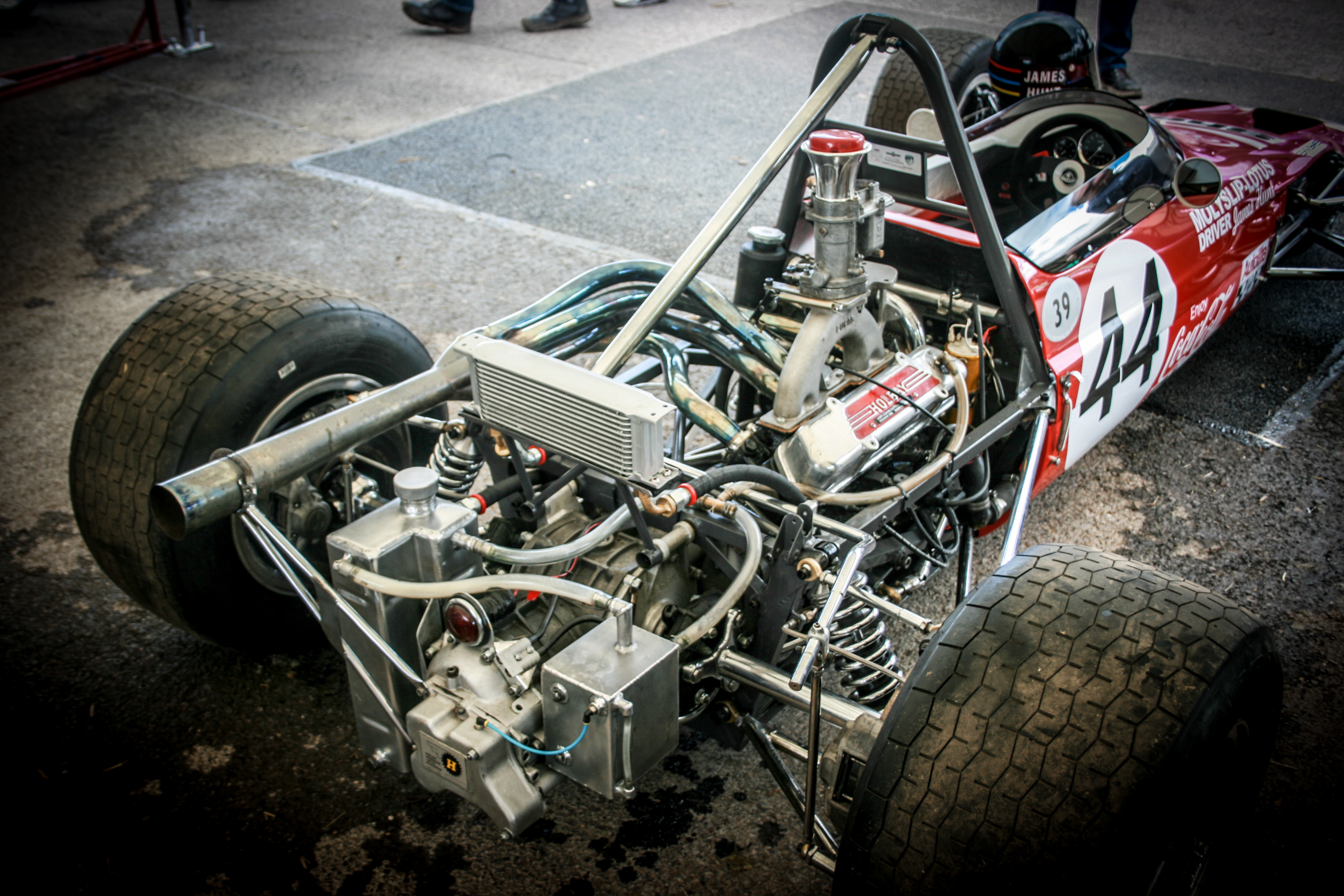
1969 Lotus 59 Formula 3 997cc engine.

== Records ==
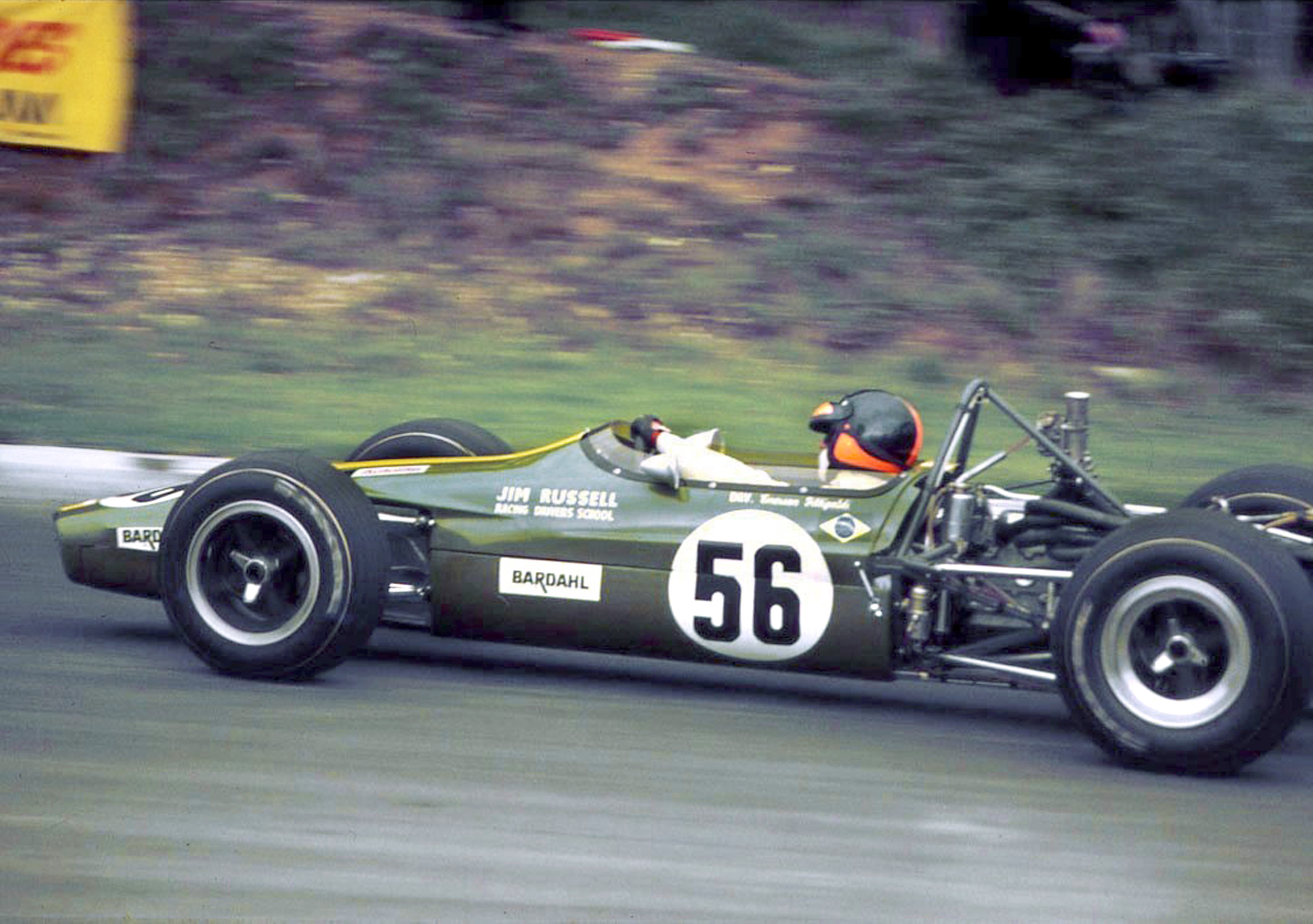
Emerson Fittipaldi on a Lotus 59 in the 1969 F3 Guards Trophy at Brands Hatch. Note the lack of body side water pipe in this F3 configuration

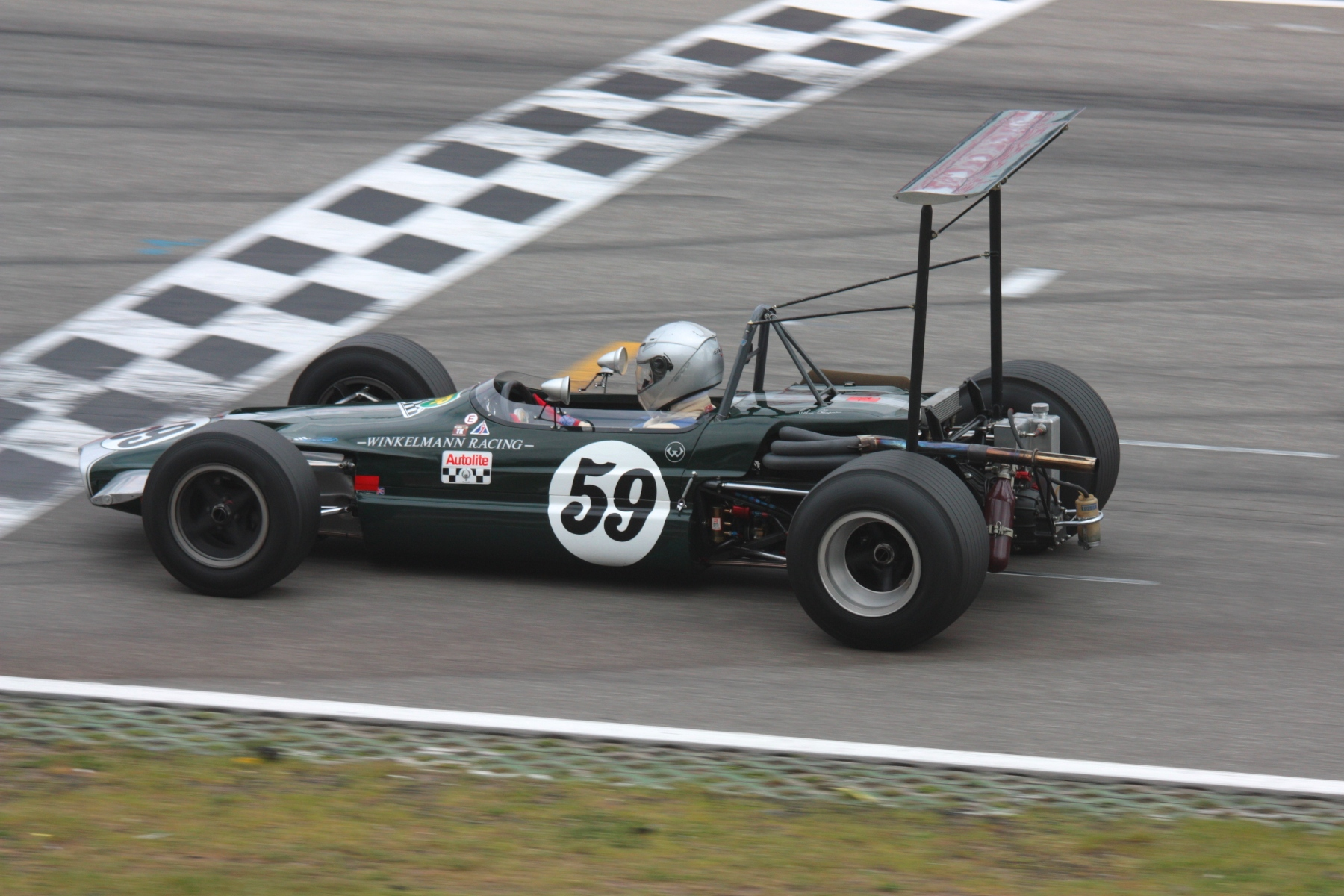
Lotus 59B in Formula 2 configuration with Winkelmann Racing livery

The successes include Jochen Rindt, who dominated or shared the podium with Jackie Stewart or Jean-Pierre Beltoise in almost all the 1969 F2 races he entered, driving the semi-works Roy Winkelmann Racing 59B, but was excluded from the championship standings because he (along with Stewart and Beltoise) was a "graded driver".

His non-graded teammates, Alan Rollinson and John Miles, scored some points in the championship, but were no match against the non-graded Johnny Servoz-Gavin on Matra MS7-Ford, Hubert Hahne on Lola T102-BMW, François Cévert on Tecno-Ford, and Henri Pescarolo on Matra MS7-Ford.
Gold Leaf Team Lotus ran Roy Pike and Mo Nunn on 59B in British F2 races in the 1969 season.

Emerson Fittipaldi on a 59 won nine F3 races in the MCD Lombard Championship to become the 1969 champion. Also, Freddy Kottulinsky and Tetsu Ikuzawa won several F3 races on the 59 in 1969.

For the 1970 season, Emerson Fittipaldi and Tetsu Ikuzawa moved up to Formula Two with the less successful semi-works Lotus 69, and finished the season in the 3rd and 6th places respectively, beaten by Clay Regazzoni on Tecno-Ford and Derek Bell on Brabham BT30-Ford/BMW. James Hunt won several races in his Molyslip Lotus 59, including coming 2nd in heat 1 and winning heat 2 at Brands Hatch 17 July 1970. Hunt also famously crashed into Dave Morgan at Crystal Palace in October of that year, Murray Walker coined the word shunt at that meeting.

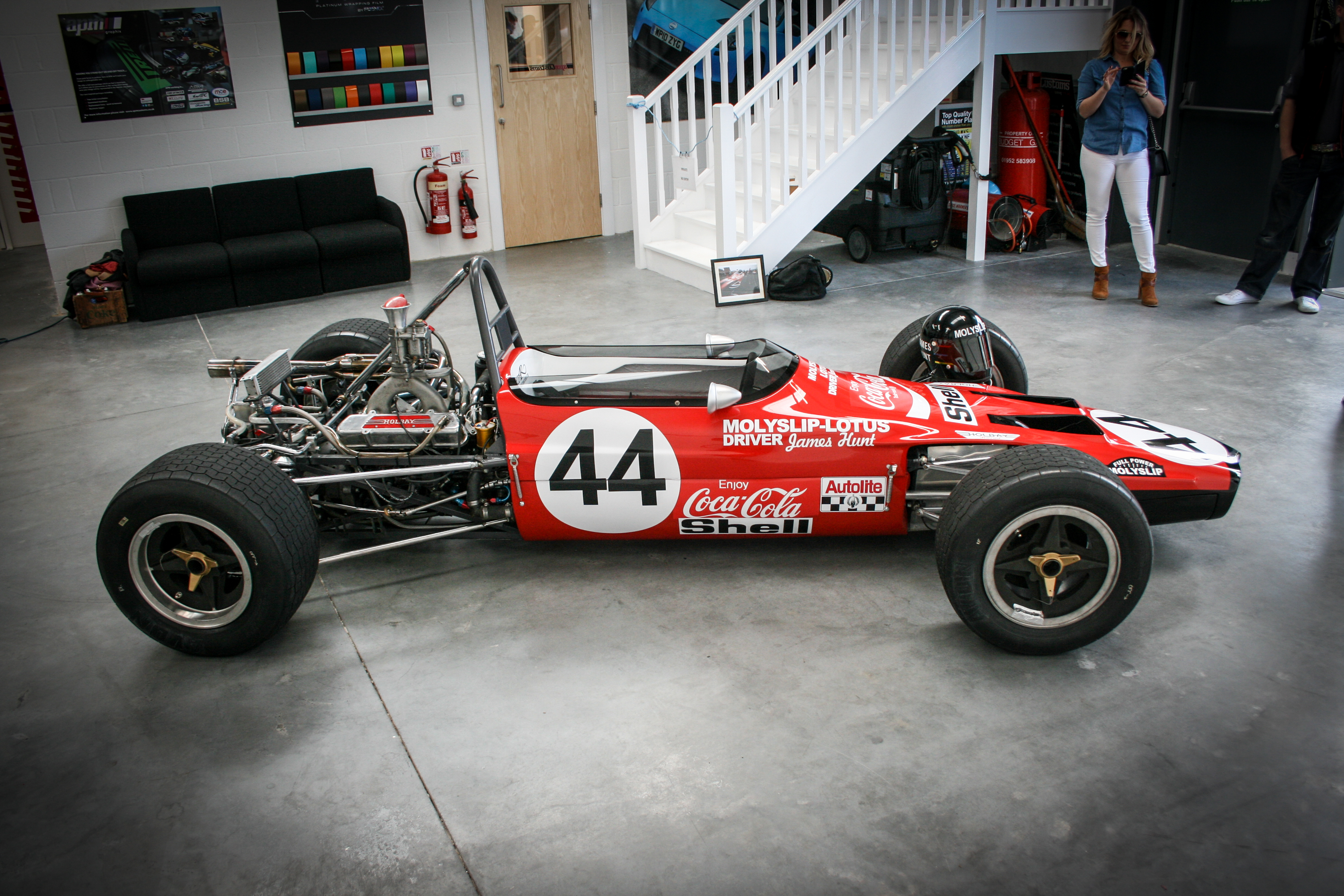
James Hunt 17 July 1970 winning Lotus 59 Formula 3 car

In F3, Carlos Pace on a 59 won the F3 Forward Trust Championship in the UK for the 1970 season. Freddy Kottulinsky and Sten Axelsson of the Lipton Tea team won four Formula 3 European Championship races.

== Formula One World Championship results ==
Year	Entrant	Engine	Tyres	Drivers	1	2	3	4	5	6	7	8	9	10	11	Points	WCC
1969	Roy Winkelmann Racing	Ford Cosworth FVA 1.6 L4	F		RSA	ESP	MON	NED	FRA	GBR	GER	ITA	CAN	USA	MEX	—N/a	
1969	Roy Winkelmann Racing	Ford Cosworth FVA 1.6 L4	F	(West Germany) Hans Herrmann							DNS					—N/a	
1969	Roy Winkelmann Racing	Ford Cosworth FVA 1.6 L4	F	(West Germany) Rolf Stommelen							8					—N/a	
