= Piers Courage =

British racing driver (1942–1970)

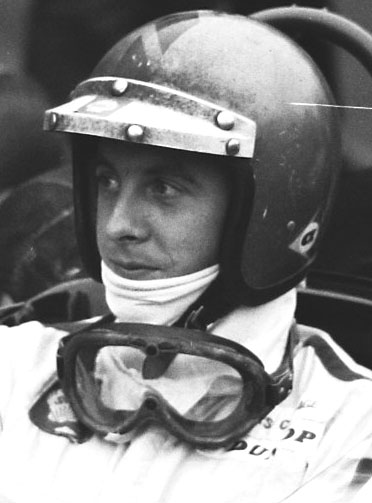
- Courage at the 1968 German Grand Prix
- Born: Piers Raymond Courage; 27 May 1942; Colchester, Essex, England
- Died: 21 June 1970 (aged 28); Circuit Park Zandvoort, North Holland, Netherlands
- Cause of death: Injuries sustained at the 1970 Dutch Grand Prix

Formula One World Championship career
- Nationality: (United Kingdom) British
- Active years: 1967–1970
- Team(s): Lotus, Parnell, Frank Williams
- Entries: 29 (27 starts)
- Championships: 0
- Wins: 0
- Podiums: 2
- Career points: 20
- Pole positions: 0
- Fastest laps: 0
- First entry: 1967 South African Grand Prix
- Last entry: 1970 Dutch Grand Prix

Piers Raymond Courage (27 May 1942 – 21 June 1970) was a British racing driver, who competed in Formula One from 1967 to 1970.

Courage participated in 29 World Championship Formula One Grands Prix for Lotus, Parnell and Frank Williams, debuting at the 1967 South African Grand Prix. He achieved two podium finishes, and scored 20 championship points.

== Biography ==
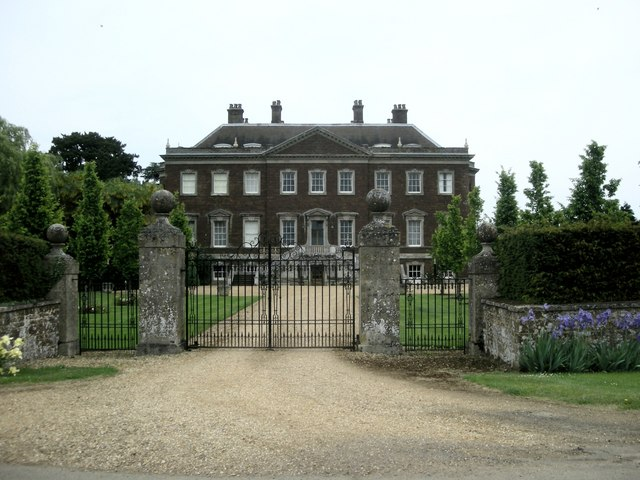
Courage's family were Lords of the Manor of Edgcote from the 1920s until 2005

Courage was the eldest son of Richard Courage (1915–1994), Lord of the manor of Edgcote, whose aunt, Dorothy Courage (1877–1972, later De Zoete) is referenced in Burke's Landed Gentry having married another well-known sportsman, cricketer Herman de Zoete in July 1903. Piers was the heir to the Courage brewing dynasty of which his father was chairman. Educated at Eton College, Piers began his racing career in his own Lotus 7.

Following a brief stint touring the European F3 racing circuit in 1964 with a Lotus 22, along with Jonathan Williams, good results persuaded him to pursue a full season in 1965. It was in this season, driving a 1.0L F3 Brabham for Charles Lucas, that he first formed an alliance with Frank Williams, at that time Lucas's other driver and sometime mechanic. A string of good results, including four high-profile wins, encouraged Colin Chapman to offer Courage a seat in a Lotus 41 for the 1966 F3 season. This car was inferior to the dominant Brabhams but Courage still managed to outperform them on occasion, earning him a step up to the F2 category for the 1966 German Grand Prix, where he crashed out.

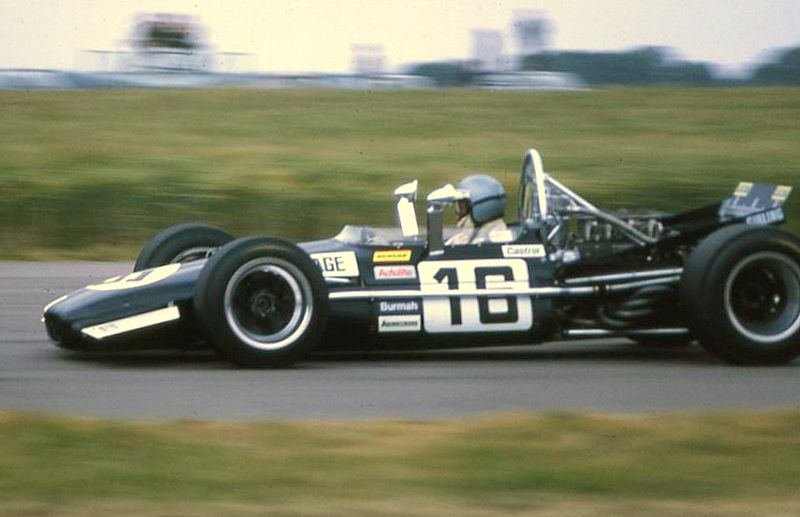
Piers Courage in a Frank Williams Racing Cars Brabham BT26A at the 1969 British Grand Prix

Signed by the BRM works Formula 1 team for 1967, alongside Chris Irwin, Courage's wild driving style caused him to repeatedly crash out of races and his tendency to spin at crucial moments led to the team dropping him after the 1967 Monaco Grand Prix. He completed the remainder of the season concentrating on his alternative drive, as was common in the 1960s, in John Coombs's F2 McLaren M4A, finishing fourth in the unclassified drivers' championship. At the end of the season, he purchased the car from Coombs. A good run in the McLaren during the winter Tasman Series, including a win at the last race, resulted in Tim Parnell offering a drive in his works-supported Reg Parnell Racing BRM team for 1968. In addition to a good run in F1 in 1968 – including points-scoring finishes in France and Italy – Courage also drove for old friend Frank Williams's F2 team. When Frank Williams Racing Cars decided to make the step up to F1 in 1969, Courage was their first choice as driver.

In Courage's hands, Williams's dark-blue liveried Brabham BT26 was more than a match for many of the works teams. He finished second in both the Monaco Grand Prix and the US Grand Prix, at Watkins Glen. Perhaps his finest drive of the season, though, was during the 1969 Italian Grand Prix at the high-speed Monza circuit. Despite an older car, and a power deficit, he managed to stay with the leading pack for the majority of the race. Only fuel starvation caused his pace to slow near the end, and he finally finished in fifth. A second fifth place, in the British Grand Prix, saw Courage finish the season on sixteen points in eighth place in the drivers' championship.

== Accident and death ==
=== Death ===
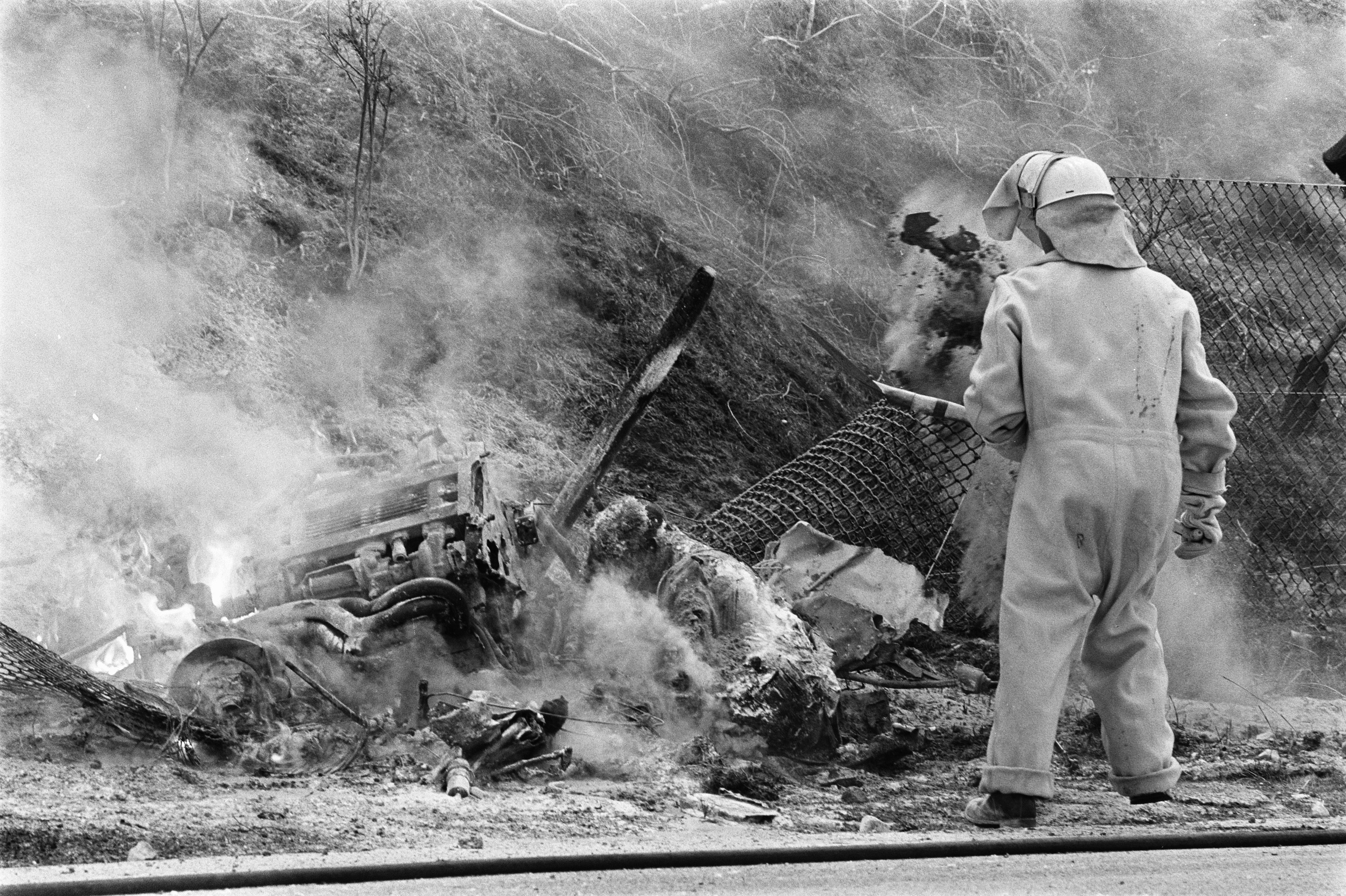
Courage's fatal accident

Following a business arrangement with Alejandro de Tomaso, Williams switched to a newly designed De Tomaso chassis for the 1970 Formula One season. Unfortunately for Courage, the De Tomaso proved to be overweight and unreliable, and only a third place in the non-championship International Trophy alleviated a poor string of results in the early season. The Dutch Grand Prix seemed to be going slightly better, with Courage qualifying in ninth place around the Zandvoort Circuit. Running in the middle of the field, the De Tomaso's front suspension or steering broke on the bump at Tunnel Oost, causing the car to suddenly go straight on instead of finishing the high-speed bend. It then rode up an embankment (one of the Zandvoort dunes) and disintegrated, with the engine breaking loose from the monocoque, upon which it burst into flames. To lighten the De Tomaso, magnesium was used in its chassis and suspension. The magnesium burned so intensely that many nearby trees and bushes were set alight.

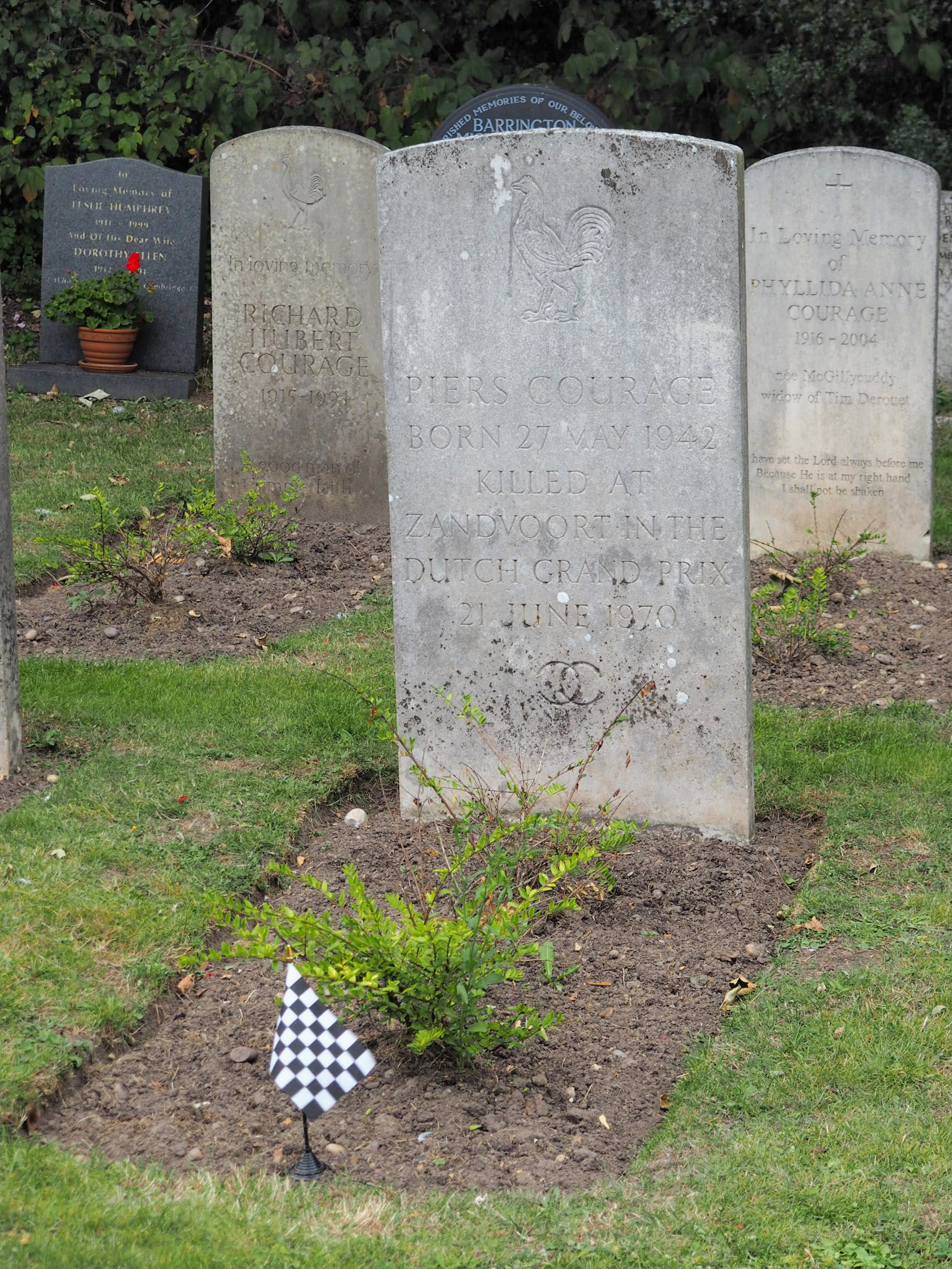
Courage's gravestone

During the impact, Courage was fatally injured when one of the front wheels broke off and hit Courage in the head, tearing away his helmet, which together with the wheel rolled out of the cloud of dust at the same time. Courage was survived by his wife, Lady Sarah Marguerite Curzon (1945-2025), and his two sons, Jason Piers Courage (b. 10 February 1967) and Amos Edward Sebastian Courage (b. 26 February 1969). He was buried in St Mary the Virgin churchyard, Shenfield, Essex.

=== Aftermath ===
During the qualifying session at the 1970 Italian Grand Prix, Jochen Rindt ran with higher gear ratios fitted to his car to take advantage of the reduced drag, increasing the car's potential top speed to 330 km/h (205 mph). On his fifth lap of his qualifying session, he crashed heavily at the approach to the Parabolica corner, resulting in multiple fatal injuries. Lotus withdrew all cars from the race. Rindt won the World Drivers' Championship posthumously.

Just three years later, Roger Williamson crashed fatally when his car came to rest upside down and burst into flames at the same spot, the Tunnel Oost bump, where Courage's accident had started.

== Racing record ==
=== Complete Formula One World Championship results ===
(key)

Year	Entrant	Chassis	Engine	1	2	3	4	5	6	7	8	9	10	11	12	13	WDC	Pts
1966	Team Lotus	Lotus 44 F2	Ford Cosworth SCA 1.0 L4	MON	BEL	FRA	GBR	NED	GER; Ret	ITA	USA	MEX					NC	0
1967	Reg Parnell Racing	Lotus 25/33	BRM P60 2.1 V8	RSA; Ret													NC	0
1967	Reg Parnell Racing	BRM P261	BRM P60 2.1 V8		MON; Ret	NED	BEL	FRA	GBR; DNS	GER	CAN	ITA	USA	MEX			NC	0
1968	Reg Parnell Racing	BRM P126	BRM P101 3.0 V12	RSA	ESP; Ret	MON; Ret	BEL; Ret	NED; Ret	FRA; 6	GBR; 8	GER; 8	ITA; 4	CAN; Ret	USA; Ret	MEX; Ret		19th	4
1969	Frank Williams Racing Cars	Brabham BT26A	Ford Cosworth DFV 3.0 V8	RSA	ESP; Ret	MON; 2	NED; Ret	FRA; Ret	GBR; 5	GER; Ret	ITA; 5	CAN; Ret	USA; 2	MEX; 10			8th	16
1970	Frank Williams Racing Cars	De Tomaso 505/38	Ford Cosworth DFV 3.0 V8	RSA; Ret	ESP; DNS	MON; NC	BEL; Ret	NED; Ret	FRA	GBR	GER	AUT	ITA	CAN	USA	MEX	NC	0

=== Complete Formula One non-championship results ===
(key)

Year	Entrant	Chassis	Engine	1	2	3	4	5	6
1965	Bob Gerard Racing	Cooper T71/73	Ford 109E 1.5 L4	ROC	SYR	SMT	INT	MED; DNQ	RAN
1967	Charles Lucas Engineering	Lotus 35	Martin 3.0 V8	ROC; DNS					
1967	Reg Parnell Racing	Lotus 25/33	BRM P60 2.1 V8		SPC; Ret	INT	SYR	OUL	ESP
1968	Reg Parnell Racing	BRM P126	BRM P101 3.0 V12	ROC	INT; 5	OUL; Ret			
1969	Frank Williams Racing Cars	Brabham BT26A	Ford Cosworth DFV 3.0 V8	ROC; Ret	INT; 5	MAD	OUL		
1970	Frank Williams Racing Cars	De Tomaso 505/38	Ford Cosworth DFV 3.0 V8	ROC	INT; 3	OUL			

=== Complete 24 Hours of Le Mans results ===
Year	Team	Co-drivers	Car	Class	Laps	Pos.	Class pos.
1966	(United Kingdom) Maranello Concessionaires	(United States) Roy Pike	Ferrari 275 GTB	GT; 5.0	313	8th	1st
1967	(United Kingdom) Maranello Concessionaires	(United Kingdom) Richard Attwood	Ferrari 412P	P 5.0	208	DNF	DNF
1969	(France) Equipe Matra – Elf	(France) Jean-Pierre Beltoise	Matra-Simca MS650	P 3.0	368	4th	2nd
1970	(Italy) Autodelta S.P.A.	(Italy) Andrea de Adamich	Alfa Romeo T33/3	P 3.0	222	DNF	DNF

=== Complete Tasman Series results ===
(key)

Year	Entrant	Chassis	Engine	1	2	3	4	5	6	7	8	Pos.	Pts
1967	Owen Racing Organisation	BRM P261	BRM 2.1 V8	PUK	WIG	LAK; Ret	WAR	SAN	LON			NC	0
1968	John Coombs	McLaren M4A	Ford Cosworth FVA 1.6 L4	PUK; 3	LEV; 2	WIG; 4	TER; 5	SUR; 3	WAR; 3	SAN; 5	LON; 1	3rd	34
1969	Frank Williams Racing	Brabham BT24	Ford Cosworth DFW 2.5 V8	PUK; 3	LEV; 2	WIG; 4	TER; 1	LAK; Ret	WAR; Ret	SAN; Ret		3rd	22

=== Complete European Formula Two Championship results ===
(key)

Year	Entrant	Chassis	Engine	1	2	3	4	5	6	7	8	9	10	Pos.	Pts
1967	John Coombs	McLaren M4A	Ford Cosworth FVA 1.6 L4	SNE; 7	SIL; Ret	NÜR; 5	HOC; 3	TUL; 9	JAR; 8	ZAN; 2	PER; Ret	BRH; Ret	VAL; Ret	4th	24
1968	Frank Williams Racing Cars	Brabham BT23C	Ford Cosworth FVA 1.6 L4	HOC; 3	THR; Ret	JAR; DNS	PAL; Ret	TUL; Ret	ZAN; 10	PER; 2	HOC	VAL		6th	13
1969	Frank Williams Racing Cars	Brabham BT23C	Ford Cosworth FVA 1.6 L4	THR; 7	HOC; 3	NÜR	JAR; 3	TUL						NC	0^{‡}
1969	Frank Williams Racing Cars	Brabham BT30	Ford Cosworth FVA 1.6 L4						PER; 1					NC	0^{‡}
1969	Alejandro de Tomaso	De Tomaso 103	Ford Cosworth FVA 1.6 L4							VAL; Ret				NC	0^{‡}

^{‡} Graded drivers not eligible for European Formula Two Championship points

Preceded by Gerhard Mitter	Formula One fatal accidents 21 June 1970	Succeeded by Jochen Rindt
