= 1968 British Grand Prix =

Formula One race held in 1968

Race details
- Date: 20 July 1968
- Official name: XXI RAC British Grand Prix
- Location: Brands Hatch, Kent, England
- Course: Permanent racing facility
- Course length: 4.265 km (2.650 miles)
- Distance: 80 laps, 341.200 km (212.012 miles)
- Weather: Hot, Dry

Pole position
Driver	(United Kingdom) Graham Hill	Lotus-Ford
- Time: 1:28.9

Fastest lap
Driver	(Switzerland) Jo Siffert	Lotus-Ford
- Time: 1:29.7 on lap 42

Podium
First	(Switzerland) Jo Siffert	Lotus-Ford
Second	(New Zealand) Chris Amon	Ferrari
Third	(Belgium) Jacky Ickx	Ferrari

The 1968 British Grand Prix was a Formula One motor race held at the Brands Hatch Circuit on 20 July 1968. It was race 7 of 12 in both the 1968 World Championship of Drivers and the 1968 International Cup for Formula One Manufacturers. The 80-lap race was won by Jo Siffert, his first Formula One victory, and the first victory by a Swiss driver. Siffert's win also marked the 9th and final win for the privateer Rob Walker Racing Team.

== Classification ==
=== Qualifying ===
Pos	No	Driver	Constructor	Time	Gap
1	8	(United Kingdom) Graham Hill	Lotus-Ford	1:28.9	—
2	9	(United Kingdom) Jackie Oliver	Lotus-Ford	1:29.4	+0.5
3	5	(New Zealand) Chris Amon	Ferrari	1:29.5	+0.6
4	22	(Switzerland) Jo Siffert	Lotus-Ford	1:29.7	+0.8
5	4	(Austria) Jochen Rindt	Brabham-Repco	1:29.9	+1.0
6	24	(United States) Dan Gurney	Eagle-Weslake	1:30.0	+1.1
7	14	(United Kingdom) Jackie Stewart	Matra-Ford	1:30.0	+1.1
8	3	(Australia) Jack Brabham	Brabham-Repco	1:30.2	+1.3
9	7	(United Kingdom) John Surtees	Honda	1:30.3	+1.4
10	2	(New Zealand) Bruce McLaren	McLaren-Ford	1:30.4	+1.5
11	1	(New Zealand) Denny Hulme	McLaren-Ford	1:30.4	+1.5
12	6	(Belgium) Jacky Ickx	Ferrari	1:31.0	+2.1
13	10	(Mexico) Pedro Rodríguez	BRM	1:31.6	+2.7
14	18	(France) Jean-Pierre Beltoise	Matra	1:31.6	+2.7
15	11	(United Kingdom) Richard Attwood	BRM	1:31.7	+2.8
16	20	(United Kingdom) Piers Courage	BRM	1:32.3	+3.4
17	15	(United Kingdom) Vic Elford	Cooper-BRM	1:33.0	+4.1
18	16	(United Kingdom) Robin Widdows	Cooper-BRM	1:34.0	+5.1
19	19	(Switzerland) Silvio Moser	Brabham-Repco	1:35.4	+6.5
20	23	(Sweden) Jo Bonnier	McLaren-BRM	1:36.8	+7.9

=== Race ===
Pos	No	Driver	Constructor	Laps	Time/Retired	Grid	Points
1	22	(Switzerland) Jo Siffert	Lotus-Ford	80	2:01:20.3	4	9
2	5	(New Zealand) Chris Amon	Ferrari	80	+ 4.4	3	6
3	6	(Belgium) Jacky Ickx	Ferrari	79	+ 1 lap	12	4
4	1	(New Zealand) Denny Hulme	McLaren-Ford	79	+ 1 lap	11	3
5	7	(United Kingdom) John Surtees	Honda	78	+ 2 laps	9	2
6	14	(United Kingdom) Jackie Stewart	Matra-Ford	78	+ 2 laps	7	1
7	2	(New Zealand) Bruce McLaren	McLaren-Ford	77	+ 3 laps	10	
8	20	(United Kingdom) Piers Courage	BRM	72	+ 8 laps	16	
Ret	4	(Austria) Jochen Rindt	Brabham-Repco	55	Fuel leak	5	
Ret	10	(Mexico) Pedro Rodríguez	BRM	52	Engine	13	
NC	19	(Switzerland) Silvio Moser	Brabham-Repco	52	+ 28 laps	19	
Ret	9	(United Kingdom) Jackie Oliver	Lotus-Ford	43	Transmission	2	
Ret	16	(United Kingdom) Robin Widdows	Cooper-BRM	34	Ignition	18	
Ret	8	(United Kingdom) Graham Hill	Lotus-Ford	26	Halfshaft	1	
Ret	15	(United Kingdom) Vic Elford	Cooper-BRM	26	Engine	17	
Ret	18	(France) Jean-Pierre Beltoise	Matra	11	Engine	14	
Ret	11	(United Kingdom) Richard Attwood	BRM	10	Radiator	15	
Ret	24	(United States) Dan Gurney	Eagle-Weslake	8	Fuel pump	6	
Ret	23	(Sweden) Jo Bonnier	McLaren-BRM	6	Engine	20	
Ret	3	(Australia) Jack Brabham	Brabham-Repco	0	Engine	8	

== Notes ==
- This was the Formula One World Championship debut for British driver Robin Widdows.
- This was the 10th Grand Prix win for a Ford-powered car.

== Championship standings after the race ==
Drivers' Championship standings

Pos	Driver	Points
1	(United Kingdom) Graham Hill	24
2	(Belgium) Jacky Ickx	20
3	(United Kingdom) Jackie Stewart	17
4	(New Zealand) Denny Hulme	15
5	(Mexico) Pedro Rodríguez	10

Constructors' Championship standings

	Pos	Constructor	Points
	1	(United Kingdom) Lotus-Ford	38
1	2	(Italy) Ferrari	25
1	3	(United Kingdom) McLaren-Ford	22
	4	(France) Matra-Ford	20
	5	(United Kingdom) BRM	17

- Note: Only the top five positions are included for both sets of standings.

Previous race: 1968 French Grand Prix	FIA Formula One World Championship; 1968 season	Next race: 1968 German Grand Prix
Previous race: 1967 British Grand Prix	British Grand Prix	Next race: 1969 British Grand Prix
