= Lotus 41 =

1966 Formula Three racecar

Lotus 41 Lotus 41B Lotus 41C
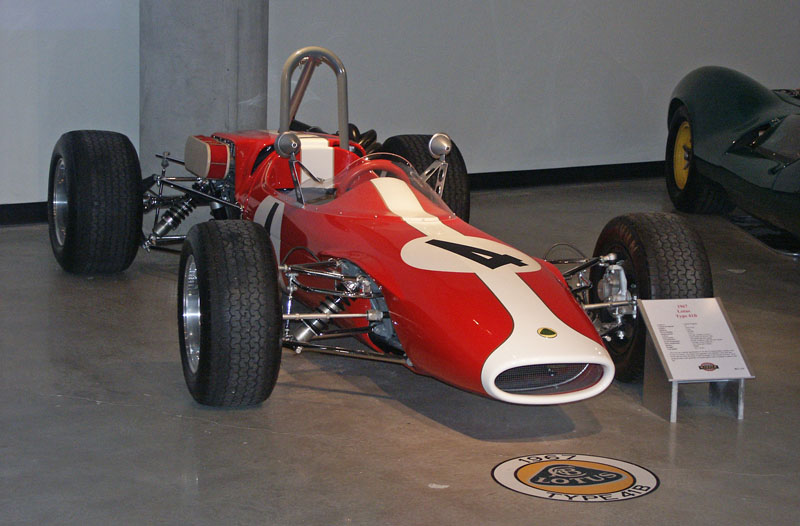
- A Lotus 41B on display

Overview
- Manufacturer: Lotus Components Ltd.
- Production: 1966-1968
- Designer: John Joyce

Body and chassis
- Class: Formula Two, Formula Three
- Body style: Open wheel

Powertrain
- Engine: 997 cc Ford Cosworth MAE Straight 4
- Transmission: Hewland Mk VI 4 speed Manual

Dimensions
- Wheelbase: 89.9 inches
- Kerb weight: 420 KG

Chronology
- Predecessor: Lotus 39
- Successor: Lotus 59

The Lotus 41 was a Lotus Formula 3 and Formula 2 racing car which ran from 1966 - 1968.

John Joyce, Bowin Cars founder, was the Lotus chief designer and was assisted by Dave Baldwin. They started with a clean sheet of paper. The chassis was a welded tubular steel space frame. The racing classes of this period imposed minimum weight requirements, so steel could be used in place of aluminium without a weight penalty. The most notable feature of the new design was the extensive use of stressed steel panels in the bulkheads, welded steel around the footwell and the instrument panel, a welded sheet of steel surrounding the driver's shoulder, and a double-sided steel cradle surrounding the gearbox. Floors were also welded for additional stiffness.

Another clever design feature of the Type 41 was the use of a rear bulkhead as an oil overflow collector. Even the front oil tank had its overflow routed through a labyrinthine path using chassis tubes all the way to the back.

The chassis of the Formula 2 Type 41 was also considered as the bases for a possible sports-racing car, using the Type 868 V8 engine of 500 bhp, although nothing eventually came of these plans.

== Gallery ==
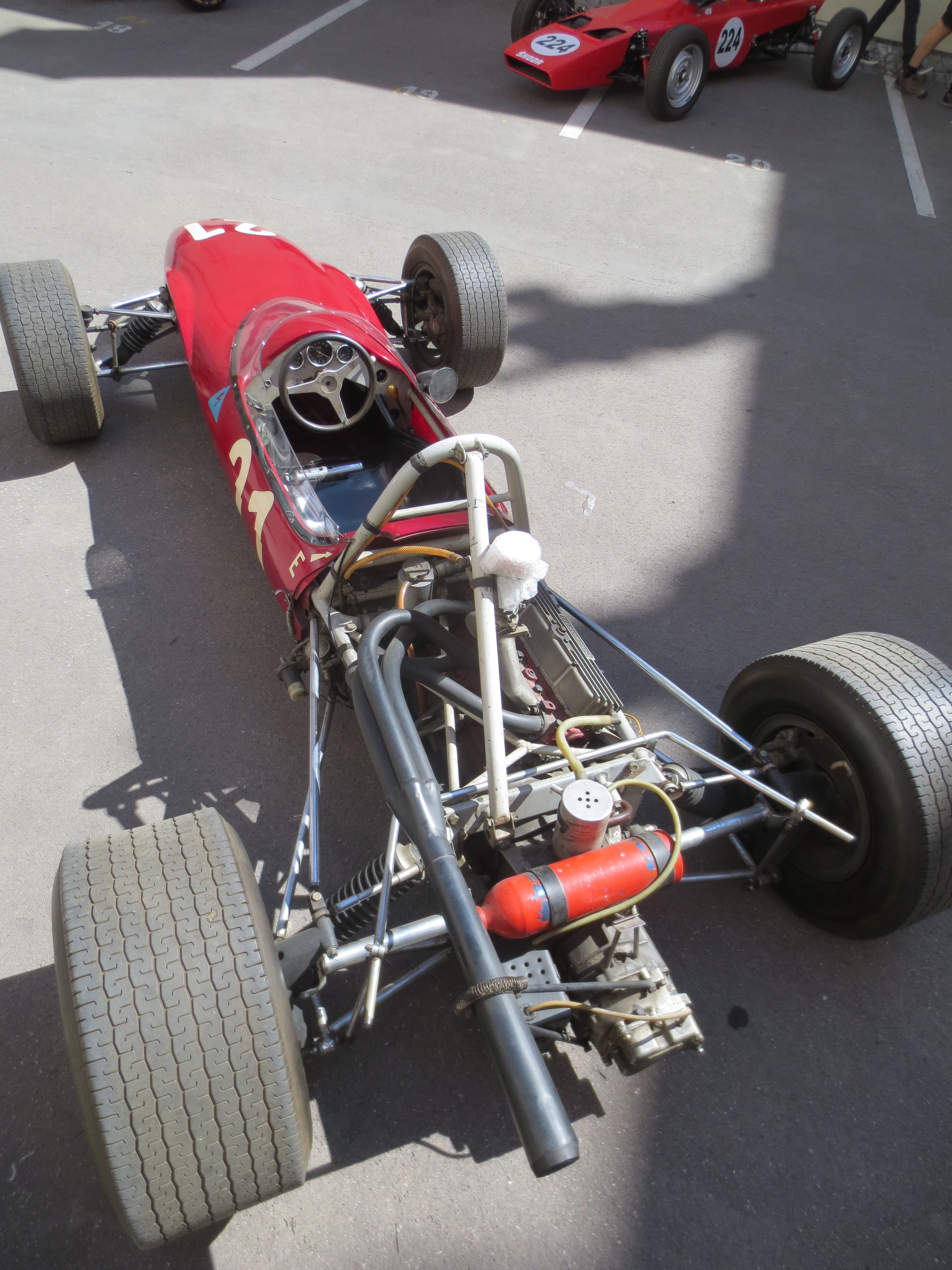
A Lotus 41C

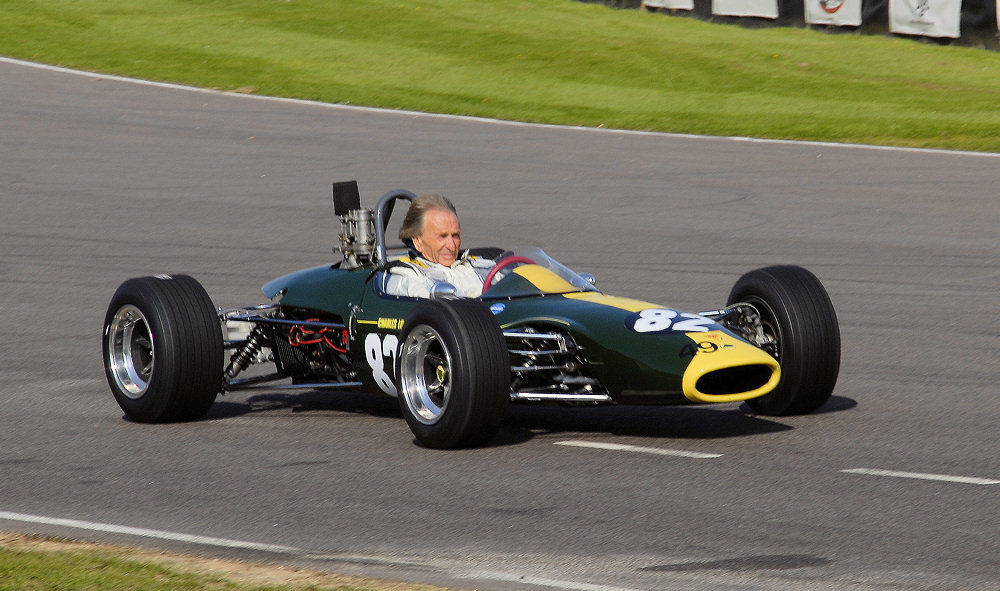
Derek Bell demonstrating a Lotus 41 at Goodwood Festival of Speed
