= Brabham BT30 =

Open-wheel Formula 2 racing car

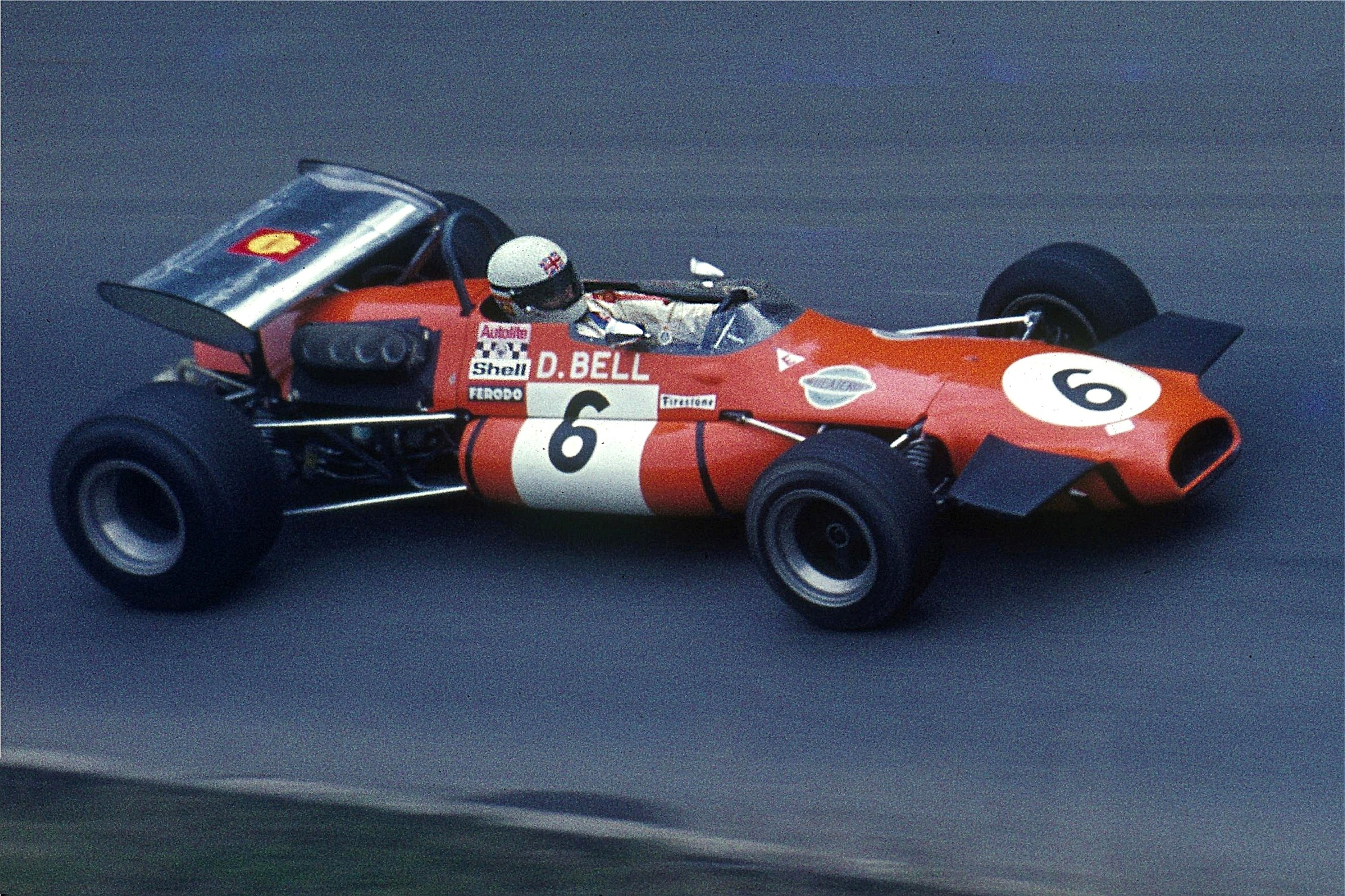
Derek Bell in the 1970 Brabham BT30 at the Nurburgring

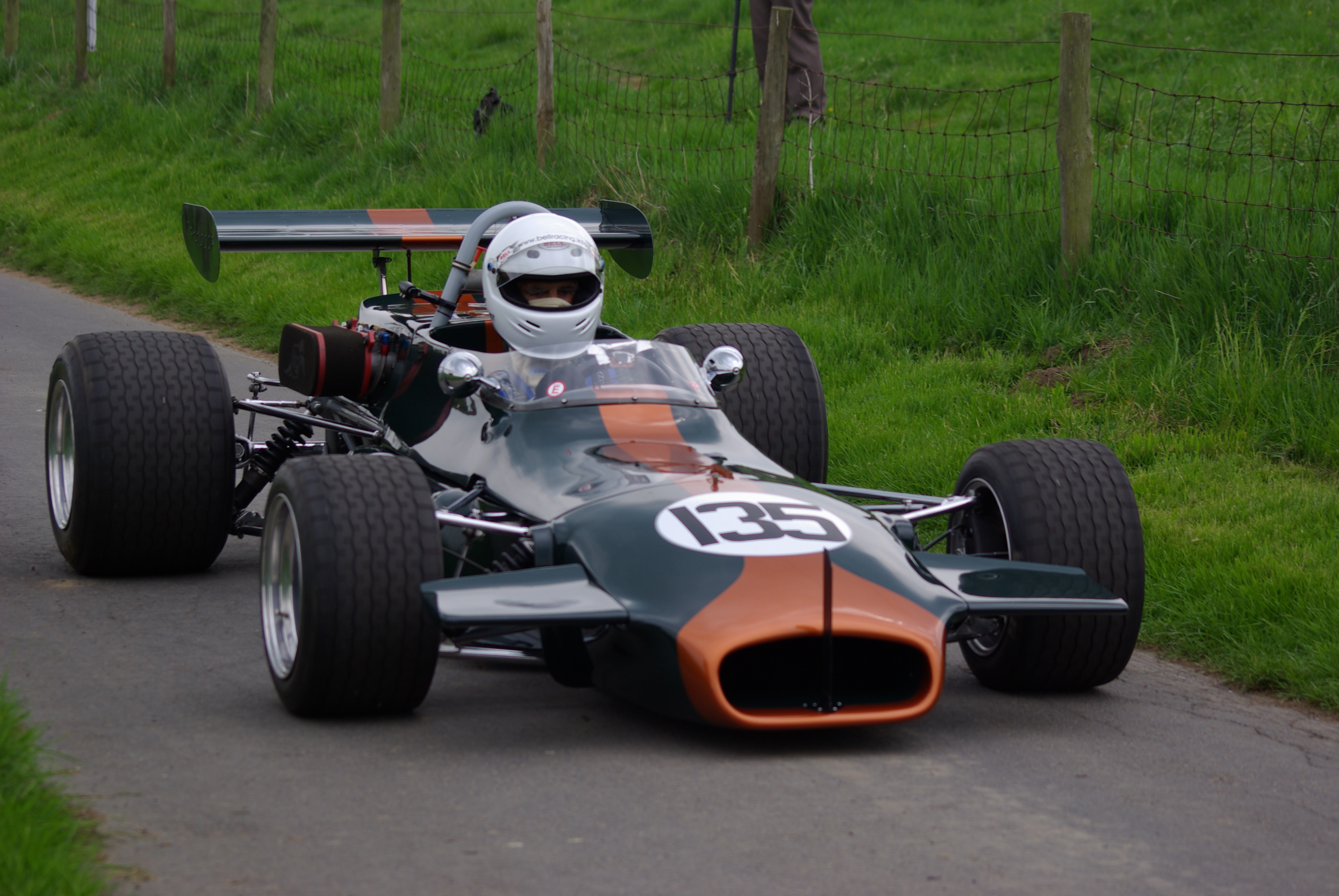
Brabham BT30 at the Harewood Vintage and Classic Hill Climb in 2010

The Brabham BT30 was an open-wheel Formula 2 racing car used in the 1969, 1970, and 1971 European Formula Two Championship.

The Brabham BT30 used a complex tubular space frame and was powered by the FVA Cosworth engine. The large rear wings fitted in 1969 were replaced with smaller ones in 1970. The BT30 also had an aluminum fuel tank in 1969, which was replaced in 1970 by steel tanks integrated into the side panels of the monocoque.

In 1969 Piers Courage finished fifth in the BT30 of the Frank Williams Racing Cars team in the Formula 2 European Championship. Driving a privately entered BT30, Peter Westbury finished sixth overall at the end of the year, one place behind Courage. Additionally, Westbury entered the car to race in the 1969 European Formula 5000 Championship.

In 1970 the BT30 was the most used car in the Formula 2 championship. Of the 40 drivers who scored points in Formula 2 this season, 22 started with a BT30. Derek Bell was runner-up.

== Formula One World Championship results ==
Year	Entrant	Engine	Tyres	Drivers	1	2	3	4	5	6	7	8	9	10	11	Points	WCC
1969	Ahrens Racing Team	Ford Cosworth FVA 1.6 L4	D		RSA	ESP	MON	NED	FRA	GBR	GER	ITA	CAN	USA	MEX	—N/a	
1969	Ahrens Racing Team	Ford Cosworth FVA 1.6 L4	D	(West Germany) Kurt Ahrens							7					—N/a	
1969	Frank Williams Racing Cars	Ford Cosworth FVA 1.6 L4	D	(United Kingdom) Richard Attwood							6					—N/a	
1969	Felday Engineering Ltd.	Ford Cosworth FVA 1.6 L4	F	(United Kingdom) Peter Westbury							9					—N/a	
