= Lotus 69 =

Open-wheel formula racing car

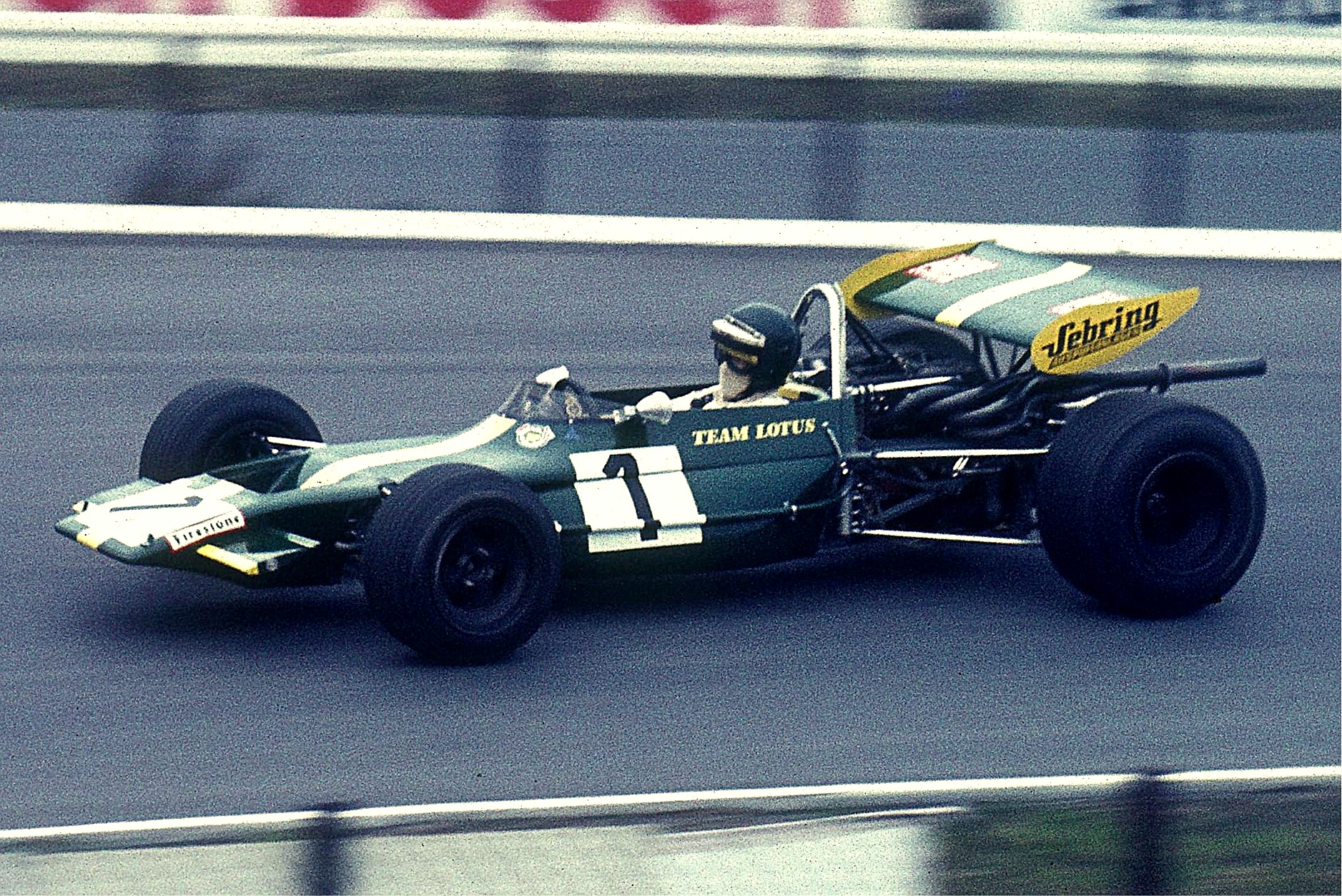
Jochen Rindt in a Lotus 69 in 1970

The Lotus 69 was an open-wheel formula racing car developed by Lotus in 1969 for use in Formula 2, Formula 3, and Formula Ford.

== Development ==
Since the Formula 2 regulations for 1970 provided for extensive changes to the vehicles, Dave Baldwin developed the Lotus 69 based on the Lotus 59 Formula 2 car.

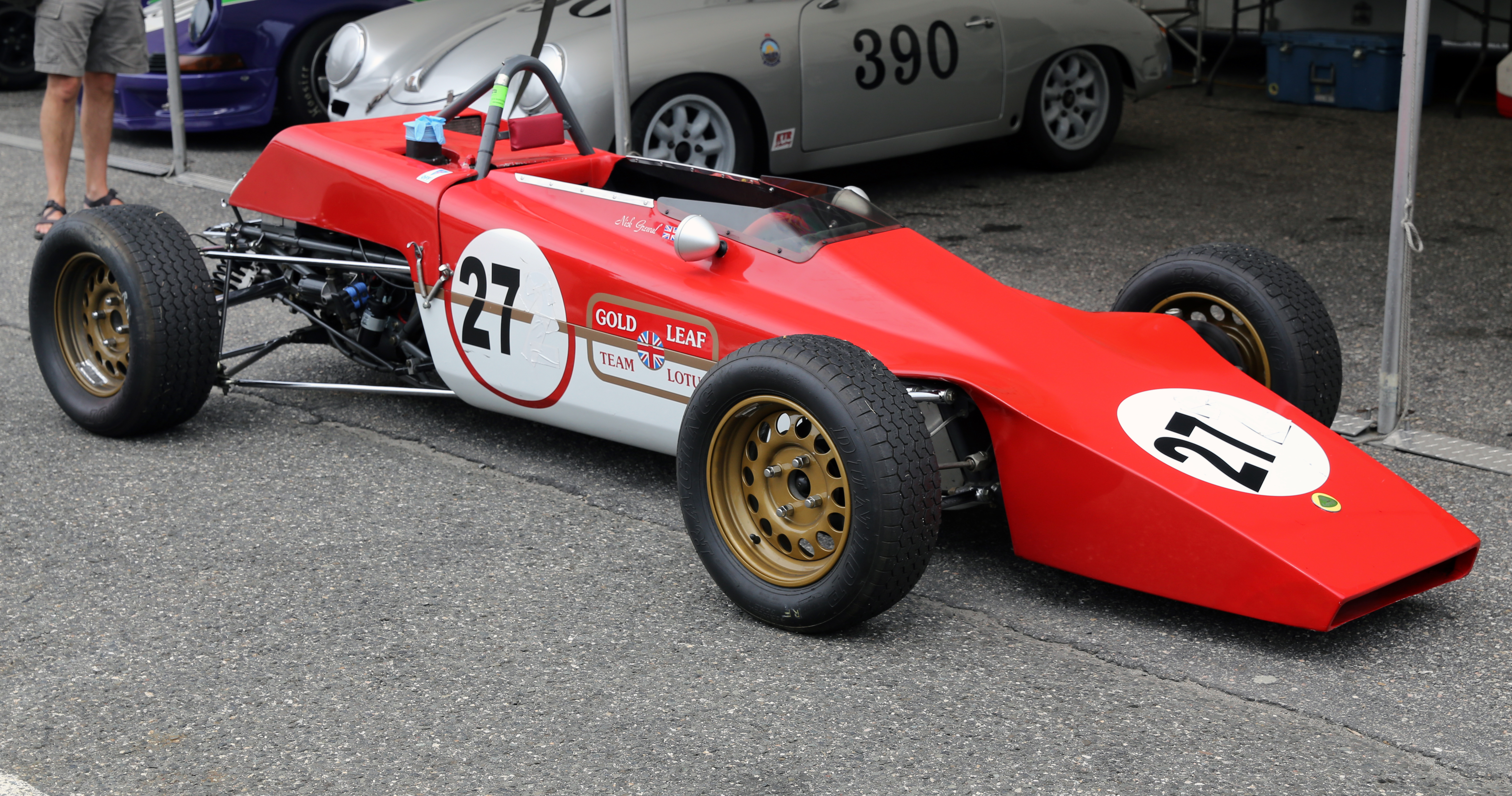
1969 Lotus 69 Formula Ford

He left the basic Lotus 59 construction untouched and only changed the central monocoque section, which contained the two fuel tanks. The chassis mounts have been modified and the front has been adapted to the new regulations to reduce the radiator inlet. Since only engines up to a maximum of 1600 cc were allowed in Formula 2 from 1967 to 1971, the car received a 1.6-liter Cosworth FVA four-cylinder engine and a Hewland F.T.200 gearbox.

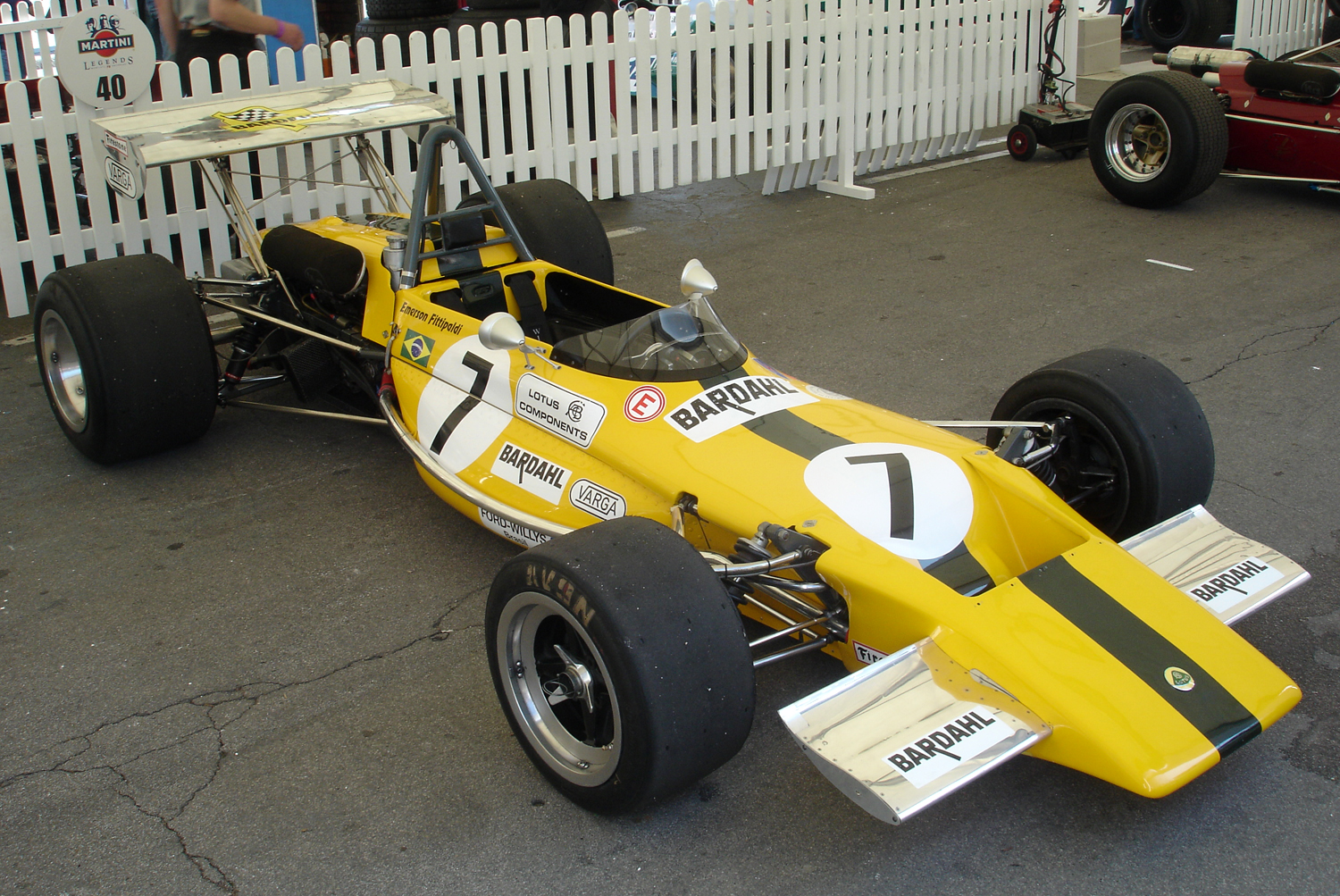
Lotus 69 of Emerson Fittipaldi

The basic vehicle construction was designed in such a way that by adding other suspensions and brakes, and by changing the body parts and the wheels, the Lotus 69 could be built into a Formula 3 or Formula B- compliant racing car.

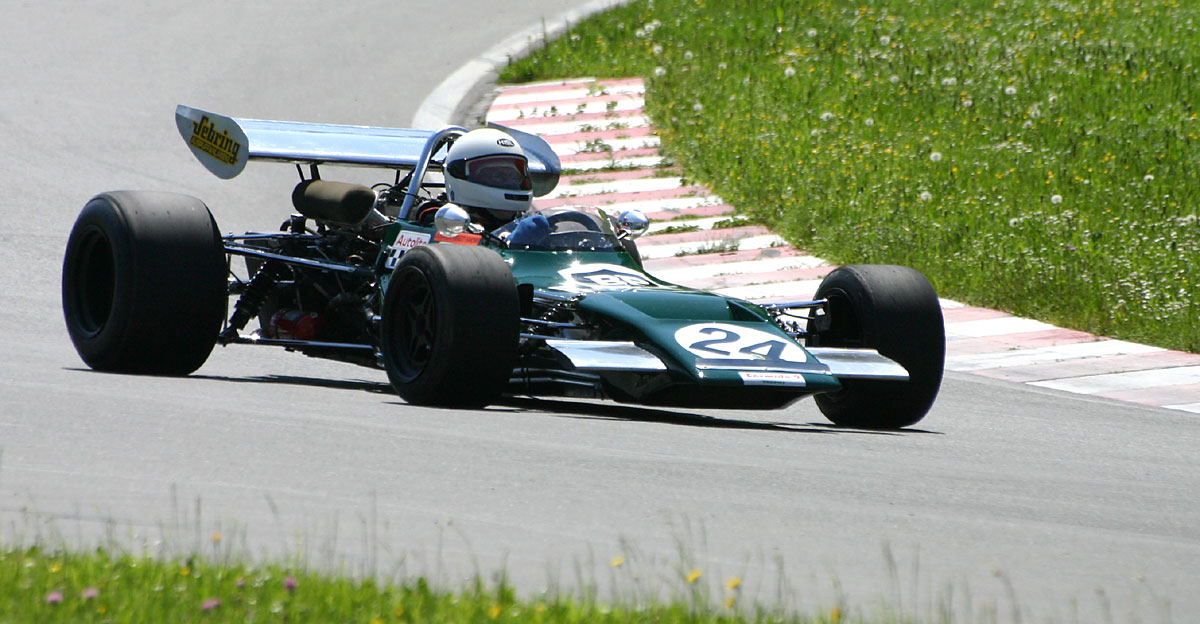
Lotus 69/2

With the increase in the displacement limit to 2000 cc in Formula 2, the racing cars were equipped with a Cosworth BDA engine in 1971.

The Lotus 69F was built to Formula Ford regulations and featured a space frame chassis with a modified front end and narrower wheels than the Formula 2 and Formula 3 variants. It was delivered with 1.6-liter Ford/Lotus engines.

A total of 57 racing cars were produced by the Lotus 69, of which eight cars were built for Formula 2.

A Formula 2 vehicle was purchased by Pete Lovely and briefly converted into a Formula 1 car. He used this in 1971 at the Canadian Grand Prix and the US Grand Prix without success.

The Lotus 69 was the last model developed and produced for customer use. In 1971 Colin Chapman closed Lotus Racing Ltd. and concentrated on Formula 1 motorsport with his works team.

== Achievements ==
Jochen Rindt won the first two races of the 1970 Formula 2 season with the Lotus 69 before concentrating on Formula One. The following year, Emerson Fittipaldi won five Formula 2 races with the car.

In the two British Formula 3 championships in 1971, Dave Walker won 25 out of a total of 32 races with the racing car and thus won the two championship titles.

== Complete Formula One results ==
(key)

Year	Entrant	Engine	Tyre	Driver	1	2	3	4	5	6	7	8	9	10	11	WCC Points	WCC Pos.
1971	Pete Lovely Volkswagen Inc.	Ford Cosworth DFV 3.0 V8	F	(United States) Pete Lovely	RSA	ESP	MON	NED	FRA	GBR	GER	AUT	ITA	CAN	USA	21*	5th*
1971	Pete Lovely Volkswagen Inc.	Ford Cosworth DFV 3.0 V8	F	(United States) Pete Lovely										NC	NC	21*	5th*

* All points scored by other Lotus models
