= 1969 British Grand Prix =

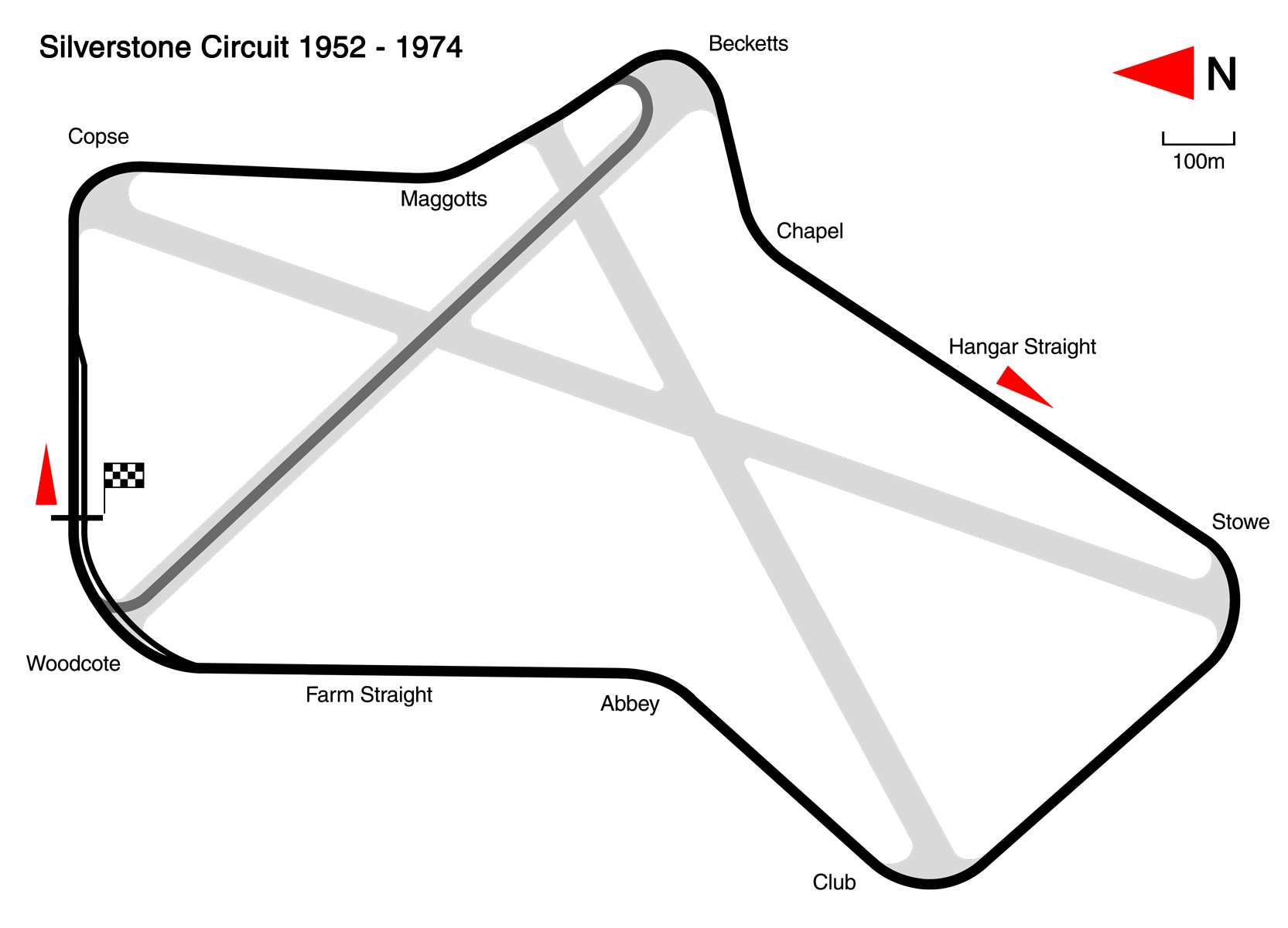
- The Silverstone Circuit (1952–1974)

Race details
- Date: 19 July 1969
- Official name: XXII RAC British Grand Prix
- Location: Silverstone Circuit, Northamptonshire and Buckinghamshire, England
- Course: Permanent racing facility
- Course length: 4.711 km (2.927 miles)
- Distance: 84 laps, 395.724 km (245.891 miles)
- Weather: Overcast, dry

Pole position
Driver	(Austria) Jochen Rindt	Lotus-Ford
- Time: 1:20.8

Fastest lap
Driver	(United Kingdom) Jackie Stewart	Matra-Ford
- Time: 1:21.3 on lap 57

Podium
First	(United Kingdom) Jackie Stewart	Matra-Ford
Second	(Belgium) Jacky Ickx	Brabham-Ford
Third	(New Zealand) Bruce McLaren	McLaren-Ford

The 1969 British Grand Prix was a Formula One motor race held at the Silverstone Circuit on 19 July 1969. It was race 6 of 11 in both the 1969 World Championship of Drivers and the 1969 International Cup for Formula One Manufacturers. Jackie Stewart was victorious, as he lapped the entire field and took his fifth win in six races.

The race developed as a contest between Stewart and Jochen Rindt who constantly overtook each other by slipstreaming. It was on one of these occasions towards the end when Stewart signalled to Rindt as he drew alongside that the end plate of his rear wing had come loose and was fouling the left-rear tyre each time Rindt flung his Lotus through a fast right-hander. Rindt was able to confirm this in his mirror and was forced to pit. However, his team failed to put enough fuel into the car to enable him to finish the race and consequently he was obliged to make a further stop. The race was also notable for being the only race that Cosworth entered. Their car was withdrawn weeks before the race weekend.

== Classification ==
=== Qualifying ===
Pos	No	Driver	Constructor	Time	Gap
1	2	(Austria) Jochen Rindt	Lotus-Ford	1:20.8	—
2	3	(United Kingdom) Jackie Stewart	Matra-Ford	1:21.2	+0.4
3	5	(New Zealand) Denny Hulme	McLaren-Ford	1:21.5	+0.7
4	7	(Belgium) Jacky Ickx	Brabham-Ford	1:21.6	+0.8
5	11	(New Zealand) Chris Amon	Ferrari	1:21.9	+1.1
6	14	(United Kingdom) John Surtees	BRM	1:22.1	+1.3
7	6	(New Zealand) Bruce McLaren	McLaren-Ford	1:22.6	+1.8
8	12	(Mexico) Pedro Rodríguez	Ferrari	1:22.6	+1.8
9	10	(Switzerland) Jo Siffert	Lotus-Ford	1:22.7	+1.9
10	16	(United Kingdom) Piers Courage	Brabham-Ford	1:22.9	+2.1
11	19	(United Kingdom) Vic Elford	McLaren-Ford	1:23.3	+2.5
12	1	(United Kingdom) Graham Hill	Lotus-Ford	1:23.6	+2.8
13	15	(United Kingdom) Jackie Oliver	BRM	1:23.7	+2.9
14	9	(United Kingdom) John Miles	Lotus-Ford	1:25.1	+4.3
15	20	(United Kingdom) Derek Bell	McLaren-Ford	1:26.1	+5.3
16	18	(Sweden) Jo Bonnier	Lotus-Ford	1:28.2	+7.4
17	4	(France) Jean-Pierre Beltoise	Matra-Ford	1:31.2	+10.4

=== Race ===
Pos	No	Driver	Constructor	Laps	Time/Retired	Grid	Points
1	3	(United Kingdom) Jackie Stewart	Matra-Ford	84	1:55:55.6	2	9
2	7	(Belgium) Jacky Ickx	Brabham-Ford	83	+ 1 Lap	4	6
3	6	(New Zealand) Bruce McLaren	McLaren-Ford	83	+ 1 Lap	7	4
4	2	(Austria) Jochen Rindt	Lotus-Ford	83	+ 1 Lap	1	3
5	16	(United Kingdom) Piers Courage	Brabham-Ford	83	+ 1 Lap	10	2
6	19	(United Kingdom) Vic Elford	McLaren-Ford	82	+ 2 Laps	11	1
7	1	(United Kingdom) Graham Hill	Lotus-Ford	82	+ 2 Laps	12	
8	10	(Switzerland) Jo Siffert	Lotus-Ford	81	+ 3 Laps	9	
9	4	(France) Jean-Pierre Beltoise	Matra-Ford	78	+ 6 Laps	17	
10	9	(United Kingdom) John Miles	Lotus-Ford	75	+ 9 Laps	14	
Ret	12	(Mexico) Pedro Rodríguez	Ferrari	61	Engine	8	
Ret	11	(New Zealand) Chris Amon	Ferrari	45	Gearbox	5	
Ret	5	(New Zealand) Denny Hulme	McLaren-Ford	27	Ignition	3	
Ret	15	(United Kingdom) Jackie Oliver	BRM	19	Transmission	13	
Ret	18	(Sweden) Jo Bonnier	Lotus-Ford	6	Engine	16	
Ret	20	(United Kingdom) Derek Bell	McLaren-Ford	5	Suspension	15	
Ret	14	(United Kingdom) John Surtees	BRM	1	Suspension	6	

== Championship standings after the race ==
Drivers' Championship standings

	Pos	Driver	Points
	1	(United Kingdom) Jackie Stewart	45
2	2	(New Zealand) Bruce McLaren	17
1	3	(United Kingdom) Graham Hill	16
1	4	(Switzerland) Jo Siffert	13
2	5	(Belgium) Jacky Ickx	13

Constructors' Championship standings

Pos	Constructor	Points
1	(France) Matra-Ford	45
2	(United Kingdom) Lotus-Ford	25
3	(United Kingdom) McLaren-Ford	20 (22)
4	(United Kingdom) Brabham-Ford	19
5	(Italy) Ferrari	4

- Note: Only the top five positions are included for both sets of standings. Only the best 5 results from the first 6 rounds and the best 4 results from the last 5 rounds counted towards the Championship. Numbers without parentheses are Championship points; numbers in parentheses are total points scored.

Previous race: 1969 French Grand Prix	FIA Formula One World Championship; 1969 season	Next race: 1969 German Grand Prix
Previous race: 1968 British Grand Prix	British Grand Prix	Next race: 1970 British Grand Prix
