= Robin Widdows =

British racing driver and bobsledder (born 1942)

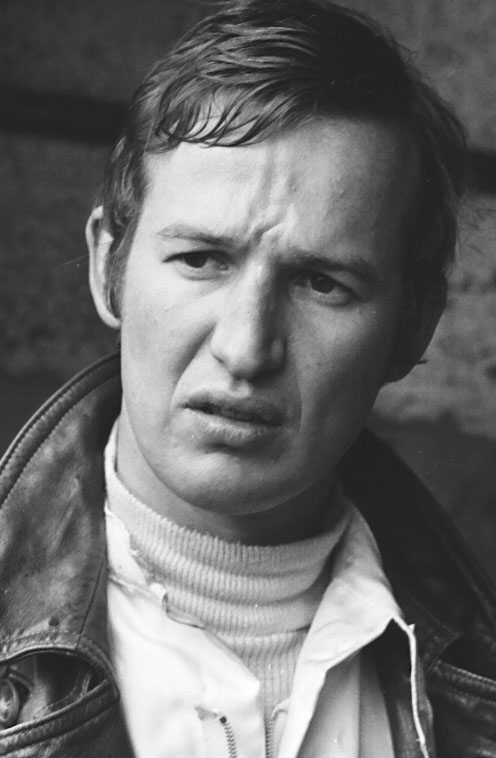
- Widdows in 1970
- Born: 27 May 1942 (age 84); Cowley, Middlesex, England

Formula One World Championship career
- Nationality: (United Kingdom) British
- Active years: 1968
- Team: Cooper
- Entries: 1
- Championships: 0
- Wins: 0
- Podiums: 0
- Career points: 0
- Pole positions: 0
- Fastest laps: 0
- First entry: 1968 British Grand Prix

Robin Michael Widdows (born 27 May 1942 in Cowley, Middlesex) is a British former racing driver from England. He participated in Formula One, Formula Two, Formula Three and sportscars including Le Mans.

Widdows began his career with an MG Midget and a Lotus 23 winning the Autosport Class C Championship in 1965. He moved to Formula Three the following year and in 1967 competed in Formula Two with a Brabham BT23, winning the Rhine Cup at Hockenheim. In 1968, Widdows joined The Chequered Flag team to compete in a McLaren M4A and that year took part in his only World Championship Grand Prix, for Cooper, in the British Grand Prix at Brands Hatch but retired with ignition problems. He returned to Formula Two the following season with Bob Gerard and also raced sportscars for Matra. Widdows continued in Formula Two in 1970, with a Brabham, but retired from the sport part way through the season.

Widdows holds the rare distinction of being one of a select group of six who have competed in both a Formula One World Championship race and the Olympic Games (bobsleigh in 1964 and 1968).

On 17 January 1965, Widdows became the fastest Englishman to ride the Cresta Run from Junction with a time of 44.14 secs, recorded in the Harjes Cartier Silver Chip handicap race.

== Complete Formula One World Championship results ==
(key)

Year	Entrant	Chassis	Engine	1	2	3	4	5	6	7	8	9	10	11	12	WDC	Points
1968	Cooper Car Company	Cooper T86B	BRM V12	RSA	ESP	MON	BEL	NED	FRA	GBR; Ret	GER	ITA	CAN	USA	MEX	NC	0
