= McLaren M4A =

1967 racing car

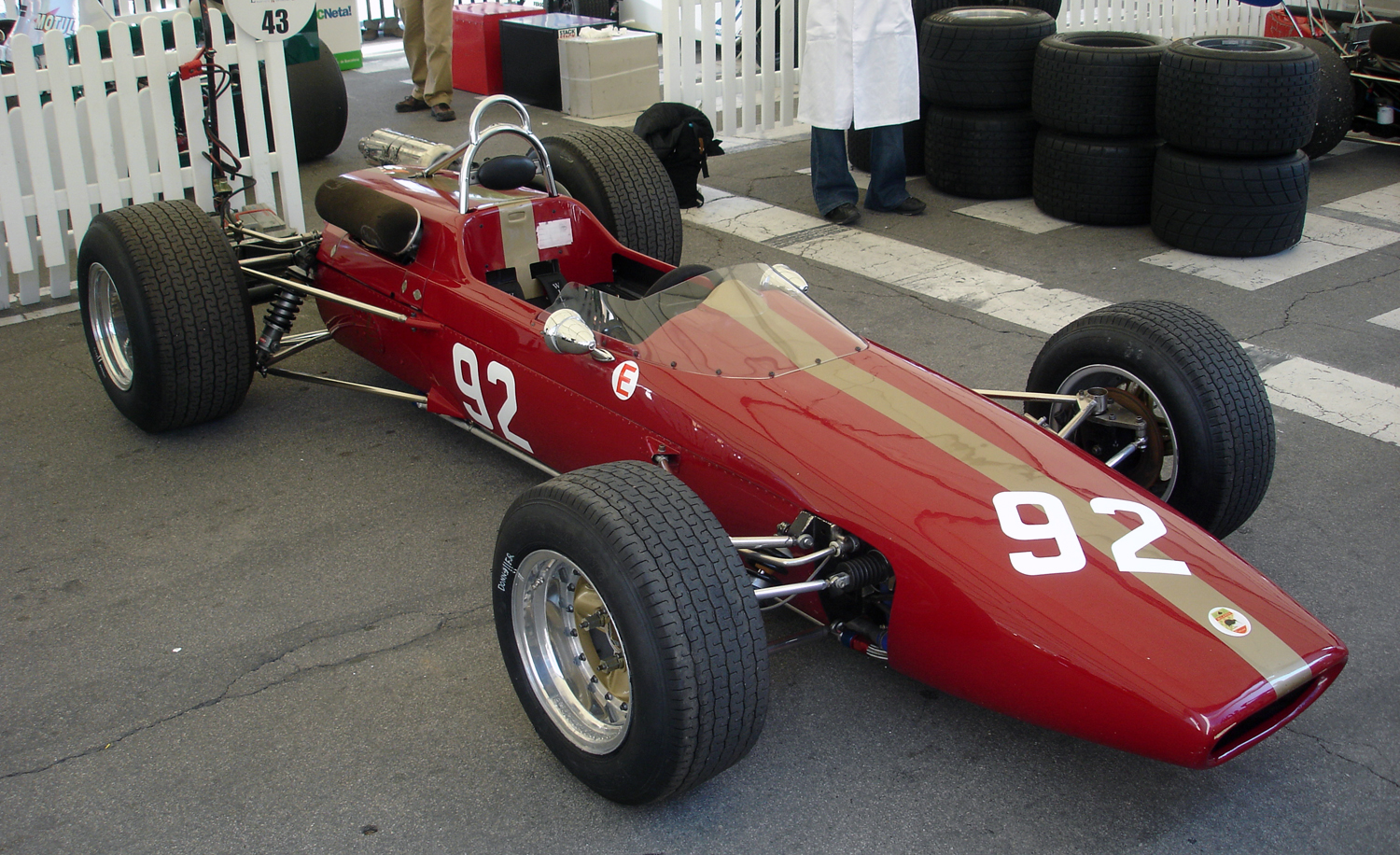
An M4A at the Martini Legends event

The McLaren M4A was an open-wheel racing car designed by Robin Herd and built by British Formula One team McLaren to compete in the European Formula Two Championship.

The M4A made its début in the 1967 European F2 Championship, and was powered by Ford Cosworth FVA engines. Two works cars were initially produced for use in the championship. Although the car was reasonably competitive in the series, it was not able to challenge the more capable Brabham BT23 or Lotus 48. Graeme Lawrence recalled that he and Frank Gardner, who both drove the car in the 1968 season, struggled to handle the M4A and that McLaren's focus was firmly on Formula One at the time, which explained why little development was done to the car from the 1967 version and teams were not offered much technical support. Customer M4As were run in the 1968 and 1969 Tasman Series. The M4A went on to be used in several other series, including various Formula Three series, Formula Libre, and the Australian Drivers' Championship.

Both the M4B and M5A Formula One cars were based on the M4A chassis.

Since its retirement from active development, the M4A has been used in a variety of historic motorsports. Historical racer Richard Griot recalled from his first drive of an M4A that "Nothing could touch it in a straight line."
