= Sena =

Sena may refer to:

== Places ==
- Sanandaj or Sena, city in northwestern Iran
- Sena (state constituency), represented in the Perlis State Legislative Assembly
- Sena, a Medieval Catalan exonym for Siena, Italy
- Sena, Dashtestan, village in Bushehr Province, Iran
- Sena, Huesca, municipality in Huesca province, Spain
- Sena (Ibias), a parish in the municipality of Ibias
- Sena, Iran, village in Bushehr Province, Iran
- Sena Jan, village in Gandoman Rural District
- Sena Madureira, municipality located in the center of the Brazilian state of Acre
- Sena, New Mexico, unincorporated community and census-designated place in New Mexico, United States
- Sena Nikhom, khwaeng (subdistrict) of Chatuchak district, Bangkok, Thailand
- Sena Oura National Park, protected area with national park status in Chad
- Sena, Yemen, ancient abandoned town in Hadhramaut, Yemen
- Sena (Kučevo), village in the municipality of Kučevo, Braničevo District, Serbia
- Seňa, village and municipality in the Kosice Region, Slovakia
- Vila de Sena or Sena, Mozambique

== People ==
=== Given name ===
- Sezgi Sena Akay (born 1994), Turkish actress
- Sena (footballer) (born 1978), football manager and former player
- Sena I, King of Anuradhapura in the 9th century
- Sena II, Sinhala King of Anuradhapura in the 9th century
- Sena III, King of Anuradhapura in the 10th century
- Sena IV, King of Anuradhapura in the 10th century
- Sena V, King of Anuradhapura in the 10th century
- Sena Acolatse (born 1990), American-Canadian professional ice hockey player
- Sena Can (born 2001), Turkish sport shooter
- Sena Elçin Karakaş (born 2004), Turkish trampoline gymnast
- Sena Hussain the lead singer of Secret Trial Five
- Sena Inami (井波 靖奈; born 1992), Japanese football player
- Sena Irie (入江 聖奈; born 2000), Japanese retired amateur boxer
- Sena Jeter Naslund (born 1942), American writer
- Sena Jurinac (1921–2011), Bosnian-born Austrian operatic soprano
- Sena Kana, Japanese pop singer
- Sena Mahesh Patel, Indian politician from Madhya Pradesh
- Sena Miyake (三宅 星南; born 2002), Japanese figure skater
- Sena Moon, South Korean writer and translator
- Sena Nanayakkara, Sri Lankan politician and academic
- Sena Nhavi, Indian saint-poet of the Varkari
- Sena Nur Çelik, Turkish politician
- Sena Pavetić, Croatian female basketball player
- Sena Ralte (born 1988), Indian professional footballer
- Sena Sakaguchi (阪口 晴南; born 1999), Japanese racing driver
- Sena Suzuki (鈴木 世奈; born 1991), Japanese ice hockey player
- Sena Takahashi (高橋 星名; born 2010), Japanese figure skater
- Sena Takano (髙野 芹奈; born 1998), Japanese sailor
- Sena Tomita (冨田 せな; born 1999), Japanese snowboarder
- Sena Yamada (山田 誓己; born 1994), Japanese Grand Prix motorcycle racer
- Yang Sena (양세나; born 1999), South Korean professional footballer
- Lady Tsukiyama also known as Sena (瀬名), Japanese samurai-class woman

=== Surname ===
- Balthasar Seña (1590–1614), Spanish Jesuit missionary
- Dominic Sena (born 1949), American film director
- Gemma Sena Chiesa (1929–2024), Italian archaeologist
- Jacinto Roque de Sena Pereira (1784–1850), Portuguese-born Brazilian sailor notable
- James Sena (born 1988), Filipino professional basketball player
- João Victor Alves Sena (born 2000), or Neguinho, Brazilian futsal player
- Jun Sena (瀬奈じゅん; born 1974), Japanese actress
- Maryam Sena, wife of Sarsa Dengel, the Emperor of Ethiopia
- Suzanne Sena (born 1963), American television host

== Fictional characters ==
- Robin Sena from Witch Hunter Robin
- Sena Kobayakawa from Eyeshield 21
- Sena Hayami from Mashin Sentai Kiramager
- Kaito Sena from Torture Princess: Fremd Torturchen
- Sena from Xenoblade Chronicles 3

== Films & television ==
- Sena (film), a 2003 Indian Tamil-language crime film
- Sena/Quina, la inmortalidad del cangrejo, a 2005 Bolivian film by Paolo Agazzi

== Other uses ==
- Sena (company), in Iceland
- Sena (wine), of Chile
- Sena dynasty, dynasty that ruled Bengal in the 11th and 12th centuries
- Sena and Guttika, Indian usurpers of the Anuradhapura throne in Sri Lanka
- Sena language, language in central Mozambique
- Sena Medal, awarded to members of the Indian Army
- Sena people, ethnic group of Mozambique and Malawi
- Sena (moth), a moth genus in the subfamily Lasiocampinae
- Sena railway, railway that connects Dondo, Mozambique, to Chipata, in Zambia
- Sena River, river of Bolivia

== See also ==
- SENA (disambiguation)
- Senna (disambiguation)
- Sina (disambiguation)
- Seena, 2009 Indian Kannada-language film by Basavaraj Bellary
- Amphoe Sena, district in Ayutthaya Province, Thailand
- Bangladesh Senabahini, the native name of the Bangladeshi Army
- Bharatiya Sena, the native name of the Indian Army
- Nepali Sena, the native name of the Nepalese Army
- Saena, city in Tuscany, Italy
- Sena de Luna, municipality in León province, Spain
- Senigallia, formerly Sena Gallica, Ancona, Italy
- Shanti Sena or Peace army, made up of Gandhi's followers in India
- Shiv Sena, political party in India
