= Senna =

Senna may refer to:

== Individuals ==
- Ayrton Senna (1960–1994), Brazilian F1 driver
- Bruno Senna (born 1983), F1 driver and nephew of Ayrton
- Danzy Senna (born 1970), novelist
- Lorraine Senna, American film and television director
- Marcos Senna (born 1976), Brazilian-Spanish football player
- Márcio Senna (born 1981), Brazilian football player, brother of Marco
- Mohammad Ibrahim Abu Senna (born 1937), Egyptian poet
- Viviane Senna (born 1958), IAS president and sister of Ayrton
- Senna Agius (born 2005), motorcycle racer
- Senna Gammour (born 1979), German singer and member of Monrose
- Senna Proctor (born 1998), British racing driver
- Senna Ušić-Jogunica (born 1986), Croatian volleyball player

== Fictional characters ==
- Senna Galan, a character in the American action-drama TV series Matador. She is the daughter of Andrés Galan, one of the protagonists.
- Senna Refa, a character in the Babylon 5 novel Legions of Fire – Out of the Darkness. She is the daughter of Antono Refa
  - Senna is also the name of another, unrelated Centauri woman: the governess seen in Babylon 5: In the Beginning. She was an old retainer of House Jaddo.
- Senna Tōno, a character in the visual novel W Wish series.
- Senna Wales, a witch in the Everworld fantasy series for young adults by K. A. Applegate
- Senna, a character in the movie Bleach: Memories of Nobody
- Senna, a character in the League of Legends series

== Plants ==
- Senna (plant), a genus of legumes
- Formerly, plants in Cassia (genus) which used to include Senna
- Black senna the Scrophulariaceae genus Seymeria
- Bladder sennas, the legume genus Colutea
- Scorpion sennas, plants in the legume genera Coronilla and Hippocrepis

== Places ==
- Senna Comasco, a comune (municipality) in the province of Como in the Italian region Lombardy
- Senna Lodigiana, a comune (municipality) in the province of Lodi in the Italian region Lombardy
- Senna (Sihnah, Sihneh), a Kurdish city in western Iran, nowadays Sanandaj.

== Other ==
- Senna (poetic), an exchange of insults found in the Poetic Edda
- Senna (film), a 2010 documentary film about Ayrton Senna
- Senna (miniseries), a 2024 Netflix series about Ayrton Senna
- McLaren Senna, a British mid-engined sports car, honouring Ayrton Senna
- Senna glycoside, a laxative

== See also ==
- Avicenna – Persian polymath, physician and philosopher (c. 980–1037), also called Ibn Sina
- Sena (disambiguation)
- Siena (disambiguation)
- Sienna (disambiguation)
