= 2022–23 S.C. Covilhã season =

S.C. Covilhã
2022–23 season
- Chairman: José Oliveira Mendes
- Manager: Alex
- Stadium: Estádio Municipal José dos Santos Pinto
- Liga Portugal 2: 18th
- Taça de Portugal: Second round
- Taça da Liga: Group stage
- All statistics correct as of 29 January 2023.

The 2022–23 season is the 100th season in the history of S.C. Covilhã and their 15th consecutive season in the second division of Portuguese football. The club are participating in the Liga Portugal 2, the Taça de Portugal, and the Taça da Liga. The season covers the period from 1 July 2022 to 30 June 2023.

== Players ==
As of 6 January 2023

Note: Flags indicate national team as defined under FIFA eligibility rules; some limited exceptions apply. Players may hold more than one non-FIFA nationality.

No.	Pos.	Nation	Player
1	GK	POR	Igor Araújo
2	DF	POR	Diogo Rodrigues (on loan from Portimonense)
3	DF	BRA	Casagrande (on loan from Portimonense)
4	DF	GHA	Mohammed Adams
5	MF	KOR	Yang Sena
7	FW	CPV	Kukula
8	MF	POR	Gilberto Silva
10	MF	POR	Zé Tiago
11	MF	POR	Jorginho
12	MF	BRA	Felipe Dini (on loan from Portimonense)
13	DF	FRA	Seydine N'Diaye
14	DF	POR	Jaime Simões
16	MF	POR	Diogo Cornélio
17	DF	POR	Rúben Ferreira

No.	Pos.	Nation	Player
18	FW	ARG	Agustín Marsico
19	FW	COL	Wilinton Aponzá (on loan from Portimonense)
20	DF	POR	Tiago Moreira
21	FW	BRA	Guilherme Beléa
22	FW	MOZ	Gildo
23	FW	POR	Nuno Rodrigues
24	GK	POR	Bruno Bolas
25	DF	POR	Tiago Lopes
30	FW	SEN	Fabrice Tamba
33	DF	POR	Ângelo Meneses
42	MF	GBS	Safrai
45	FW	NGR	Sodiq Fatai
92	GK	POR	Vítor São Bento

== Pre-season and friendlies ==
Win Draw Loss Fixtures

July 2022 Friendly	Sporting da Covilhã (Portugal)	–	(Portugal)	TBD
10:00 WEST (UTC+1)

== Competitions ==
=== Overall record ===
Competition	First match	Last match	Starting round	Final position	Record							
Competition	First match	Last match	Starting round	Final position	Pld	W	D	L	GF	GA	GD	Win %
Liga Portugal 2	6 August 2022	May 2023	Matchday 1		18	1	5	12	13	33	−20	5.56
Taça de Portugal	1 October 2022		Second round	Second round	1	0	0	1	0	3	−3	0.00
Taça da Liga	20 November 2022	14 December 2022	Group stage	Group stage	3	0	1	2	3	6	−3	0.00
Total					22	1	6	15	16	42	−26	4.55

Last updated: 29 January 2023
Source: Soccerway

=== Liga Portugal 2 ===
==== League table ====
Pos	Team	Pld	W	D	L	GF	GA	GD	Pts	Promotion or relegation
14	Benfica B (I)	34	10	8	16	52	58	−6	38 (Note: Benfica B are ahead of Leixões on head-to-head points: Benfica B 2–1 Leixões, Leixões 1–1 Benfica B. Leixões were deducted 1 point for financial irregularities.)	
15	Leixões	34	10	9	15	38	49	−11	38	
16	B-SAD (R)	34	9	8	17	41	59	−18	35	Qualification to Relegation play-offs
17	Trofense (R)	34	8	8	18	31	51	−20	32	Relegation to Liga 3
18	Sporting da Covilhã (R)	34	7	7	20	31	57	−26	28	Relegation to Liga 3

Updated to match(es) played on 28 May 2023. Source: Liga Portugal 2
Rules for classification: 1) Points; 2) Head-to-head points; 3) Head-to-head goal difference; 4) Head-to-head away goals scored; 5) Goal difference; 6) Matches won; 7) Goals scored; 8) Play-off.
(I) Ineligible for promotion; (R) Relegated

==== Results summary ====
Overall								Home						Away					
Pld	W	D	L	GF	GA	GD	Pts	W	D	L	GF	GA	GD	W	D	L	GF	GA	GD
0	0	0	0	0	0	0	0	0	0	0	0	0	0	0	0	0	0	0	0

Last updated: August 2022.
Source: Liga Portugal

==== Results by round ====
Round	1
Ground	
Result	
Position	

Updated to match(es) played on August 2022. Source: Liga Portugal
A = Away; H = Home; W = Win; D = Draw; L = Loss

==== Matches ====
The league fixtures were announced on 5 July 2022.
