= Siena (disambiguation) =

Siena is a city in Italy, and the capital of the Province of Siena.

Siena may also refer to:

== Education ==
=== Australia ===
- Siena Catholic College, Sippy Downs, Queensland
- Siena College (Camberwell), Melbourne, Victoria

=== Philippines ===
- Siena College of Quezon City in the Philippines
- Siena College of Taytay, Rizal, Philippines

=== United States ===
- Siena College, Loudonville, New York
  - Siena College Research Institute
- Siena College (Memphis, Tennessee), a former college in Tennessee
- Siena Heights University, Adrian, Michigan
- Siena School, Silver Spring, Maryland

== People ==
- Eugenio Siena (1905–1938), Italian racing driver
- Siena Agudong (born 2004), American actress

=== Fictional ===
- Siena (Hannah Montana), a character in the TV series Hannah Montana
- Siena Blaze, a fictional mutant in the Marvel Universe

== Sports ==
- Montepaschi Siena, a professional Basket League A Series basketball club from Siena, Tuscany, Italy
- Robur Siena, an Italian football club from Siena, Tuscany, Italy
- Siena Baseball Field, a baseball venue in Loudonville, New York, United States

== Transportation ==
- Fiat Siena, an Italian compact sedan
- Siena–Ampugnano Airport, a former military airfield near Siena, Tuscany, Italy
- Siena railway station, a railway station in Siena, Italy

== Other ==
- Siena Cathedral, a medieval church in Siena, Tuscany, Italy
- Siena Reno, a hotel in Reno, Nevada, United States
- 51st Infantry Division Siena, an infantry division of Italy during World War II
- Epyc Siena, codename for a series of server CPUs from AMD

== See also ==
- Sienna (disambiguation)
- Siena College (disambiguation)
