= Senninha =

Brazilian comic book series

Senninha is a Brazilian comic book series created by Rogério Martins and Ridaut Dias Jr., whose main character is based upon Formula One world champion Ayrton Senna.

Senninha was launched on 28 January 1994 by the publisher Abril, some months before the accident that caused Senna's death. After Senna's death, the comics became very popular and remained this way until 1999, when Brainstore began to publish the comics. However, the series was cancelled in 2000 after only a few new issues. In 2008 the comic was restarted by the publisher HQM, but due to poor sales and poor marketing it was cancelled again.

All profits from licensing of the character went to the Instituto Ayrton Senna.

== Characters ==
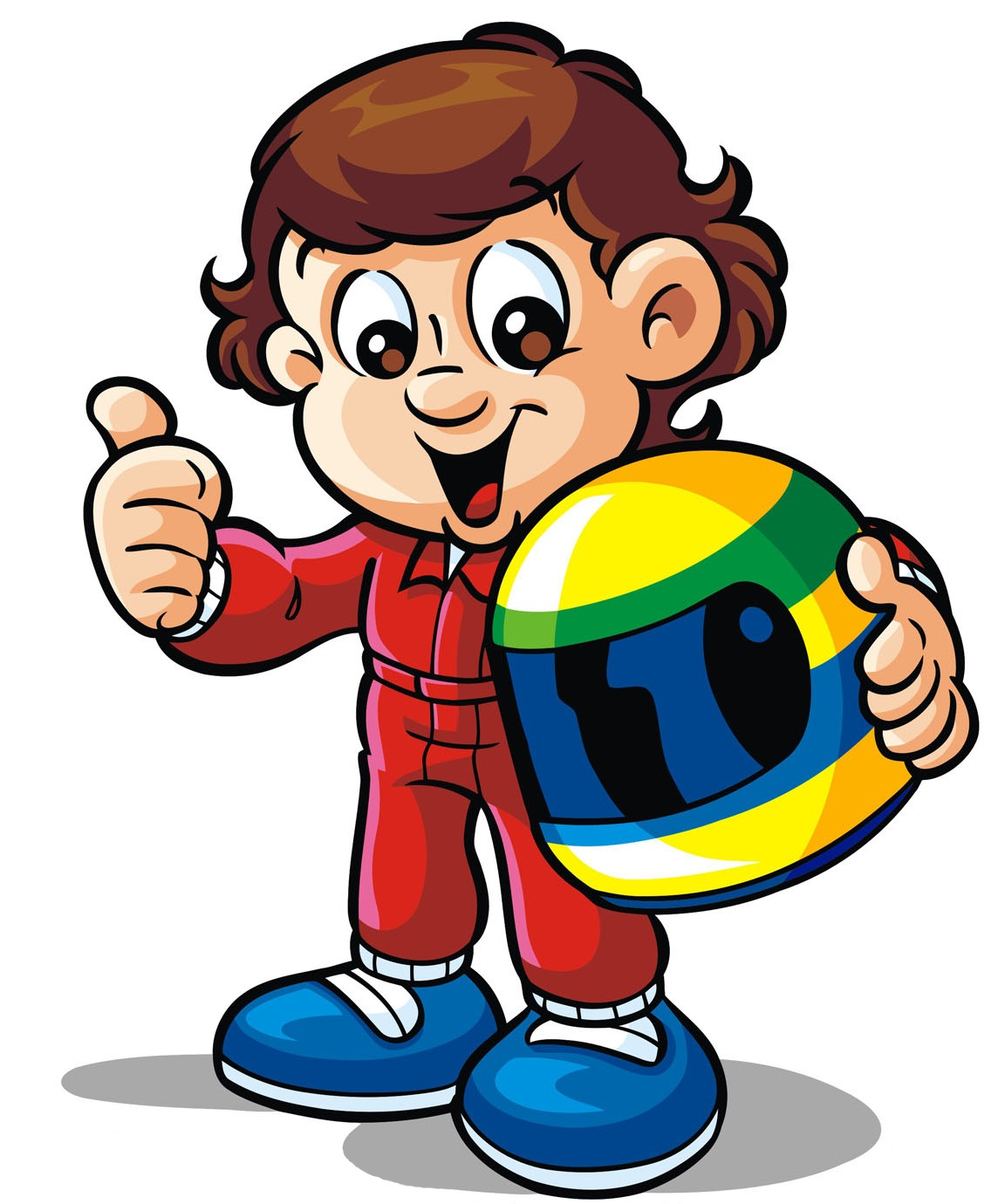
Senninha

- Senninha (lit. "Little Senna"), is the main character of the series, with characteristics very similar to Ayrton Senna, including unruly hair, a bulbous nose and red overalls (like the McLaren team for which Senna was best known), as well as being friendly, determined and sometimes rushed. He is eight years old. During the initial run, he wore a blue jumpsuit (like the Williams team that Senna was driving for at the time of the character's creation) and a simple helmet. In issue #10 his helmet became a magical character called Meu Herói.
- Meu Herói (lit. "My Hero"), is the magical helmet of Senninha, colored green, yellow and blue like Senna's helmet (which was predominantly yellow, with one green and one blue horizontal stripe.) To most other people it is a normal helmet and only magical entities and persons as special as Senninha (such as Juan Manuel Fangio, who made a posthumous appearance in the comics in 1995) can see and hear it. Meu Herói was present only in the first series of comics published in the 90s, being inexplicably absent in later comics and animations.
- Neco Chong is the mechanical inventor of the group. He is of Chinese descent and the twin brother of Coni. He is eight years old. Until issue #9 he was called Nico.
- Gabi is an artist and the sensitive member of the group. She is eight years old.
- Becão and Bicão are Senninha's twin helmet-wearing sheepdogs. Becão's helmet is blue with a white band and he thinks and acts like a human. Bicão's helmet is white with a blue stripe and he acts like any other ordinary dog, making a mess wherever he goes.
- Johnny is the heartthrob of the group and good at designing racing cars. He is ten years old.
- Tala Larga is the reporter in the group, who always records the racers with his camera, and often tries to interview Senninha, of whom he is a big fan. He is eight years old. The character was inspired by Galvão Bueno.
- Déia is the detective in the group. She is eight years old.
- Coni Chong Neco's twin sister and the "economist" of the group. She is eight years old.
- Marcha Lenta, whose name means "idle", is often shown sleeping. When awake, he normally interacts with Tala, as his cameraman. He is eight years old.
- JJ is crazy about basketball and computer science, as well as a top student in his class. He is the only black character in the group. He is ten years old.
- Téo is the younger brother of Senninha and can be a brat. He often annoys Johnny, who does not like him very much. He is six years old. The character was Inspired by Ayrton Senna's younger brother Leonardo.
- Gigi is the older sister of Senninha. She loves to talk on the phone. She is thirteen years old. The character was inspired by Viviane Senna, Ayrton Senna's older sister. Like Meu Herói, Gigi was present only in the first series of comics published in the 90s, being inexplicably absent in later comics and animations.
- Braço Duro is the leader of a rival gang to Senninha's group. He is always trying to win races and usually cheats. He hates losing to Senninha. He is nine years old. The character was inspired by Senna's rival Formula One drivers Alain Prost and Michael Schumacher. His name (literally "hard arm") comes from a Brazilian slang for bad drivers.
- Rebimboca is the mechanic of Braço's gang. He always copies Johnny's original ideas of cars design. He is nine years old.
- Bate-Pino has a stutter and always takes a long time to complete a sentence. He is ten years old.
- Pé-de-Breque is a big, fat member of Braço's gang and the typical dim-witted comic relief character. He is eleven years old.
- Tamborim is a purple mongrel cat and the mascot of Braço's gang.

== History ==
Senninha was designed by Rogerio Martins Jr and Ridaut Days in 1994. The pair was looking to publish the character but were low on money. They met with Ayrton Senna who suggested the design be based on himself.

The character was launched on 28 January 1994, when Ayrton Senna announced the project in order to pass on some of his values to Brazilian children (and also to face Turma da Mônica), and the first publication was on 27 February 1994. It was published by Editora Abril and made available free to every school in Brazil. The publications of the character transferred to Brainstore in 2000 before being cancelled later that year. The comics were also sold in various bookstores in Europe. Senninha returned in 2008 with new publishers HQM Publisher. All of the sales of Senninha contribute to the Instituto Ayrton Senna.

=== Merchandising ===
Senninha's name has been used on more than 370 products ranging from shirts to helicopters. A brand of eyewear created by the House of Watchmakers under Senninha's name is aimed at children under the age of twelve.

=== Video game adaption ===
DiverBras Entertainment developed a Senninha licensed racing arcade game entitled Senninha GP in 2008. The game was developed in Brazil by a team of 25 developers. It was first released in São Paulo and Rio de Janeiro.

=== Cartoon ===
Between the 1990s and 2000s several commercial animations and some short films were developed.

In 2015 a cartoon series of short episodes, "Zupt com o Senninha", was aired on educational channels such as Discovery Kids and TV Cultura. In 2018 a cartoon series called "Senninha na Pista Maluca" debuted on the children's channel Gloobinho.

From July 24, 2021, the web-series Gameventura com o Senninha (or Gameventura) debuted on the character's YouTube channel. With episodes lasting between 8 and 9 minutes, children watch the cartoon, but are also invited to participate in the plot, through a game where they must perform a series of physical movements to help the protagonists in the most exciting moments of the story. In each episode, Senninha and Teo (his younger brother) get into action creating super funny versions of fables and well-known heroes, such as Little Red Riding Hood, Rapunzel, Batman and Star Wars.
