= Siena College (disambiguation) =

Siena College may refer to:

== Australia ==
- Siena Catholic College in Queensland
- Siena College (Camberwell) in Victoria

== India ==
- Siena College Of Professional Studies, Edacochin

== Siena College of Taytay in Rizal province ==
- Siena College of Quezon City

== United States ==
- Siena College (New York)
- Siena College (Tennessee)

== See also ==
- Siena University
