= Sienna (disambiguation) =

Sienna is a clay used in making pigments, and a color.

Sienna may also refer to:

== Businesses and organizations ==
- Sienna Senior Living, a Canadian senior housing company

== Places ==
=== Italy ===
- Sienna, an alternative spelling of Siena, a city historically notable for production of the pigment and the origin of the name

=== Poland ===
- Sienna, Lesser Poland Voivodeship
- Sienna, Lower Silesian Voivodeship
- Sienna, Silesian Voivodeship
- Sienna Street, Kraków

=== United States ===
- Sienna, Texas

== People ==
- Sienna (given name)
- Sienna (wrestler), the ring name of Allysin Kay (born 1987), an American professional wrestler
- Pedro Sienna (1893-1972), Chilean writer and actor
- Brent Sienna, a character in PvP
- Noam Sienna, author and Jewish educator

== Other ==
- Sienna (album), a 1989 album by keyboardist Stanley Cowell
- "Sienna" (song), a 2024 song by The Marías
- Toyota Sienna, a minivan
- Sienna, a style of handbag sold by Kooba

== See also ==
- Siena (disambiguation)
