= Carolyn Mahoney =

American mathematician

18th President of Lincoln University of Missouri
- In office 2005–2012

Personal details
- Born: 1946 (age 79–80) Memphis, Tennessee, U.S.
- Education: Siena College (B.S.); Ohio State University (M.S., Ph.D)

Carolyn Ray Boone Mahoney (born 1946) is an American mathematician who served as president of Lincoln University of Missouri. Her research interests include combinatorics, graph theory, and matroids.

== Early life and education ==
Carolyn Mahoney was born the sixth of thirteen children in 1946 in Memphis, Tennessee, to Stephen and Myrtle Boone. Her grandmother cared for the children while her mother worked. Mahoney attended Catholic schools, where she was encouraged in her interest in mathematics by the nuns. As a teenager, Mahoney's parents separated due to her father's drinking and gambling and the family was forced to move to a lower-class neighborhood.

Mahoney and her siblings were known for being smart in their neighborhood. She graduated from Father Bertrand High School in 1964.

Mahoney attended Mount St. Scholastica College, a Catholic, all-female college in Kansas for three years before finishing her degree in mathematics at Siena College in Memphis, Tennessee in 1970. She then earned her master's degree in mathematics in 1972 and a doctorate in 1983, both from Ohio State University. Her doctorate involved matroid theory and enumerative combinatorics, and was supervised by Thomas Allan Dowling. She was the 25th black woman to earn a Ph.D. in mathematics in the U.S.

== Career ==
After earning her doctorate, Mahoney taught first at Denison University from 1984 to 1989, and Ohio State for two years. She also served on the test development committee for the College Board from 1986 to 1989. In 1989, Mahoney was the first mathematician to be selected for the faculty at California State University San Marcos, and was one of twelve founding faculty of the San Marcos campus.

In 1994 and 1995, Mahoney served as a program director at the National Science Foundation, and she later worked as an administrator at Elizabeth City State University in North Carolina. In 2005, Mahoney was named president of Lincoln University of Missouri. She retired in 2012.

== Contributions ==
Mahoney's research has focused largely on open problems in graph theory and combinatorics. As well as her thesis work on matroids, she has also published research on the Hadwiger–Nelson problem concerning the chromatic number of unit distance graphs.

She believes that she has had a hard time finding collaborators due to the fact that she is a Black female in mathematics. She is also a proponent of educational reform, especially supporting cultural diversity in university faculty. She believes that through the efforts of organizations such as the Mathematical Association of America and the Association for Women in Mathematics the environment for women in mathematics has improved.

== Awards and honors ==
In 1989, Mahoney was inducted into the Ohio Women's Hall of Fame.

A scholarship at CSU San Marcos and a walking trail at Lincoln University have been named in her honor.

Mahoney was also recognized by Mathematically Gifted & Black as a Black History Month 2018 Honoree.
