= Grand Prix Drivers' Association =

Trade union of Formula One drivers

- Formation: formed: 11 May 1961 disbanded: (February) 1982 reformed: (13) May 1994
- Headquarters: Monaco
- Chairman: (Austria) Alexander Wurz
- Directors: (United Kingdom) Anastasia Fowle; (United Kingdom) George Russell; (Spain) Carlos Sainz Jr.

The Grand Prix Drivers' Association (GPDA) is a trade union for Formula One drivers. Founded in 1961 and refounded in 1994, it has organised several drivers' strikes and boycotts over the years, primarily in response to unsafe circuits on the F1 calendar and other driver safety issues. It represents the international cast of F1 drivers but is based in Monaco. Its current chairman is a former driver Alexander Wurz.

== Background ==
=== First GPDA ===
The GPDA was founded in May 1961 and, following an election by members, its inaugural Chairman was Stirling Moss. After Moss retired from the sport in 1963, Jo Bonnier succeeded him.

The organisation's initial aim was to obtain representation on the Commission Sportive Internationale (CSI) of the Fédération Internationale de l'Automobile (FIA) to advocate for improved safety standards and provisions for both drivers and spectators. The GPDA organised driver boycotts of the Circuit de Spa-Francorchamps (1969) and the Nürburgring (1970, post-1976).

The organisation fractured during the FISA–FOCA war, during which drivers in teams aligned with FISA (mostly auto manufacturer teams like Ferrari) clashed with drivers in FOCA teams (mostly private racing teams like Lotus, McLaren, or Williams). GPDA chairman Jody Scheckter, a Ferrari driver, used his GPDA role to take FISA's side in the conflict, arguing that ground effect cars (pioneered by the FOCA teams) were unsafe for drivers. In response, several drivers for FOCA teams, including Williams' Alan Jones and Brabham's Nelson Piquet, resigned from the GPDA, and Lotus' Mario Andretti publicly suggested that FISA president Jean-Marie Balestre was no longer fit for the job.

In addition, the GPDA organised a successful drivers' strike at the 1982 South African Grand Prix after FISA proposed new regulations that gave them wider grounds to strip drivers of their FIA Super Licenses, although in that case, FOCA agreed with FISA's position. The drivers defeated the regulations but were fined and sanctioned by the FIA. Following the strike, a number of drivers met to disband the GPDA and replace it with the Professional Racing Drivers Association (PRDA), which theoretically extended to all professional drivers. The PRDA never matched the prominence or effectiveness of the original GPDA, and was said to have "faded away."

=== Second GPDA ===
Ahead of the 1994 season, the FIA banned electronic driver aids such as active suspension and traction control. The speed of the change (the FIA was so eager to implement the ban that it initially suggested imposing the ban in the middle of the 1993 season) was criticised by several drivers, who believed that it would lead to unsafe design flaws in the 1994 cars. Williams' Ayrton Senna publicly complained that the 1994 cars were less safe and predicted "lots of accidents," and McLaren's Martin Brundle claimed that because of the rushed nature of the changes, the drivers had "less control of the car" than in years past.

Ahead of the 1994 San Marino Grand Prix, Senna proposed reorganising the GPDA to give the drivers a unified voice in support of safety reforms. However, Senna and Roland Ratzenberger were both killed by on-track accidents during that race weekend.

Before the following race, the 1994 Monaco Grand Prix, Niki Lauda, Christian Fittipaldi, Michael Schumacher, and Gerhard Berger re-established the GPDA, with assistance from Martin Brundle. In its early days, the GPDA was opposed by FIA president Max Mosley, who claimed that non-drivers were interfering with the organisation.

In 1996, the GPDA was incorporated as a UK company limited by guarantee ("Grand Prix Drivers Association Ltd"). For the first time, the association had a formal corporate constitution and permanent offices in Monaco. The first directors of the incorporated GPDA were Brundle, Schumacher, and Berger.

== Driver safety initiatives ==
Since 1994, the GPDA's primary mission has been to improve safety on track. The GPDA threatened to boycott the 2013 German Grand Prix after a series of dangerous tyre blowouts at the British Grand Prix. The GPDA also pushed for stricter safety regulations at private team testing sessions, an area that the FIA traditionally did not regulate. In 2006, Williams' Alexander Wurz, a future GPDA chairman, said that the GPDA's safety push had helped cut the drivers' casualty insurance premiums by nearly half.

=== Aftermath of the 1994 San Marino Grand Prix ===
Following Ayrton Senna and Roland Ratzenberger's deaths at the 1994 San Marino Grand Prix, the reformed GPDA asked the FIA to limit speeds in dangerous areas and improve safety technology. For example, during the 1994 season, temporary chicanes were installed at the Circuit de Barcelona-Catalunya's Nissan corner and the Circuit de Spa-Francorchamps' Eau Rouge/Raidillon complex. In addition, a pit lane speed limit was introduced, and tracks were revised to provide larger run-off areas at the most dangerous corners.

=== 2005 tyre war controversy ===
In 2005, Michelin belatedly realised that its tyres could not handle the Indianapolis Motor Speedway's steeply banked Turn 13, prompting the teams with Michelin tyre contracts to drop out of the United States Grand Prix. Ferrari, which had a Bridgestone tyre contract, participated and won the race. Following the race, the FIA sought to punish the Michelin teams for dropping out. In response, the drivers for the Michelin-supplied teams issued a statement arguing that their teams acted appropriately to protect their drivers' safety. However, the GPDA chairman, Ferrari's Michael Schumacher (who won the race), publicly opposed the statement and denied that the GPDA was involved in the statement. Complicating matters, Jarno Trulli (the polesitter, who was forced to drop out) contradicted Schumacher and characterised the statement as a GPDA statement.

Later that year, FIA president Max Mosley cancelled a meeting with the GPDA, purportedly in retaliation for statements made by the GPDA's David Coulthard. The meeting was reportedly calendared to discuss the Michelin tyre dispute and proposed safety measures at F1 teams' private test sessions. Mosley claimed Coulthard's statements to the media were a "distortion" of the purpose of the meeting and accused him of stirring up dissent. In response, the GPDA stated that Mosley had threatened to withdraw his support for the GPDA's safety initiatives.

=== Aftermath of the 2014 Japanese Grand Prix ===
Jules Bianchi was fatally injured at the 2014 Japanese Grand Prix and died after several months in a coma. Following his death, the GPDA issued a statement saying that it felt a responsibility "to never relent in improving safety." The GPDA participated in the FIA's official review of the events of the Japanese GP. It also encouraged new safety reforms, including the "halo" cockpit protection device, which Formula One (and some drivers) initially resisted.

=== 2022 Saudi Arabian Grand Prix ===
During the weekend of the 2022 Saudi Arabian Grand Prix, the GPDA held a four-hour meeting to discuss multiple missile attacks in the Jeddah region, some as close as 10km from the Jeddah Corniche Circuit. After discussing the issue with Saudi government officials and FIA regulators, it eventually issued a statement confirming that the drivers would participate, despite their "natural concerns" about driver and team safety.

== Other activities ==
Under the leadership of Alexander Wurz (who became the GPDA chairman in 2014), the organisation grew "increasingly proactive in looking beyond [solely driver safety] to a more holistic bigger picture" about the structure and governance of the sport. In 2023, director George Russell explained that the GPDA was broadly concerned with three main topics: driver safety, "on-track entertainment," and "how it feels to drive the cars", although he subsequently noted that the role had grown unexpectedly political.

=== Racing regulations ===
In 2017, following Liberty Media's purchase of the Formula One Group, the GPDA sent Liberty a letter encouraging it to revise F1's sporting regulations to encourage closer racing. Wurz explained that "we all love one great natural overtaking much more than ten or more DRS overtakes." However, he also credited Ross Brawn and Pat Symonds with helping push for new regulations, which debuted in 2022. Motor Sport had previously noted that the drivers almost unanimously criticised regulation changes rolled out before the 2017 season, which they felt "will make overtaking even more difficult than it actually is."

=== Sporting governance ===
The GPDA became increasingly critical of Bernie Ecclestone's leadership during his final years in charge of Formula One. In 2015, the GPDA and Motorsport.com jointly organised a fan survey, which Wurz interpreted as saying that the fans (like him) "do not want [Formula One] to become an artificial show with gimmicks introduced to simply make it more entertaining". He added that "F1's business has become too important, jeopardising our sport." In 2016, following changes to the qualifying system, the GPDA released a statement calling F1's decision making "obsolete" and "ill-structured". The GPDA believed that the decision making could "jeopardise F1's future success." Ecclestone angrily dismissed the GPDA's statement, saying that the drivers were "only saying what their teams have told them to say" and that they had no right to a say in F1 decisions because they had never invested money into the sport.

In November 2024, the GPDA released a public statement outlining several grievances against the FIA including the issue of drivers swearing during races, the tone and language of the FIA President (Mohammed Ben Sulayem) in public statements, and the policy surrounding driver fines. In addition, that year, GPDA director George Russell requested more transparency from the FIA after a series of personnel changes. The FIA later publicised its penalty guidelines and driving standards' documents for the first time in June 2025, in response to the continued demands for transparency from the GPDA and fans.

=== Super License fees ===
The GPDA occasionally protests when the FIA raises the price of the FIA Super License, which all drivers must receive in order to compete in F1. In 2009, the GPDA explained that while it would not oppose reasonable price increases, "Super Licence fees should not be a revenue stream for the FIA" and "as a principle, the drivers should not be taxed to fund the costs of others fulfilling their legal duty to the drivers." The FIA eventually agreed to cut Super License fees ahead of the 2010 season.

== Membership and leadership ==
Membership of GPDA is not compulsory. During the 2017 season, nine drivers and two free practice drivers declined to join. However, by the end of the year, every F1 driver agreed to join the organisation for possibly the first time in association history.

Over the years, drivers have declined to join the organisation for a variety of reasons, such as Lewis Hamilton (lack of time and excessive entry fees), Michael Schumacher (personal distaste for the GPDA chairman), Kimi Räikkönen (lack of interest), and Max Verstappen (felt attacked by several drivers who were GPDA members and doubtful of the organisation's effectiveness), although Hamilton, Schumacher, Räikkönen, and Verstappen all eventually reconsidered.

GPDA members elect their representatives. As of 2025, there are four directors: active Formula One drivers George Russell and Carlos Sainz Jr., legal adviser Anastasia Fowle (the first non-F1 driver past or present to be appointed a GPDA director) and former Formula One driver Alexander Wurz, who serves as chairman.

=== List of chairmen ===
Chairman	Years of service
(United Kingdom) Stirling Moss	1961–1963
(Sweden) Jo Bonnier	1963–1971
(United Kingdom) Jackie Stewart	1972–1978
(South Africa) Jody Scheckter	1979–1980
(France) Didier Pironi	1980–1982
GPDA disbanded	1982–1994
(Germany) Michael Schumacher	1994–2005
(United Kingdom) David Coulthard	2005–2006
(Germany) Ralf Schumacher	2006–2008
(Spain) Pedro de la Rosa	2008–2010, 2012–2014
(Germany) Nick Heidfeld	2010
(Brazil) Rubens Barrichello	2010–2012
(Austria) Alexander Wurz	2014–present

=== List of directors ===
Note: from 1996

Director	Years	As chairman
(Germany) Michael Schumacher	1996–2005	1996–2005
(Austria) Gerhard Berger	1996	
(United Kingdom) Martin Brundle	1996	
(United Kingdom) Damon Hill	1996–1998	
(United Kingdom) David Coulthard	1996–2006	2005–2006
(Austria) Alexander Wurz	1998–2001; 2014–present	2014–present
(Italy) Jarno Trulli	2001–2006	
(Australia) Mark Webber	2003–2005; 2006–2010	
(Germany) Ralf Schumacher	2006–2007	2006–2008
(Spain) Fernando Alonso	2006–2010	
(Spain) Pedro de la Rosa	2008–2010; 2012–2014	2008–2010; 2012–2014
(Germany) Nick Heidfeld	2010	2010
(Brazil) Felipe Massa	2010–2013	
(Germany) Sebastian Vettel	2010–2024	
(Brazil) Rubens Barrichello	2010–2011	2010–2011
(United Kingdom) Jenson Button	2013–2017	
(France) Romain Grosjean	2017–2020	
(United Kingdom) George Russell	2021–present	
(United Kingdom) Anastasia Fowle	2021–present	
(Spain) Carlos Sainz Jr.	2025–present	

== See also ==
- Jackie Stewart
- Sid Watkins
- Safety in Formula One
- World Rally Drivers Alliance – Similar organisation founded by World Rally Championship drivers
