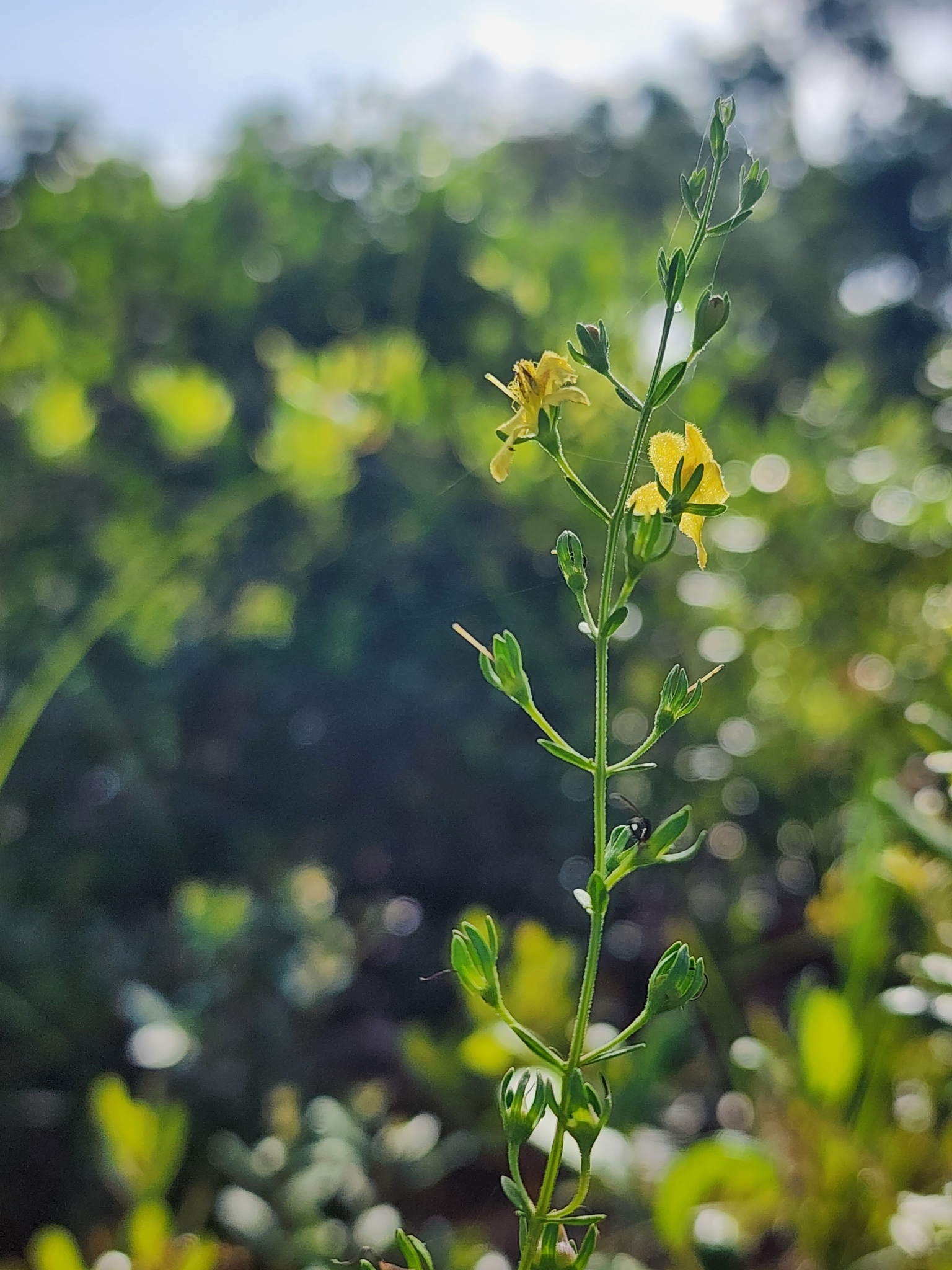

Conservation status
- Apparently Secure (NatureServe)

Scientific classification
- Kingdom: Plantae
- Clade: Tracheophytes
- Clade: Angiosperms
- Clade: Eudicots
- Clade: Asterids
- Order: Lamiales
- Family: Orobanchaceae
- Genus: Seymeria
- Species: S. pectinata

Binomial name
- Seymeria pectinata Pursh (1814)

= Seymeria pectinata =

Species of flowering plant

Seymeria pectinata, commonly called combleaf blacksenna, comb seymeria, or piedmont blacksenna, is a species of annual herb endemic to several states of the U.S. southeast coastal plain. It was also historically found in Louisiana. It, like most other members of Orobanchaceae is a hemiparasite, specifically of pines.

== Description ==
S. pectinata can grow up to 75 centimeters (approximately 2.6 feet) in height. The leaves are oppositely arranged, and are greater than 1 centimeter in length. When inflorescence occurs flowers are yellow in color.

== Habitat ==
It occurs in sandy, fire-dependent pine habitats of the southeast including flatwoods, longleaf pine sandhill, pine barrens, and scrubby flatwoods.

== Gallery ==
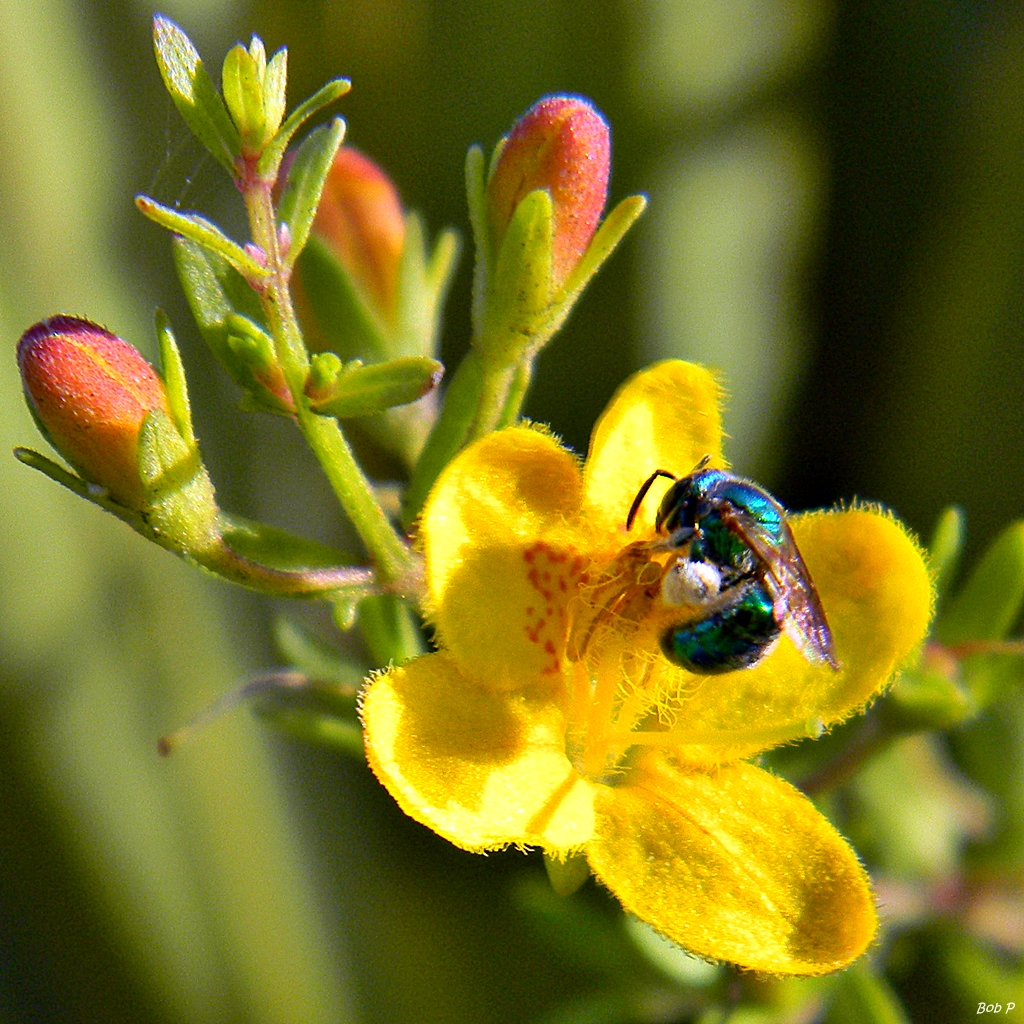

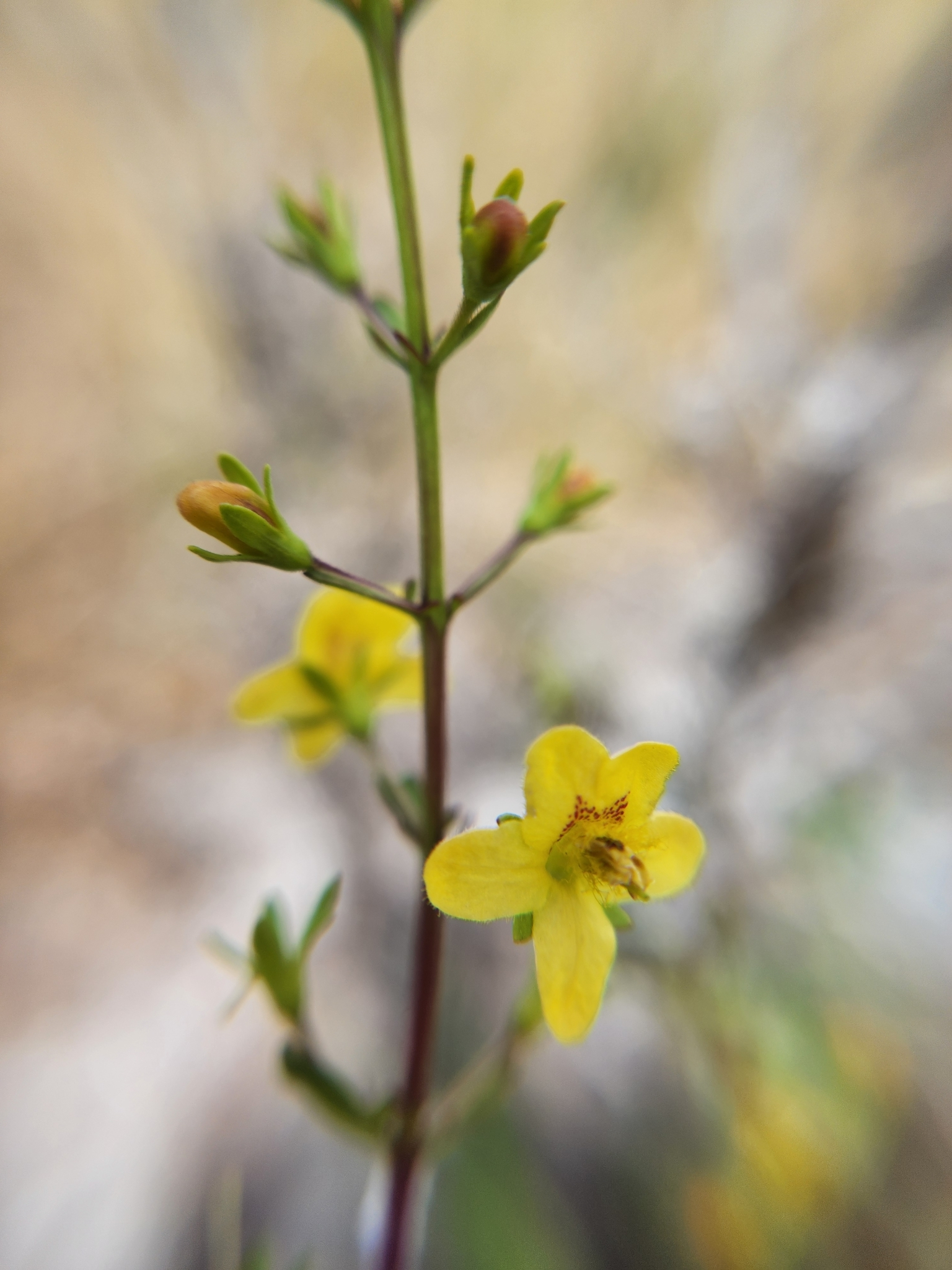

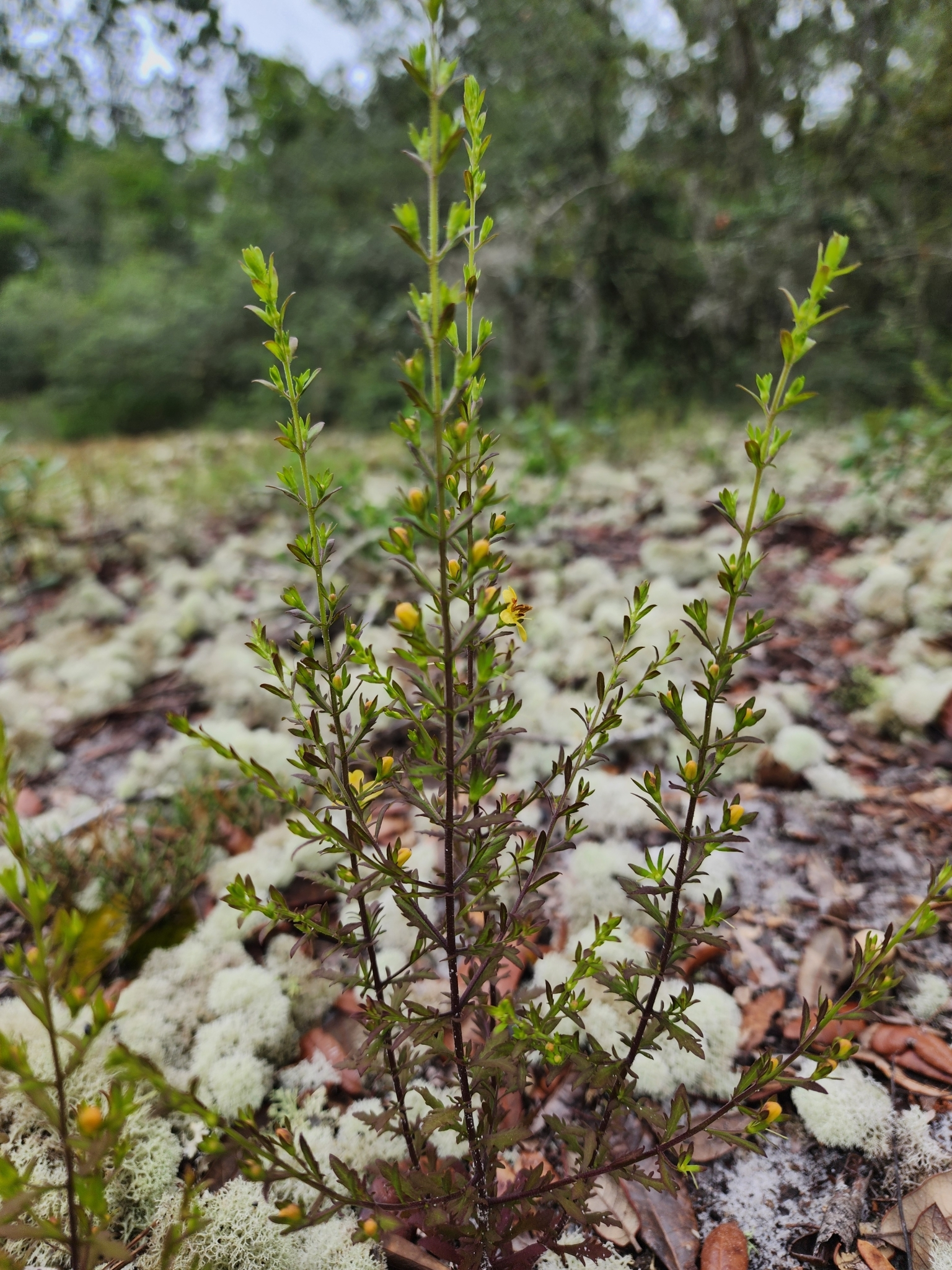
