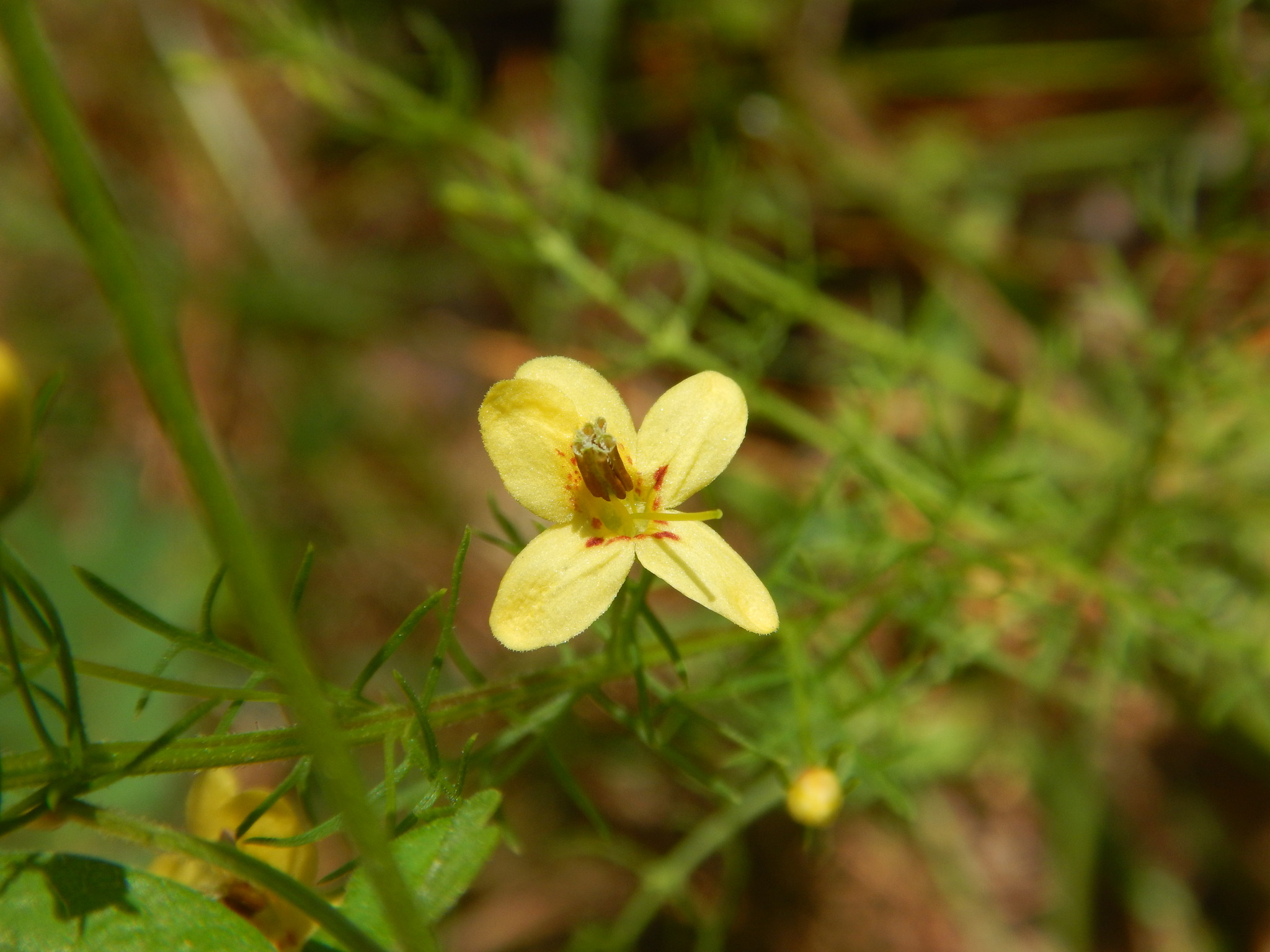

Scientific classification
- Kingdom: Plantae
- Clade: Tracheophytes
- Clade: Angiosperms
- Clade: Eudicots
- Clade: Asterids
- Order: Lamiales
- Family: Orobanchaceae
- Genus: Seymeria
- Species: S. cassioides

Binomial name
- Seymeria cassioides (J.F. Gmel.) S.F. Blake

= Seymeria cassioides =

Yaupon black-senna

Seymeria cassioides, commonly called yaupon black-senna or senna seymeria, is a species of annual forb found in North America. It is a species of obligate hermiparasite found on various species of pine.

== Description ==
Seymeria cassioides may reach a height of up to 1 meter (approximately 3.28 feet) with glandular-pubescent branches. Leaves are oppositely arranged, about 1 centimeter in length, and are either pinnately or bipinnately parted.

Inflorescence is primarily yellow in color, with a lateral red stripe on each of the five petals. Flowers are axillary and solitary. The capsule is ovoid in shape and 4 to 6 millimeters in length.

== Distribution and habitat ==
Within the United States S. cassioides can be found within the Coastal Plain region of the southeast. Its range stretches from Virginia to Florida and west to Texas. There also exist disjunct populations in the Bahamas.

This species can be found in habitats such as in pine savannas, sandhills, and cypress swamps.
