= SENA =

SENA may refer to:

- Servicio Nacional de Aprendizaje or National Training Service, public institution of education in Colombia
- SENA (cricket), acronym for South Africa, England, New Zealand and Australia

== See also ==
- Sena (disambiguation)
