= Sena Moon =

South Korean writer and translator

Sena Moon is a South Korean writer and translator. Her work has appeared in numerous publications, including Kenyon Review and Boulevard, and has won several prizes. A graduate of the University of Michigan Helen Zell Writers' Program, she is a 2024–26 Stegner Fellow at Stanford University and considered an emerging fiction writer by PEN America.

== Career ==
Moon is a graduate of the Helen Zell Writers' Program at the University of Michigan and a Stegner Fellow in fiction at Stanford University in the 2024–26 cohort. Her fiction has appeared in Kenyon Review, Guernica, and others. Her nonfiction has appeared in The Fiddlehead.

Moon has won several contests for her writing. In 2018, she won third place Glimmer Train's Short-Story Award for New Writer. In 2019, Moon's short story "Homing Spoons" won Boulevard's Short Fiction Contest. In 2020, Moon won the PEN/Robert J. Dau Short Story Prize for Emerging Writers for her short story, "Dog Dreams", which appeared first in Quarterly West. It was subsequently published by Catapult in the anthology, Best Debut Short Stories 2020: The PEN America Dau Prize; in the anthology's introduction, editor Yuka Igarashi called it "beguiling". As a recipient of the prize, Sena Moon has continued to receive support from PEN America as an emerging fiction writer. In 2021, an excerpt of Moon's novel-in-progress, Familiar Strangers, won second place in the CRAFT Magazine First Chapters Contest. In 2023, her short story "Slow and Then Fast" won the Carve Magazine Prose & Poetry Contest.
