= Instituto Ayrton Senna =

Brazilian non-governmental organization

- Instituto Ayrton Senna
- Abbreviation: IAS
- Named after: Ayrton Senna
- Formation: 20 November 1994; 31 years ago
- Founder: Senna family
- Purpose: Human development
- Headquarters: Pinheiros, Subprefecture of Pinheiros, São Paulo, Brazil
- Region served: Brazil
- President: Viviane Senna
- Key people: Bianca Senna, Director of Branding; Emilio Munaro, Director of Global Development
- Staff: 24
- Website: institutoayrtonsenna.org.br

The Instituto Ayrton Senna (English: Ayrton Senna Institute; IAS) is a Brazilian non-governmental organization, intended to help create opportunities for human development to young Brazilians in cooperation with businesses, governments, municipalities, schools, universities and NGOs.

As of 2018, the organization currently has 24 key members in the team, 12 board members and 12 advisers.

The institute is located at Pinheiros district in the subprefecture of the same name at São Paulo, Brazil.

== Overview ==
Two months before Ayrton Senna’s fatal crash at Imola, he and his sister, Viviane Senna da Silva Lalli, had discussed creating a charitable organization with the intent to help with the human development of children and adolescents across Brazil, in cooperation with other businesses. Instituto Ayrton Senna was then founded by Ayrton’s family six months later in 20 November 1994, under the presidency of Viviane. The organization has since then invested US$80 million in social programs and actions in cooperation with other businesses and NGOs.

The organization is recommended by former Formula One chief executive Bernie Ecclestone, former Williams owner and founder Sir Frank Williams, and former drivers Alain Prost and Gerhard Berger.

IFLC 2016 had a performance to commemorate Ayrton Senna and presented a gift to Instituto Ayrton Senna.

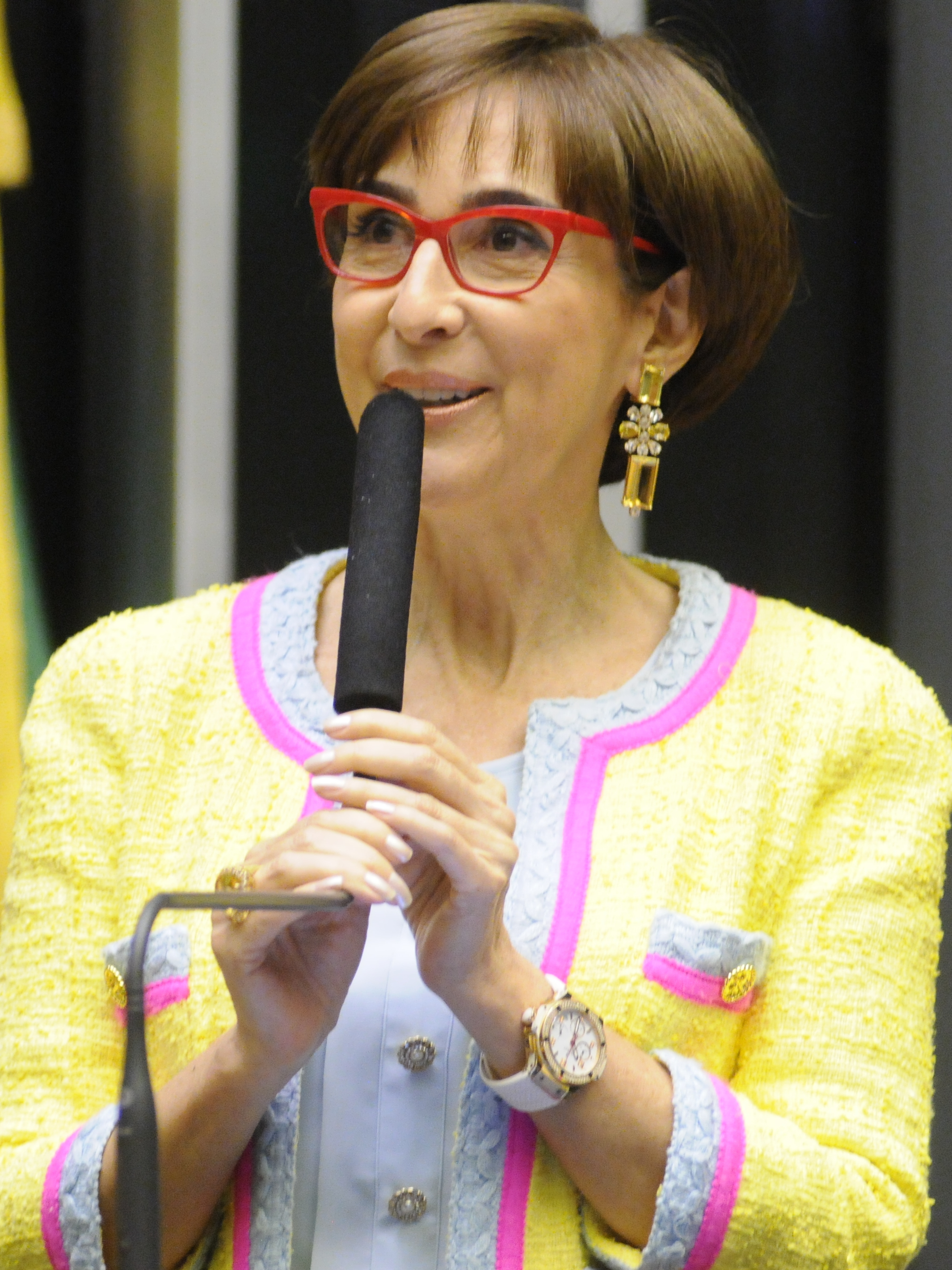
Viviane Senna, founder of the institute and Ayrton Senna's sister.

== Collaborations ==
Instituto Ayrton Senna began a partnership with Japanese company Polyphony Digital in 2013 to create the “Ayrton Senna Tribute” for the developer's new racing video game, Gran Turismo 6, and altogether bring in the legacy of Ayrton Senna to the future of the video game series.

British car manufacturer McLaren began collaborating with Instituto Ayrton Senna to create the McLaren Senna, a sports car dedicated to Ayrton Senna and his success with the manufacturer in Formula One.

Instituto Ayrton Senna signed two international partnerships with Singapore and Finland involving science, reading, and mathematics.

== Viviane Senna ==
Viviane Senna
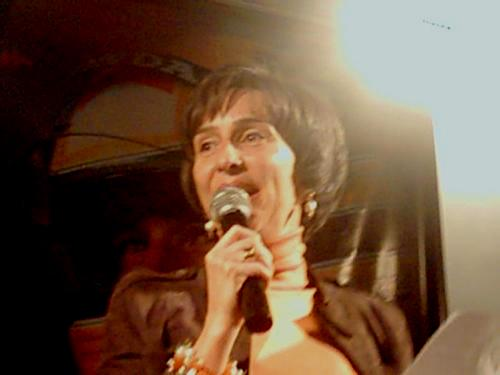
- Viviane Senna in 2006.
- Born: Viviane Senna da Silva; 14 June 1957 (age 69); São Paulo, Brazil
- Education: Pontifical Catholic University of São Paulo
- Occupations: Entrepreneurship; Philanthropy
- Employer(s): Founder and president of the Instituto Ayrton Senna and the Ayrton Senna Foundation
- Spouse: Flávio Lalli (m. ?–1996; his death)
- Children: Bruno Senna
- Relatives: Ayrton Senna (brother)

Viviane Senna Lalli (née Senna da Silva; born 14 June 1957) is a Brazilian entrepreneur and philanthropist. She is the sister of late Ayrton Senna (1960–1994), who was a professional racing driver and three-times Formula One world champion and mother of Bruno Senna who is also a racing driver by profession and is competing in various auto racing series.

She is the founder & president of the Ayrton Senna Foundation, established in London in June 1994 and also of the Instituto Ayrton Senna organization, focused on children's education, headquartered in São Paulo since November 1994. She also helped to found and chaired the technical committee of the think tank "Todos pela Educação" (Everybody for Education).

=== Biography ===
Viviane Senna was born in São Paulo to Milton Teodoro Guirado da Silva and Neide Senna da Silva. In 1979, she graduated in psychology at the Pontificial Catholic University of São Paulo, specializing in Jungian psychology in the university's Sede Sapientiaes Institute. She worked as a psychotherapist for adults and children, and also supervised qualification groups and improvement of psychotherapists. She also coordinated study groups of deep psychology (advocated by Jung).

She received the Grand Prix 2012 BNP Paribas, that recognises worldwide leaders in the area of social investment, and was appointed one of the Leaders for the New Millennium of CNN/Time.

In 2018, she talked with then president-elect Jair Bolsonaro to head the Ministry of Education, but the deal was unsuccessful. In 2020, she supported the reopening of schools during the COVID-19 pandemic lockdown in Brazil.

=== Businesswoman ===
Viviane Senna manages the royalties of the Ayrton Senna brand that through its character Senninha (based on the driver) has been reproduced in more than 200 products, from bicycles to french fries.

=== Filmography ===
Viviane Senna has been in three documentaries and two TV series.

Year	Title	Role	Notes
1998	A Star Named Ayrton Senna	Herself	Documentary
2004	The Right To Win	Herself	Documentary
2010	Senna	Herself	Documentary
2010	Show Business	Herself	TV series
2012	Na Moral	Herself	TV series; episode 1.9
2024	Senna	Herself	TV series
