= Sienna Street, Kraków =

Street in Kraków, Poland

Sienna Street
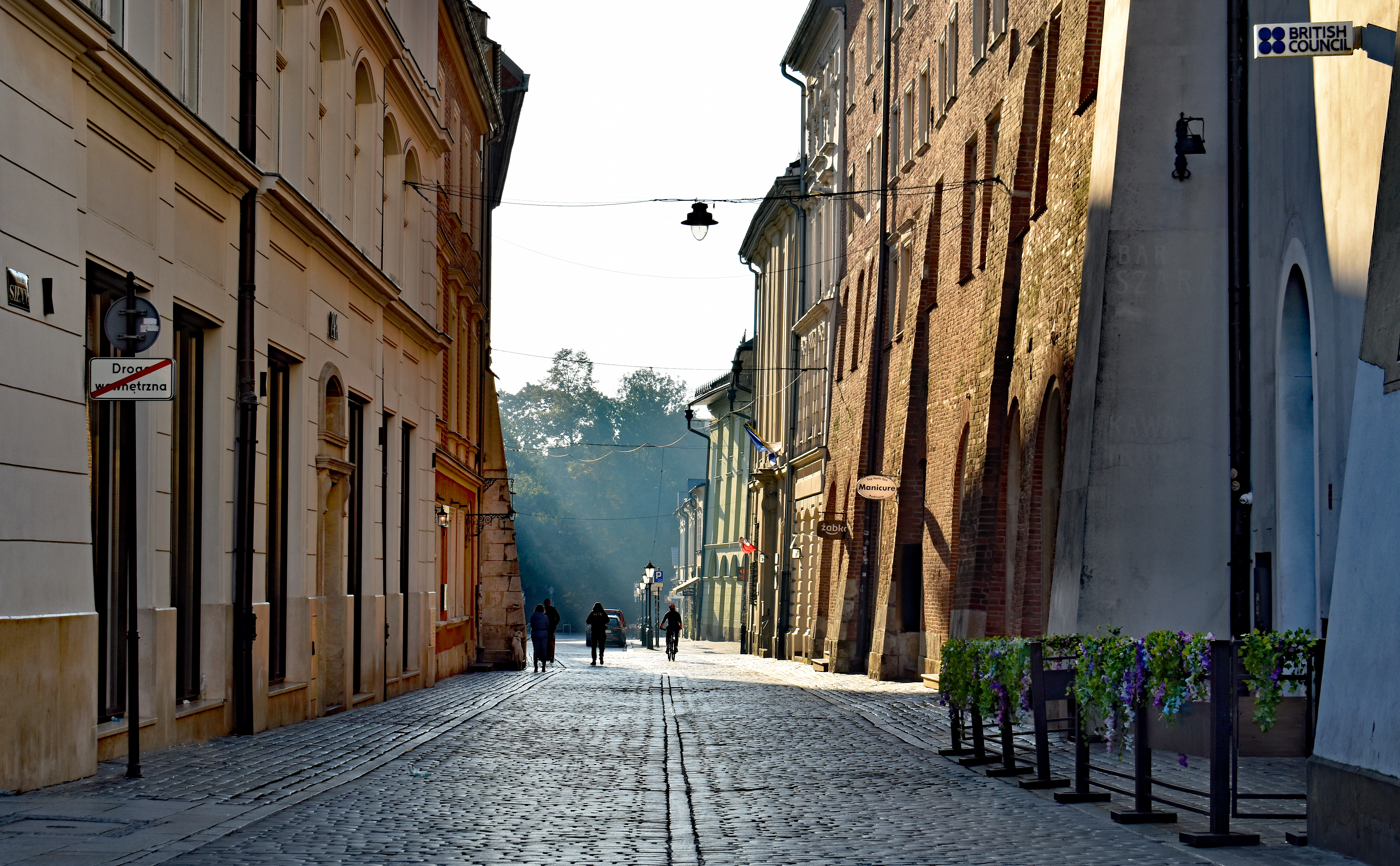
- View from the Main Square towards the east.

- Part of: Kraków Old Town district
- Length: 340 m (1,120 ft)
- West end: Main Square
- East end: Westerplatte Street, Starowiślna Street, Wielopole Street, Saint Gertrude Street

Sienna Street (Polish: Ulica Sienna, lit. Hay Street) is a historic street in Kraków, Poland, in district Old Town. The street extends from the Main Square towards Westerplatte Street.

The street was part of a former trading route between Wieliczka, Tarnów and Lwów. After the junction near the Planty Park, the street extends as Starowiślna Street. Its former name was Zwierzęca Street (Ulica Zwierzęca, lit. Animal Street) due to nearby slaughter houses. The street would also be known as Szkolna Street (Ulica Szkolna, lit. School Street) due to the former existence of a nearby school devoted to the Virgin Mary.

== Features ==
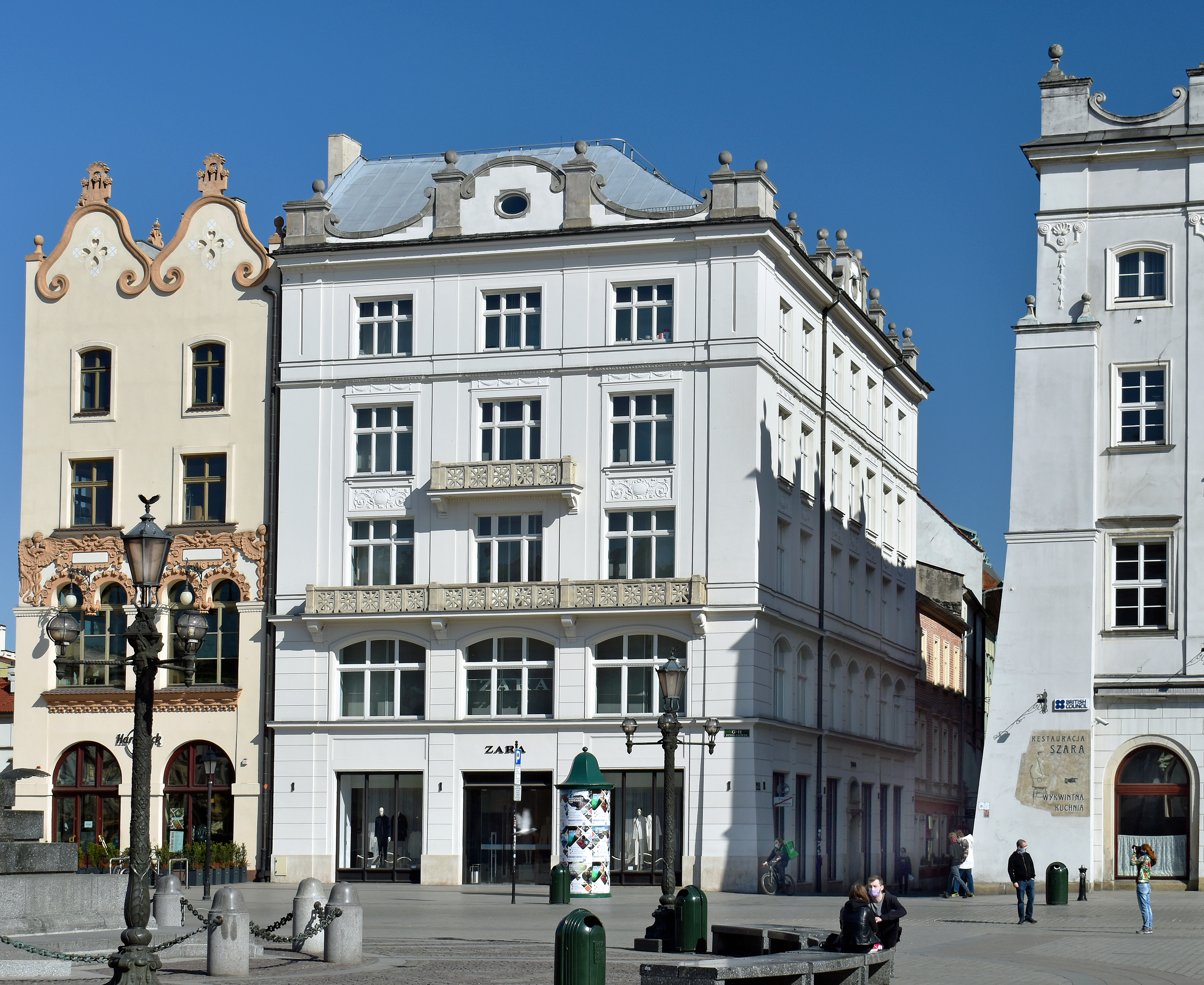
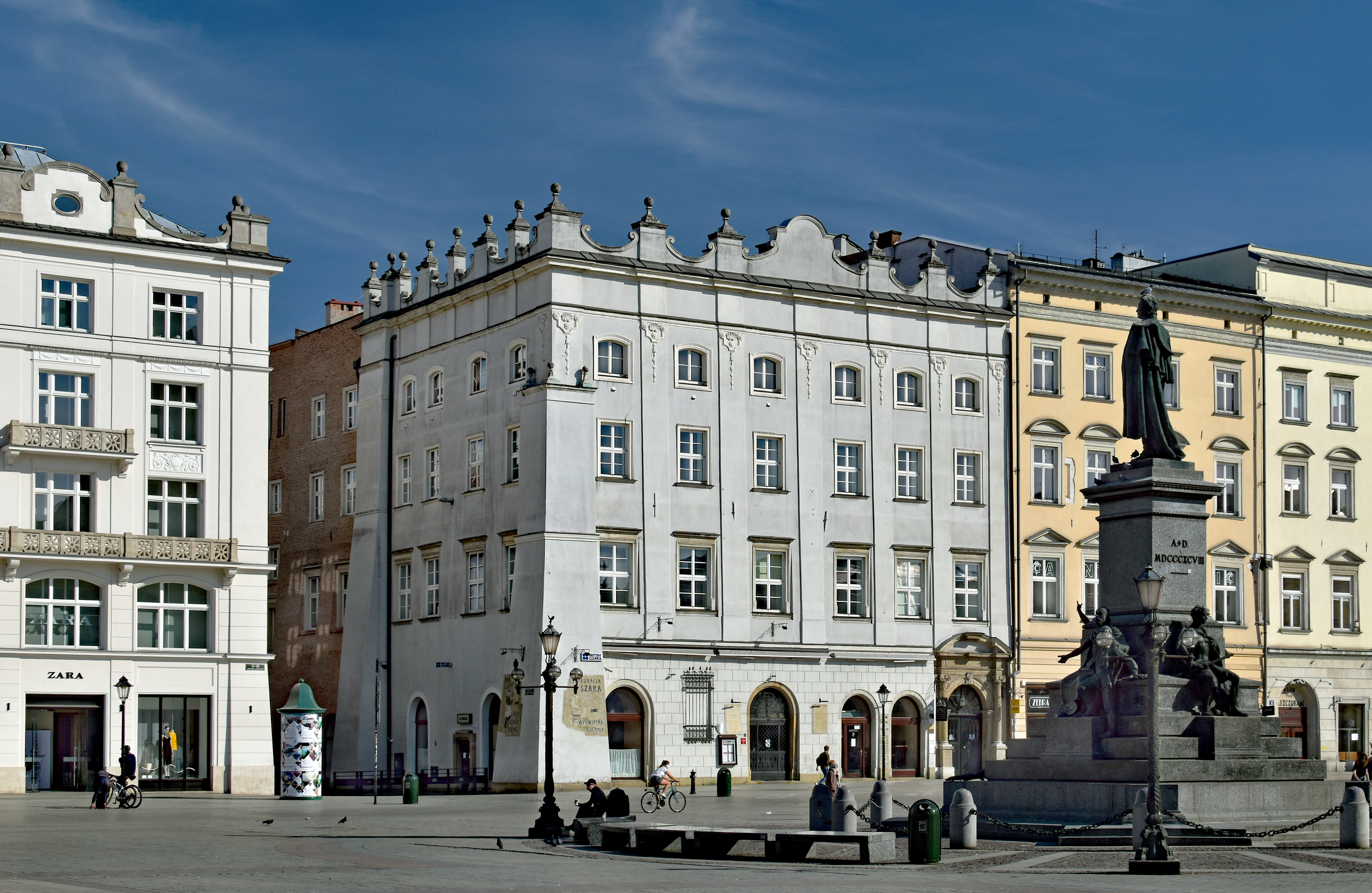
Street No.	Short description	Picture
5	Bidermanowski House is a Mannerist house built between 1912 and 1914. Presently, the retail ground floor houses a boutique of the Spanish retailer Zara.
6	Grey House is built in the eighteenth century. Presently, the building houses offices and office space (e.g. British Council) on the ground floor, with private apartments located on upper floors. It is one of the largest townhouses in the Old Town.

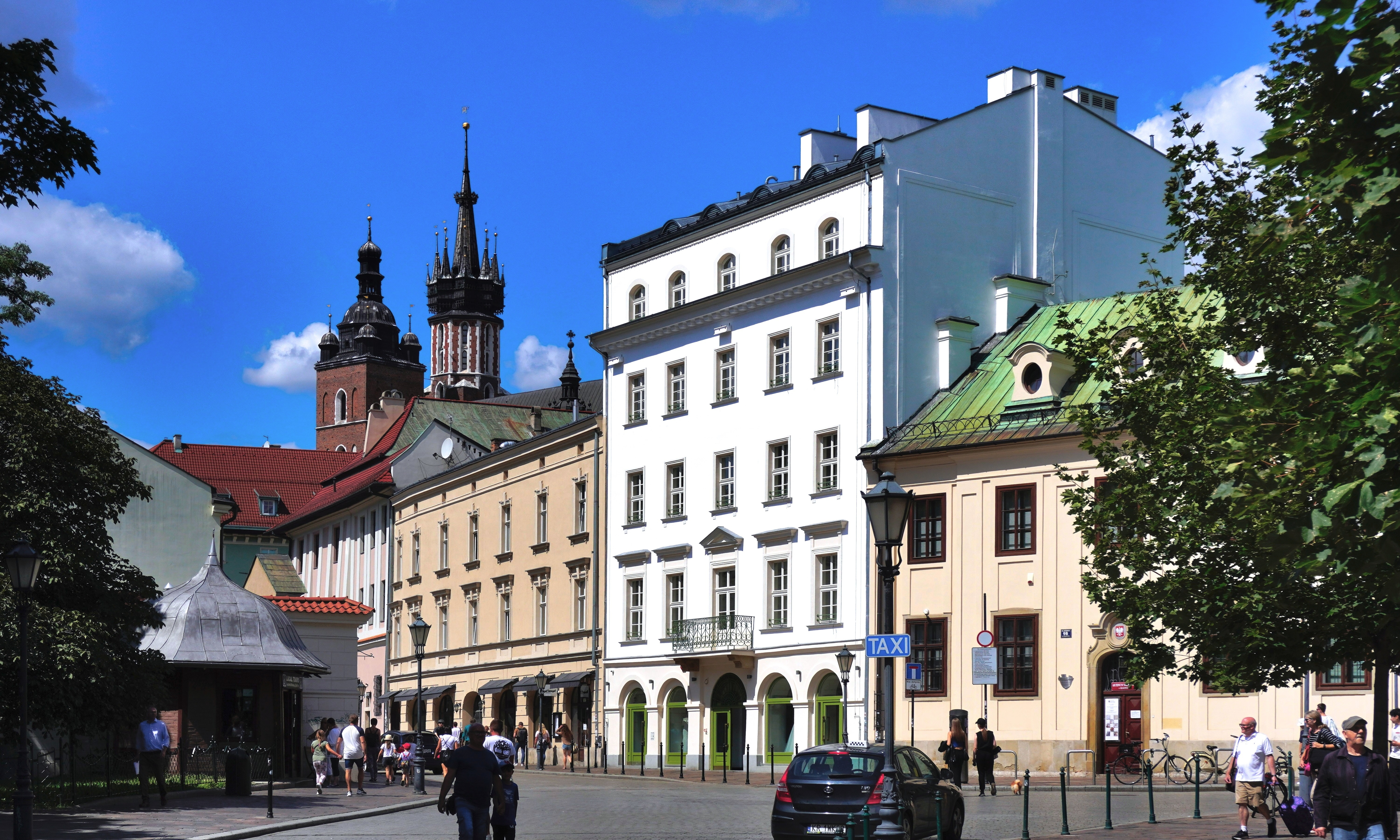
Street buildings, view from Planty Park

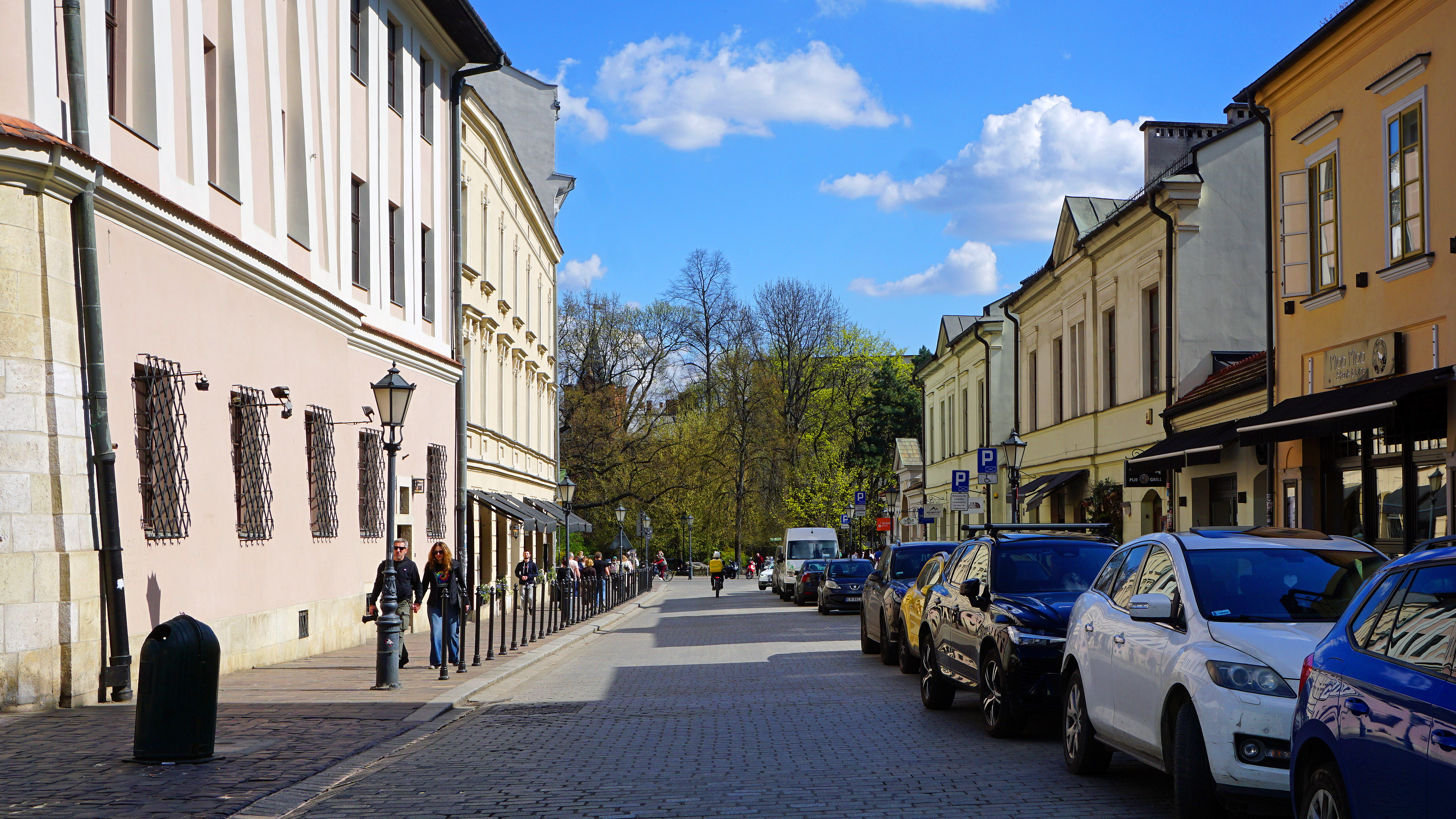
View to the east at the intersection with Stolarska Street
