= Siena University =

Siena University could mean:

- University of Siena, one of the oldest and first publicly funded universities in Italy, founded in 1240
- Università per Stranieri di Siena, an Italian university oriented towards study by foreign students
- Siena Heights University in Adrian, Michigan
- Siena University (New York)
