= Balthasar Seña =

Balthasar Seña (c. 1590 – 19 July 1614) was a Spanish Jesuit missionary and linguist in South America.

== Life ==
Seña was born in c. 1590 in Barcelona, Spain. He entered the Jesuit novitiate at Tarragona, Aragon, in 1608. Before completing his studies he volunteered for the Guarani missions of Paraguay, and sailed from Lisbon in company with the veteran missionary, Juan Romero, in 1610, continuing his studies on the voyage.

The rest of his life was spent at the Guarani mission town of Guarambare or with the Itatines, whose language he studied and reduced to dictionary form. He defended them against slave-dealers, and declined an offered preferment at Santa Fe in order to remain with his mission work.

Attending the sick throughout a contagious epidemic, he himself fell ill and died on 19 July 1614 in Guarambare. His remains were afterwards taken up and reinterred at the Jesuit college at Asunción.
