= Death of Ayrton Senna =

1994 death of Brazilian race car driver

- Senna's damaged Williams FW16 just after his crash at the Tamburello corner of the Imola circuit
- Date: 1 May 1994; 32 years ago
- Time: 2:17 p.m. (CEST)
- Venue: Autodromo Enzo e Dino Ferrari
- Location: Imola, Emilia-Romagna, Italy
- Cause: High speed crash into a wall
- Deaths: Ayrton Senna

On 1 May 1994, Brazilian Formula One driver Ayrton Senna was killed after his car crashed into a concrete barrier while he was leading the 1994 San Marino Grand Prix at the Imola Circuit in Italy.

Senna's death was the capstone to one of the darkest weekends in Formula One history. The previous day, Austrian driver Roland Ratzenberger died when his car crashed during qualifying rounds. Several other collisions took place that weekend, including a serious one involving Rubens Barrichello. Ratzenberger and Senna's crashes were the first fatal accidents to occur during a Formula One race since Riccardo Paletti died at the 1982 Canadian Grand Prix.

Senna's death, as well as other events of the race weekend, changed how safety aspects were considered at the time and triggered reforms prioritizing driver safety in Formula One. The Formula One drivers' union, the Grand Prix Drivers' Association, was re-established in the wake of Senna's death. Formula One did not suffer a fatal accident for another twenty years, until Jules Bianchi sustained fatal injuries at the 2014 Japanese Grand Prix.

The Supreme Court of Cassation of Italy ruled that mechanical failure was the cause of the crash, as post-crash analysis found that Senna's steering column had failed while rounding the Tamburello corner.

== Background ==
Ayrton Senna joined McLaren-Honda in 1988 and won three World Drivers' Championships with the team from 1988 to 1993. However, he had spent the last two years of his career in uncompetitive machinery, as the combination of Williams-Renault began dominating the sport.

Although Senna's fellow drivers considered him the best driver in the sport, Williams outpowered him with the help of its technological advantages. Renault boasted the best engine on the grid. Williams also employed a talented group of chassis designers, including veteran engineer Patrick Head and ascending aerodynamicist Adrian Newey. However, the most controversial aspect of Williams' package was its set of innovative electronic driver aids, including active suspension, traction control, and anti-lock brakes. In 1992 and 1993, Williams' Nigel Mansell and Alain Prost stormed to the Drivers' Championship, each winning eight of the first ten races.

Although most teams in Formula One scrambled to copy Williams' electronic advantage following its 1992 successes, including Senna's McLaren, Williams maintained its advantage in 1993. To equalise competition, the sport's top regulator, Max Mosley, attempted to ban active suspension midway through the 1993 season. However, he was unable to force through such an abrupt change. Williams was the only team that specifically optimised its chassis for active suspension, and it was pointed out that without active suspension, Williams would have to sit out at least three races while Head and Newey redesigned the car. Mosley had to settle for banning the electronics at the end of the season.

Senna joined Williams in 1994, driver aids or no driver aids. Although the Williams FW16 was still very fast (Williams won the Constructors' Championship in 1994), Senna was disappointed with its poor handling. He frequently called his old rival Prost, now in retirement, to complain about the car. The car was touchy because its design philosophy was still oriented towards active suspension. In addition, its set-up window was very narrow, leaving minimal room for error. Newey later said that the car was "aerodynamically unstable," explaining that "having had active suspension for two years, when we then lost it we had more trouble re-adapting to passive suspension than other people who hadn't been on it for very long." In addition, Senna was unhappy that the cockpit was not a good fit for his body.

Williams did not have enough testing time to perfect the car before the start of the season. In fact, the car was not even ready in time for the traditional pre-season test at the Estoril Circuit, where Senna actually drove a modified version of the previous year's Williams FW15C (the FW15D). Senna expressed deep misgivings about the FW15D following the test:

I have a very negative feeling about driving the car and driving it on the limit and so on. Therefore, I didn't have a single run or a single lap that I felt comfortable or reasonably confident. I am uncomfortable in the car. It all feels wrong. We changed the seat and the wheel, but even so I was already asking for more room. Going back to when we raced at Estoril last September, it feels much more difficult. Some of that is down to the lack of electronic change. Also, the car has its own characteristics which I'm not fully confident in yet. It makes you a lot more tense and that stresses you.

Williams rolled out the FW16 at the Jerez test on 25 February 1994, but it was not an improvement.

Senna got off to one of the worst starts of his career, retiring from the first two races. In the season opener at Interlagos, Senna took pole and initially got out to a large lead, but fell behind Benetton's Michael Schumacher after a poor pit stop. Senna pushed the car hard to catch up, but on lap 55 he lost control and spun off at the Subida dos Boxes corner. At the Pacific Grand Prix, Senna took pole again, but the car continued to perform poorly in slow-speed corners. Senna spun off track after being hit from behind by Mika Hakkinen's McLaren. Senna's teammate Damon Hill also spun off several laps later, but was fortunate to recover and made his way back to second place before retiring with a transmission failure.

Entering round 3 at Imola, Senna trailed Schumacher by 20 points. Williams readied upgrades to hopefully correct the car's handling issues.

== Grand Prix weekend ==
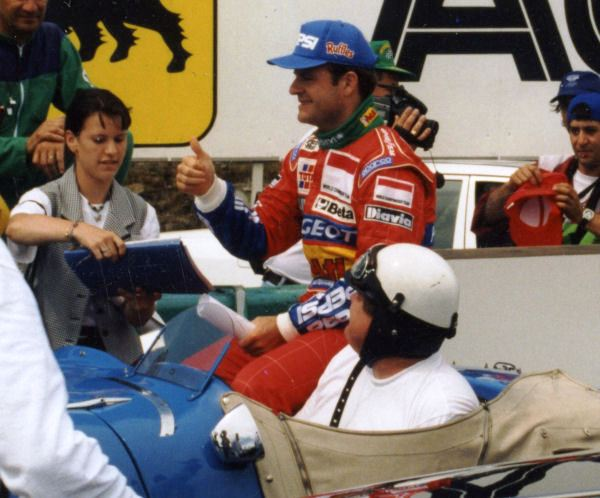
Rubens Barrichello (pictured at the 1995 French Grand Prix) suffered a high-speed crash at the Variante Bassa chicane.

The weekend of the San Marino Grand Prix was marred by a variety of dangerous racing incidents and two deaths, including Senna's. It is widely considered one of the darkest weekends in Formula One history.

=== Friday practice and qualifying ===
On the Friday before the race, Senna's protégé, Jordan's Rubens Barrichello, clipped a curb and crashed heavily at 225 km/h (140 mph) at the Variante Bassa chicane, breaking his nose and arm. Senna got out of his Williams car and went to the scene of the collision. Barrichello's tongue blocked his airway and emergency work performed by FIA doctor Sid Watkins saved his life. Barrichello reported that Senna was the first person he saw upon regaining consciousness. After learning Barrichello had survived, Senna returned to his car. He set the fastest time in qualifying, picking up provisional pole with a time half a second faster than Schumacher's.

After the session concluded, Senna left his car and went to the Williams motor home to review the car with race engineer David Brown. He was so absorbed in checking for problems that he kept his pre-arranged press interviewers waiting for an hour. Following the interviews, Senna continued his work with Brown for another two hours.

Once he arrived back at his hotel in Castel San Pietro, Senna reportedly telephoned his girlfriend Adriane Galisteu and broke down in tears while recounting Barrichello's crash earlier that day.

=== Saturday qualifying ===
On Saturday morning, Senna tried out the car again and agreed with teammate Damon Hill that the car had improved. Barrichello was released from the hospital and told Senna that he would fly back to England and watch the race on television.

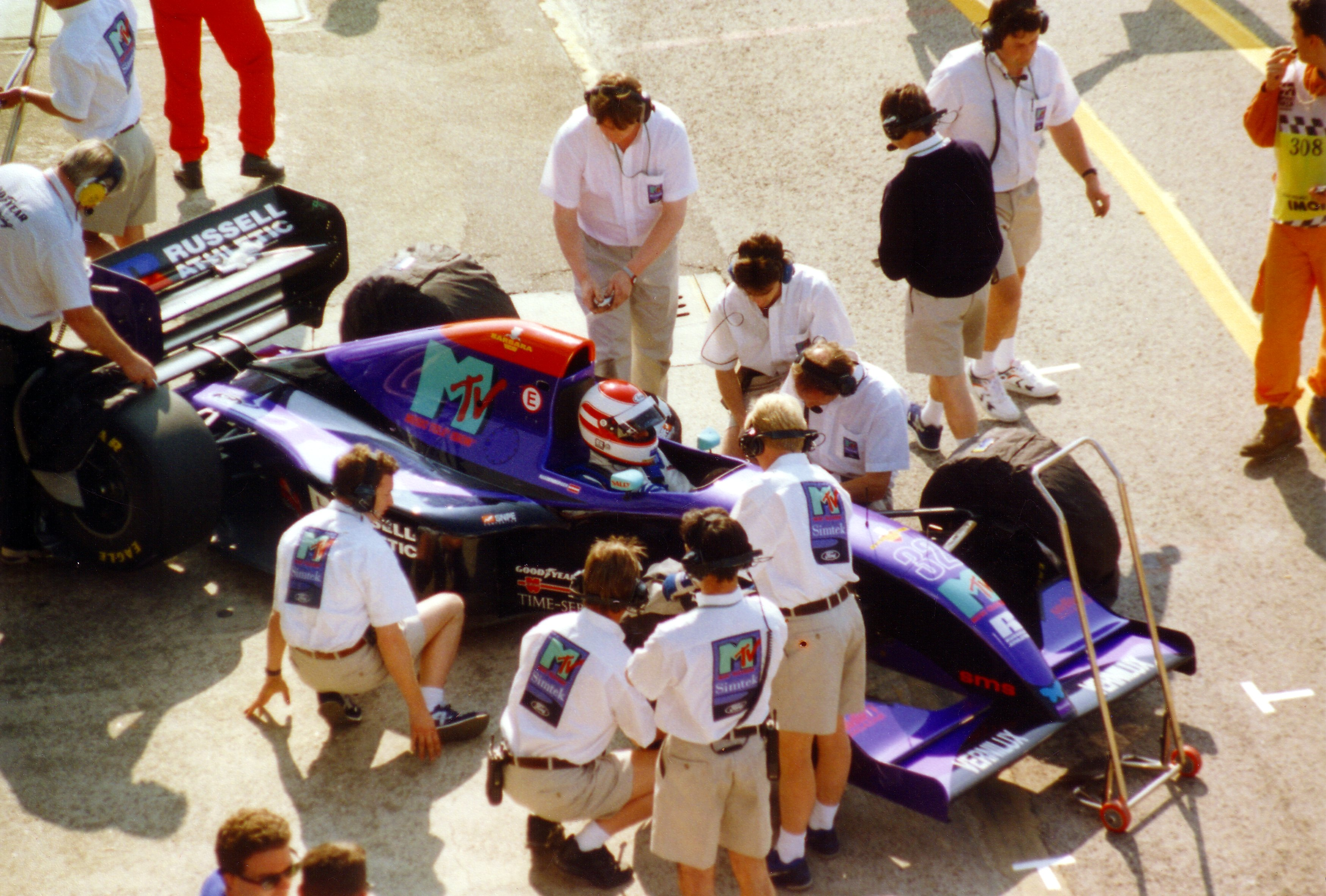
Roland Ratzenberger was killed after colliding with a concrete wall at the Villeneuve Curve. The picture is from earlier the same day.

In the afternoon, the second qualifying session began. 18 minutes into the session, Simtek's Roland Ratzenberger struck the concrete wall on the outside of the Villeneuve curve at 314 km/h (195 mph). He had previously damaged his front wing when he went off track, and at the Villeneuve corner, part of the wing broke off completely, sending the car off course. He suffered a basilar skull fracture and a ruptured aorta, and was pronounced dead on arrival at the hospital.

Qualifying was red-flagged following Ratzenberger's accident. Williams and Benetton agreed to sit out when qualifying resumed out of respect for Ratzenberger. In any event Senna's Friday time was fast enough to secure the pole position.

Senna saw the replays of the collision and rushed into the pitlane to get inside a course car. When he arrived, with Ratzenberger taken into an ambulance, Senna inspected the damaged Simtek. He then attended the circuit's medical centre where he learnt from neurosurgeon Sid Watkins that Ratzenberger had died from injuries sustained in the accident. When the two left the centre together, Watkins told Senna that he did not have to race ever again and suggested that he withdraw from the race and go fishing with him. Senna responded by telling Watkins he could not stop racing and then went back to the Williams garage, where he summoned Patrick Head and Frank Williams, telling them of the situation and deciding to withdraw for the remainder of the qualifying session.

Reportedly, Senna retired to his motor home where he broke down in tears and collapsed onto the floor. This had concerned Williams, who asked Betise Assumpção, Senna's PR chief, to arrange a meeting to discuss Senna's emotional state. Senna decided not to attend the post-qualifying press conference, leading the FIA to discuss but decide not to take disciplinary action against him. On the following day, however, race stewards called Senna out of his motor home to discuss his having commandeered a course car to visit Ratzenberger's crash site. A row ensued and Senna stormed off in disgust. The stewards decided to take no action.

=== Sunday warm-ups and drivers' briefing ===
On Sunday morning, Senna was the fastest in the warm-up session by nine-tenths of a second.

Senna was scheduled to film an in-car lap of the Imola Circuit for French television channel TF1, where his now-retired rival Alain Prost was working as a pundit. They ate breakfast together, and Senna encouraged Prost to help out with a proposed revival of the Grand Prix Drivers' Association (GPDA), the old Formula One drivers' trade union. They agreed to meet before the Monaco Grand Prix with further details, but this was not to be. After the breakfast, Senna filmed the lap for television and personally greeted "our dear friend Alain" on camera, to Prost's surprise.

At the drivers' briefing, Senna attended along with Gerhard Berger. Since he was unwilling to speak out owing to the earlier row with race officials that had left him still fraught with emotions, Senna asked Berger to raise his concerns about the pace car's presence during the formation lap, which had no role other than to promote the then latest Porsche 911. At the San Marino Grand Prix, this pace car was thus made to leave the grid in advance of the Formula One cars, instead of together.

Senna then met with fellow drivers to discuss the re-establishment of the GPDA in an attempt to increase safety in Formula One. As the most senior driver, Senna offered to take the role of leader, starting with the next race event in Monaco. Niki Lauda suggested that Senna lead the group because of his strong personality and standing in the sport, relative to the other drivers.

In preparation for the race, Senna placed a furled Austrian flag in the cockpit of his car. It was later inferred that Senna intended to raise the flag in memory of Ratzenberger (who was Austrian), if Senna won the race.

=== Sunday start ===
At the start of the race, Pedro Lamy and JJ Lehto were involved in a serious collision. A wheel and debris landed in the main grandstand, injuring eight fans and a police officer. Track officials deployed the safety car, an Opel Vectra driven by Formula Three driver Max Angelelli, to slow down the field and allow the removal of debris. The competitors proceeded behind the safety car for five laps.

The Vectra was based on a family sedan, so it was not particularly fast; Senna pulled alongside the Vectra to gesture to its driver to speed up because his tyres were getting cold and were losing grip. A subsequent investigation showed that the Vectra was inadequate for the role of safety car, because its brakes overheated and it, therefore, had to be driven slowly, lest it cause another crash itself. One of the theories explaining the accident suggests that this slow running caused the cars to suffer a drop in tyre temperature and pressure. Before the start of the sixth lap, David Brown told Senna via pit-to-car radio that the safety car was pulling off, and Senna acknowledged the message.

== Senna's crash ==
A map of the circuit per 1994 layout, with the Tamburello corner encircled

On lap 6, the race resumed and Senna immediately set a quick pace with the third-quickest lap of the race, followed by Schumacher. At the flat-out left-hander Tamburello corner, Schumacher noticed that Senna took a tight line through the curve and his car jiggled on the bumps.

On lap 7, the second lap at racing speed, Senna's car left the racing line at Tamburello, ran in a straight line off the track and struck an unprotected concrete barrier. Telemetry data recovered from the wreckage shows he entered the corner at 309 km/h (192 mph) and then braked hard, downshifting twice to slow down before impacting the wall at 211 km/h (131 mph). The car hit the wall at a shallow angle, tearing off the right front wheel and nose cone before spinning to a halt.

=== Cause of death after impact ===
After Senna's car stopped, he was initially motionless in the cockpit. After about ten seconds, as recorded by the close-up aerial footage, his head was seen to lift to the left before returning to its original position. Thereafter he did not move again. The right front wheel had shot up upon impact and entered the cockpit, striking the right frontal area of his helmet. The violence of the wheel's impact shoved his head back against the headrest (which was already far forward from the car's impact with the wall) causing fatal skull fractures. In addition, a piece of suspension attached to the wheel had also partially penetrated his Bell M3 helmet and caused trauma to his head. Also, it appeared that a jagged piece of the upright assembly had penetrated the helmet visor just above his right eye. Senna was using a medium-sized (58 cm) M3 helmet with a new "thin" Bell visor. Any one of the three injuries would probably have killed him. Only Senna’s extremely high level of fitness meant he was still breathing by the time he was taken out of his crashed car; he had suffered brain death on impact but the lack of any physical injury to the rest of his body meant that his heart and lungs continued to function.

After the crash, it was immediately evident that Senna had suffered some form of injury, because his helmet was seen to be motionless and leaning slightly to the right. The subtle movement of his head in the seconds that followed raised false hopes. Moments after the crash, Angelo Orsi, a photographer and a friend of Senna, took photographs of Senna in the car after his helmet was removed and Senna being treated before marshals blocked his view. Despite numerous offers, the photographs have been seen by only Orsi and the Senna family, who insisted that Orsi not publish them.

=== Extrication and trip to hospital ===
Fire marshals arrived at the car and were unable to touch Senna before qualified medical personnel arrived. The first responders included Professor Sid Watkins, and doctors Giuseppe Pezzi and Domenico Salcito, who removed Senna's helmet. Television coverage from an overhead helicopter was seen around the world as rescue workers gave Senna medical attention. Close inspection of the area in which the medical staff treated Senna revealed a considerable amount of blood on the ground, probably from the pieces of suspension and upright assembly penetrating his helmet, which had ruptured his superficial temporal artery. From visible injuries to Senna's head, it was evident to attending medical professionals that he had sustained a grave head trauma. An emergency tracheotomy was conducted alongside the track to establish a secure airway through which the medical personnel could artificially maintain his breathing. The race was stopped one minute and nine seconds after Senna's crash. Williams team manager Ian Harrison went up to race control, finding a scene where many race officials were sensing that Senna's crash had been serious. Bernie Ecclestone later arrived in race control to calm the situation.

Neurosurgeon Sid Watkins, the head of Formula One's on-track medical team, performed the on-site tracheotomy on Senna. Watkins later reported:

He looked serene. I raised his eyelids and it was clear from his pupils that he had a massive brain injury. We lifted him from the cockpit and laid him on the ground. As we did, he sighed and, although I am not religious, I felt his spirit depart at that moment.

Watkins cleared the respiratory passages, stemmed the blood flow, replaced lost blood and immobilised the cervical area. He radioed for a medical helicopter and asked the intensive care anaesthetist, Giovanni Gordini, to escort Senna to Maggiore Hospital, along with emergency physician Alessandro Misley. Gordini later reported:

I arrived a few minutes after Watkins and noticed that Ayrton had lost blood from the wound above his right eyebrow from the blow from the suspension, but the most serious damage was at the base of the skull, where the arteries were already damaged after the impact. External and internal bleeding ensued at that point, in addition to injuries to the brain.

During the safety car period, Érik Comas brought his Larrousse-Ford to the pit lane to correct a vibration issue caused by contact under a yellow flag on the first lap. Shortly after the helicopter landed on the racing surface, Comas left the pit area and attempted to rejoin the now red-flagged Grand Prix owing to a miscommunication with his crew. The race marshals waved frantically at Comas as he approached Tamburello, since he was apparently unaware of what was taking place, and he slammed on his brakes in time to stop the Larrousse and avoid a collision with the medical helicopter. When he spotted Comas approaching the accident scene, John Watson – covering the events as an analyst for EuroSport – said it was the "most ridiculous thing I've ever seen at any time in my life".

Senna's car was eventually lifted onto a truck and returned to the pit lane where officials impounded it. However, an unidentified person insisted that the black-box data carried on the car be removed. At 15:00, around 43 minutes after the crash, the helicopter landed in front of the Maggiore Hospital. Doctors rushed Senna into intensive care; a brain scan confirmed the diagnosis made on the track. At 15:10, Senna's heart stopped beating, doctors restarted his heart, and he was placed on a life-support machine. Senna's brother Leonardo arranged for a priest to perform the last rites which occurred at 18:15. Senna's heart stopped beating again at 18:37, and it was decided not to restart it. Doctor Maria Teresa Fiandri, the emergency department head physician at the hospital who was off-duty and had been watching the race live from home with her sons, immediately left for the hospital and arrived at the same time as Senna's helicopter landed. In her interview after 20 years, she confirmed that the blood loss suffered by Senna was due to a damaged superficial temporal artery and that, apart from his head injuries, Senna appeared serene and the rest of the body was intact. Fiandri became responsible for providing medical updates to the media and public that had amassed at the hospital and, at 18:40, she announced that Senna had died.

Some time after the race, Williams team manager Ian Harrison was called by an Italian lawyer informing Harrison of Senna's death and that it was being treated as a "road traffic accident". Early in the morning of 2 May, Harrison was called by another lawyer, who took him to a mortuary. Harrison declined to see Senna's body upon being asked.

== State funeral ==
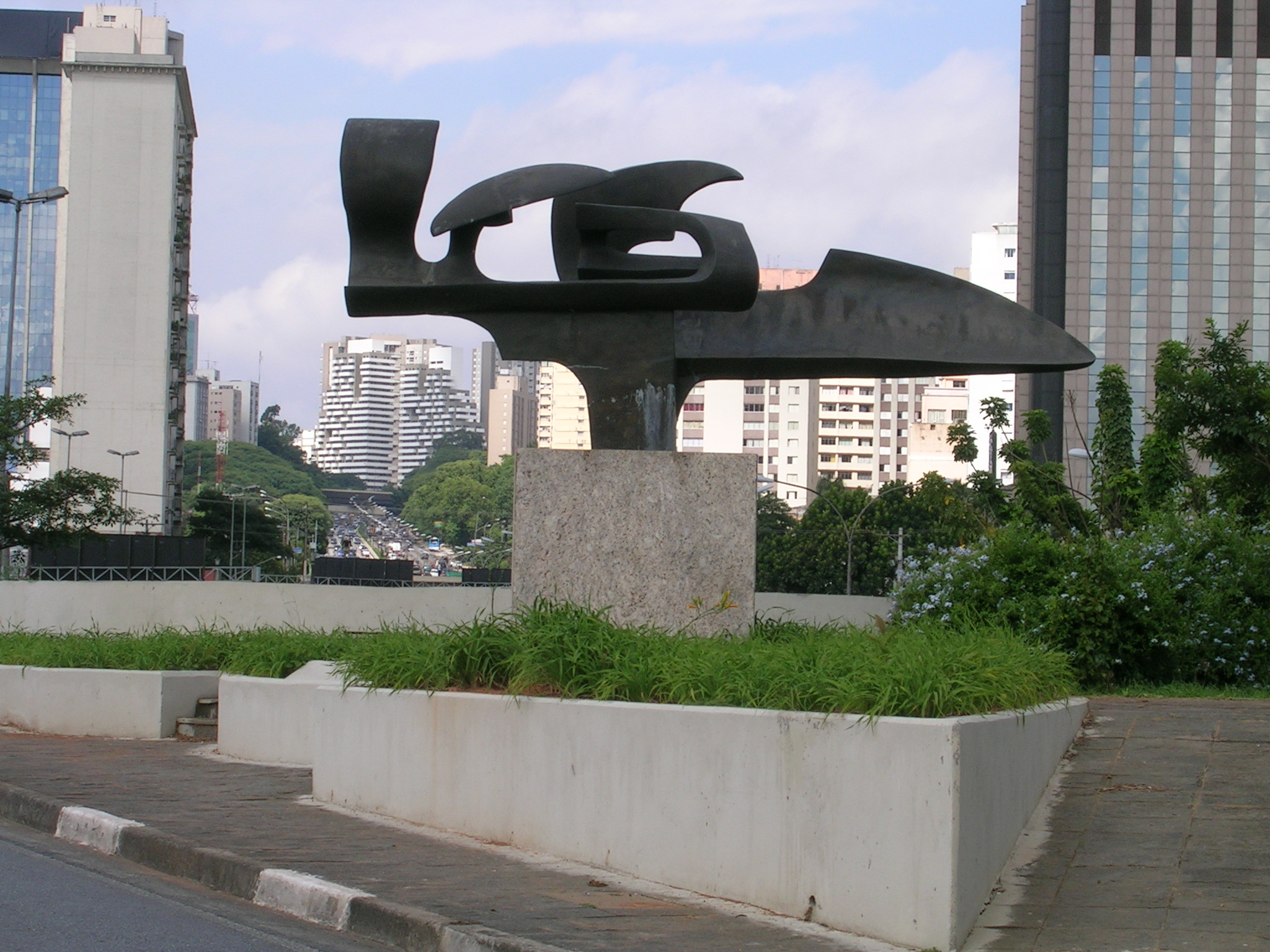
Monument to Ayrton Senna, Melinda Garcia's work, installed at the entrance of the tunnel under Ibirapuera Park, São Paulo, Brazil

Senna's body returned to Brazil on 4 May 1994. The Italian Air Force offered to fly the coffin back to Brazil, but the Senna family wished that it return home in a Brazilian plane. Contrary to airline policy and out of respect, Senna's coffin was allowed to be flown back to his home country in the passenger cabin, rather than the cargo hold, of a McDonnell-Douglas MD-11 airliner (reg. PP-VOQ) operated by national airline VARIG, accompanied by his distraught younger brother, Leonardo, and close friends. The plane was escorted by fighter jets into São Paulo–Guarulhos International Airport, where it was met by the São Paulo mayor Paulo Maluf and the state's governor Luiz Antônio Fleury Filho. Eight cadets from the Military Police Academy mounted guard as a fire engine carried the coffin on the 20-mile (32.2 km) journey into the city. Leading the motorcade were 17 police motorbikes, and 2,500 policemen lined the route to keep the crowds at bay. Senna's body lay in state at the Legislative Assembly building in Ibirapuera Park, and was visited inside the building by more than 200,000 people.

Senna's funeral took place in São Paulo on 5 May 1994. It is estimated that the whole ceremony and procession was attended by about three million people; it was the largest funeral procession in the city's history. Following the lying-in-state, a 21-gun salute was fired by the 2nd Artillery Brigade. Seven Brazilian Air Force jets flew in a diamond formation as the funeral procession made its way to Morumbi Cemetery. Senna's grave bears the epitaph "Nada pode me separar do amor de Deus", translated to "Nothing can separate me from the love of God" (Romans 8:38–39).

Many prominent motor-racing figures attended Senna's state funeral, which took place on 5 May, such as team managers Ken Tyrrell, Peter Collins, Ron Dennis, and Frank Williams, and driver-manager Jackie Stewart. The pallbearers included drivers: Gerhard Berger, Michele Alboreto, Alain Prost, Thierry Boutsen, Damon Hill, Rubens Barrichello, Roberto Moreno, Derek Warwick, Maurício Gugelmin, Hans-Joachim Stuck, Johnny Herbert, Pedro Lamy, Maurizio Sandro Sala, Raul Boesel, Emerson Fittipaldi, Wilson Fittipaldi, and Christian Fittipaldi. Neither Sid Watkins nor Jo Ramírez, the McLaren team coordinator, could bear to attend because they were so grief-stricken.

Senna's family did not allow Formula One Management president Bernie Ecclestone to attend the ceremony. They were offended that the race had not been abandoned after the accident and that Ecclestone had accidentally told Senna's brother Leonardo that Senna died on track (he did not die for several more hours). Ecclestone settled for watching the funeral cortege as an ordinary spectator. However, in more recent years, Ecclestone took some steps to repair his relationship with the Senna family, such as lending aid to the Instituto Ayrton Senna. Ecclestone has occasionally stated that Senna was the best driver he ever saw.

FISA president Max Mosley attended the funeral of Ratzenberger on 7 May in Salzburg, Austria, as he could attend only one of the two ceremonies. In a press conference ten years later, Mosley said: "I went to his funeral because everyone went to Senna's. I thought it was important that somebody went to his."

== Aftermath ==
=== Reactions ===
For the next race at Monaco, the FIA decided to leave the first two grid positions empty and painted them with the colours of the Brazilian and the Austrian flags, to honour Senna and Ratzenberger.

Five-time World Champion Juan Manuel Fangio was watching the race from his home in Balcarce, Argentina. He turned the television off almost immediately after the accident, remembering later: "I knew he was dead".

ESPN, which broadcast the San Marino Grand Prix in the United States, also carried the Alabama 500 NASCAR Cup Series race at Talladega Superspeedway in Talladega, Alabama, later the same day. On lap 103, a seven-car incident at the tri-oval led to the second yellow flag of the race. As the field was getting set to resume the event on lap 112, ESPN lead race announcer Bob Jenkins informed the audience of Senna's death. As a tribute, the ESPN booth of Jenkins, Ned Jarrett, and Benny Parsons went silent for the lap 112 restart. During his post-race interview in victory lane with Jerry Punch, race winner Dale Earnhardt offered his condolences to Senna's family and friends. Coincidentally, Earnhardt himself was fatally injured in a last-lap wreck at the 2001 Daytona 500, nearly seven years later.

In Brazil, the country's television networks spent the rest of the day interrupting their normal programming schedules to announce Senna's death and replay his last interview, given to the media on the day before the crash. Rede Globo's Domingão do Faustão and SBT's Domingo Legal both paid tributes on Senna's death. Many motor racing fans gathered outside of Maggiore Hospital to pay their respects to Senna, causing major traffic jams. Fans also gathered in the Williams F1 factory in Didcot where around 200 people attended with flowers laid on the front gates of the factory.

The Italian and Brazilian press were critical of the FIA for the rule changes that were enacted for 1994. Benetton driver Schumacher called for improvements in safety. BBC Sport commentator Murray Walker called Senna's death the "blackest day for Grand Prix racing that I can remember".

Two and a half months later, following Brazil's victory over Italy in the 1994 FIFA World Cup, the Brazilian squad dedicated their World Cup victory to Senna.

=== Safety improvements ===
The layout of the circuit was changed after the two fatal crashes at the 1994 event.

On 3 May, the FIA called a meeting at the request of the Italian Automobile Club to review the events of the weekend. Later on, the governing body announced new safety measures for the next round in Monaco which included the following three changes:

1. Entry to and exit from the pit lane would be controlled by a curve to force cars to run at a reduced speed
2. No team personnel would be allowed onto the pit lane surface except those directly involved with working on a car during a scheduled pit stop
3. A draw would be arranged to determine the scheduled order in which cars make pit stops. Stops made out of the designated order will be limited to emergencies only and cars would not be allowed to take on fuel or new tyres.

On 8 May, it was reported that Federico Bendinelli, an official who worked at Imola, said Senna had inspected the Tamburello corner and declared it was "O.K." Williams ran tests on one of their rigs attempting to replicate Senna's accident from the data retrieved. They attempted to simulate a mechanical failure which had not proven conclusive.

At the next race in Monaco, retired world champion Niki Lauda announced the reformation of the Grand Prix Drivers' Association (GPDA). The representatives elected were Lauda and active drivers Michael Schumacher, Gerhard Berger and Martin Brundle. At the end of the season, the GPDA demanded the FIA improve the safety of Formula One. The FIA responded quickly and introduced changes to the regulations as follows:

For the Spanish Grand Prix:

- the size of diffusers would be reduced;
- the front wing end plates would be raised;
- the size of the front wing would be reduced.

All together this would reduce the amount of downforce by about 15%.

For the Canadian Grand Prix:

- the lateral protection of the drivers' heads would be improved by increasing the height of the sides of the cockpit;
- the minimum weight of a Formula One car would be increased by 25 kg (changed to 15 kg by Canadian GP);
- the front wishbones would be strengthened to reduce the possibility of a front wheel coming loose and striking the driver;
- the cockpit would be lengthened to prevent drivers striking their head on the front of the cockpit;
- the use of pump petrol would be imposed;
- the airboxes from the engines would be removed to reduce the airflow to the engines and thus decrease the power available.

Other changes included improved crash barriers, redesigned tracks and tyre barriers, higher crash safety standards, higher sills on the driver cockpit and a limit on 3-litre engines. The FIA immediately investigated the Autodromo Enzo e Dino Ferrari in Imola, and the track's signature Tamburello turn was changed into a left–right chicane as a result.

In February 1995, a 500-page report by a team of judicial investigators was handed over to Italian prosecutors which attributed Senna's crash to steering column failure caused by a pre-race adjustment.

== Autopsy ==
During legal proceedings before the Italian courts on 3 March 1997, based on the expert testimony and evidence of the pathologist, Dr Cipolla, Senna's official time of death was recorded as 2:17 pm on 1 May 1994, coinciding with cerebral death under Italian law, upon Senna hitting the Tamburello wall. The FIA and Italian motorsport authorities still maintain that Senna was not killed instantly, but rather died in the hospital, where he had been rushed by helicopter after an emergency tracheotomy and IV administration were performed on the track.

There is an ongoing debate as to why Senna was not declared dead at the track. Under Italian law, collisions resulting in a fatality must be investigated for any criminal culpability. The activities that cause the fatality, such as a sporting event, must be suspended forthwith and the scene of the crash secured.

The former Director of the Porto (Portugal) Legal Medicine Institute, Professor José Eduardo Pinto da Costa, has stated the following:

From the ethical viewpoint, the procedure used for Ayrton's body was wrong. It involved dysthanasia, which means that a person has been kept alive improperly after biological death has taken place because of brain injuries so serious that the patient would never have been able to remain alive without mechanical means of support. There would have been no prospect of normal life and relationships. Whether or not Ayrton was removed from the car while his heart was beating or whether his supply of blood had halted or was still flowing, is irrelevant to the determination of when he died.

The autopsy showed that the crash caused multiple fractures at the base of the cranium, crushing the forehead and rupturing the temporal artery with haemorrhage in the respiratory passages. It is possible to resuscitate a dead person immediately after the heart stops through cardio-respiratory processes. The procedure is known as putting the patient on the machine. From the medical-legal viewpoint, in Ayrton's case, there is a subtle point: resuscitation measures were implemented.

From the ethical point of view, this might well be condemned because the measures were not intended to be of strictly medical benefit to the patient but rather because they suited the commercial interest of the organisation. Resuscitation did, in fact, take place, with the tracheotomy performed, while the activity of the heart was restored with the assistance of cardio-respiratory devices. The attitude in question was certainly controversial. Any physician would know there was no possibility whatsoever of successfully restoring life in the condition in which Senna had been found.

Professor José Pratas Vital, Director of the Egas Moniz Hospital in Lisbon, a neurosurgeon and Head of the Medical Staff at the Portuguese GP, offered a different opinion:

The people who conducted the autopsy stated that, on the evidence of his injuries, Senna was dead. They could not say that. He had injuries which led to his death, but at that point, the heart may still have been functioning. Medical personnel attending an injured person, and who perceive that the heart is still beating, have only two courses of action: One is to ensure that the patient's respiratory passages remain free, which means that he can breathe. They had to carry out an emergency tracheotomy. With oxygen and the heart beating, there is another concern, which is the loss of blood. These are the steps to be followed in any case involving serious injury, whether on the street or on a racetrack. The rescue team can think of nothing else at that moment except to assist the patient, particularly by immobilising the cervical area. Then the injured person must be taken immediately to the intensive care unit of the nearest hospital.

Rogério Morais Martins, creative director of Ayrton Senna Promotions (which became the Ayrton Senna Institute after Senna's death), stated that:

According to the first clinical bulletin read by Dr. Maria Teresa Fiandri at 4:30 pm Ayrton Senna had brain damage with haemorrhaged shock and deep coma. However, the medical staff did not note any chest or abdomen wound. The haemorrhage was caused by the rupture of the temporal artery. The neurosurgeon who examined Ayrton Senna at the hospital mentioned that the circumstances did not call for surgery because the wound was generalised in the cranium. At 6:05 pm Dr. Fiandri read another communiqué, her voice shaking, announcing that Senna was dead. At that stage he was still connected to the equipment that maintained his heartbeat.

The release by the Italian authorities of the results of Ayrton Senna's autopsy, revealing that the driver had died instantaneously during the race at Imola, ignited still more controversy. Now there were questions about the reactions of the race director and the medical authorities. Although spokespersons for the hospital had stated that Senna was still breathing on arrival in Bologna, the autopsy on Ratzenberger [who died the day before] indicated that his death had been instantaneous. Under Italian law, a death within the confines of the circuit would have required the cancellation of the entire race meeting. That, in turn, could have prevented Senna's death.

The relevant Italian legislation stipulates that when a death takes place during a sporting event, it should be immediately halted and the area sealed off for examination. In the case of Ratzenberger, this would have meant the cancellation of both Saturday's qualifying session and the San Marino Grand Prix on Sunday.

Medical experts are unable to state whether or not Ayrton Senna died instantaneously. Nevertheless, they were well aware that his chances of survival were slight. Had he remained alive, the brain damage would have left him severely handicapped. Collisions such as this are almost always fatal, with survivors suffering irreversible brain damage. This is a result of the effects on the brain of sudden deceleration, which causes structural damage to the brain tissues. Estimates of the forces involved in Ayrton's crash suggest a rate of deceleration equivalent to a 30-metre vertical drop, landing head-first. Evidence offered at the autopsy revealed that the impact of this 208 km/h crash caused multiple injuries at the base of the cranium, resulting in respiratory insufficiency.

There was crushing of the brain (which was forced against the wall of the cranium causing oedema and haemorrhage, increasing intra-cranial pressure and causing brain death), alongside rupture of the temporal artery, haemorrhage in the respiratory passages and the consequent heart failure.

There are two opposing theories on the issue of whether the drivers were still alive when they were put in the helicopters that carried them to hospital. Assuming both Ratzenberger and Senna had died instantaneously, the race organisers might have delayed any announcement in order to avoid being forced to cancel the meeting, thus protecting their financial interests.

Had the meeting been cancelled, Sagis – the organisation which administers the Imola circuit – stood to lose an estimated US$6.5 million ($14.1 million in 2025).

== Investigation and trial ==
The Williams team was entangled for many years in Italian criminal court proceedings after prosecutors instigated manslaughter charges against key team officials. The charges focused on the car's steering column, which was found broken at a point where a modification had been made. The prosecution argued that a welded joint had fatigued and failed causing the crash, while the Williams team contended that it had broken on impact. During the 1994 pre-season, Senna had asked his team to alter the car's steering position. The team agreed to Senna's request by having the FW16's steering column cut and extended with a smaller-diameter piece of tubing that was welded together with reinforcing plates. The modification was carried out in this manner as there was insufficient time to manufacture a new steering shaft.

A 600-page technical report was submitted by the University of Bologna under Professor of Engineering Enrico Lorenzini and his team of specialists. The report concluded that fatigue cracks had developed through most of the steering column at the point where it had broken. Lorenzini stated: "It had been badly welded together about a third of the way down and couldn't stand the strain of the race. We discovered scratches on the crack in the steering rod. It seemed like the job had been done in a hurry but I can't say how long before the race. Someone had tried to smooth over the joint following the welding. I have never seen anything like it. I believe the rod was faulty and probably cracked even during the warm-up. Moments before the crash, only a tiny piece was left connected and, therefore, the car didn't respond in the bend."

In the expert report submitted to the court by Professor Lorenzini, it reads: "In general terms, it must be said that the three-piece steering column is indicative of a poorly designed modification, as the thinness of the section precisely at the point of maximum stress, the abrupt change in cross-section with an excessively small fillet radius, and the scratches caused by the mechanical processes of drilling and turning all contribute to creating a structurally critical situation, with a consequent high risk of failure under static loads and dynamic fatigue." Professor of Industrial Chemistry Gian Paolo Cammarota later stated: “Reducing the diameter of the tube was a major design mistake... There was only partial polishing on the outside – it should have been mirror-finished – and inside, nothing had been done at all. The crack definitely started from the inside, probably already during practice.”

An analysis of the onboard camera video was submitted by Cineca, which tracked the movement of the steering wheel during the race. Having rotated in a fixed arc during the previous laps, during the final seconds a yellow button on the wheel moved several centimetres away from its normal trajectory, with the steering wheel tilting in its own plane, indicating a breaking steering column. Williams introduced its own video to prove the movement was normal in which David Coulthard manhandled an FW16B steering wheel, the effort required to deflect the wheel termed as "quite considerable". Michele Alboreto testified that the steering wheel movement was abnormal, stating that the video "proves that something was broken in Senna's Williams. No steering wheel moves a few centimetres."

On 16 December 1997, Frank Williams and five others were acquitted of the charges, ending the threat of a boycott of Formula One in Italy. In a 381-page ruling, Judge Antonio Costanzo concluded that steering column failure was the probable cause of Senna's crash; however, there was no proof of negligence on the part of Head or Newey, or that they had designed the modifications in the first place.

On 22 November 1999, the Bologna court of appeal upheld the acquittals, rejecting a request from prosecutors to give one-year suspended sentences to Head and Newey. In April 2002, Senna's FW16 chassis number 02 was returned to the Williams team. Although an initial report by Autosport stated the car had been destroyed by the team (as it was in an advanced state of deterioration), a spokesman stated otherwise, but also stated that the car's ultimate fate would be a 'private matter'. Newey later wrote that the car was crushed. Senna's helmet was returned to Bell, and was incinerated. The car's engine was returned to Renault, where its fate is unknown.

In January 2003, at the request of prosecutors, the Italian Supreme Court reopened the case, ruling that "material errors" had been made in the Bologna court of appeal. On 27 May 2005, the court gave a full acquittal to Adrian Newey, while the case against Head was "timed out" under a statute of limitations. A retrial was ordered by Italy's highest court in 2005.

On 13 April 2007, the Italian Supreme Court of Cassation delivered its own verdict (number 15050) stating that: "It has been determined that the accident was caused by a steering column failure. This failure was caused by badly designed and badly executed modifications. The responsibility for this falls on Patrick Head, culpable of omitted control". However, Head was not arrested since the Italian statute of limitations for culpable homicide was 7 years and 6 months, and the verdict was pronounced 13 years after the crash.

== Other viewpoints ==
Patrick Head, technical director of Williams, believed that Senna had made a driving error. Michael Schumacher had told him after the race that Senna's car looked 'nervous' the previous lap. Damon Hill said he is convinced that Senna made a mistake.

In May 2011, Williams FW16 designer Adrian Newey expressed his views about the crash:

The honest truth is that no one will ever know exactly what happened. There's no doubt the steering column failed and the big question was whether it failed in the accident or did it cause the accident? It had fatigue cracks and would have failed at some point. There is no question that its design was very poor. However, all the evidence suggests the car did not go off the track as a result of steering column failure... If you look at the camera shots, especially from Michael Schumacher's following car, the car didn't understeer off the track. It oversteered which is not consistent with a steering column failure. The rear of the car stepped out and all the data suggests that happened. Ayrton then corrected that by going to 50% throttle which would be consistent with trying to reduce the rear stepping out and then, half-a-second later, he went hard on the brakes. The question then is why did the rear step out? The car bottomed much harder on that second lap which again appears to be unusual because the tyre pressure should have come up by then – which leaves you expecting that the right rear tyre probably picked up a puncture from debris on the track. If I was pushed into picking out a single most likely cause that would be it.

== See also ==
- List of Formula One fatalities
- Senna, a 2010 documentary film about his life on the track including footage of the crash
