= Siena School =

The Siena School

Location
- Silver Spring, Maryland; United States
- 39°1′0″N 77°1′52″W

Information
- Type: Private
- Established: 2006
- Grades: 3-12
- Enrollment: 185
- Colors: Red and black
- Mascot: Wiley the Wildcat
- Team name: Siena Wildcats
- Website: www.thesienaschool.org

The Siena School is a private 3rd–12th grade school headquartered in Silver Spring, Maryland and Oakton, Virginia. In 2021, Siena opened a second campus for grades 3–8 in Oakton, Northern Virginia, and in 2024 Siena opened a satellite campus in Silver Spring for grades 3-4. The school's mission is to prepare "bright, college-bound students with language-based learning disabilities [a.k.a.: learning differences], such as dyslexia, to become confident, curious learners who understand their personal strengths and gain the tools and strategies to excel."

== History ==
The Siena School was founded in 2006, serving students in grades 5–9. They were originally located at the Montgomery Hills Baptist Church along Georgia Avenue in Silver Spring, MD. In 2008, Siena became fully accredited by the Middle States Association of Colleges and Schools. By the 2012–13 school year, Siena had school expanded to serve students in grades 4–12, and moved into its location on Forest Glen Road in 2013. Siena opened a second campus for grades 3–8 in Oakton, Virginia, in 2021 and a satellite campus in Silver Spring for grades 3-4 in 2024.

Siena is accredited by the Middle States Association of Colleges and Schools Commissions on Elementary and Secondary Schools (MSA-CESS). The school's namesake is Siena, Italy for two reasons: (1) this Tuscan city is well known for its art, a theme which Siena incorporates into its day-to-day curriculum, and (2) Catherine of Siena, their patron saint, did not learn to read until later in life and often used accommodations like dictation.

== Academics ==
The Siena School's curriculum is framed around the Common Core Standards and National Standards. Multisensory techniques, experiential learning, and guest speakers are key components of every class. Siena's arts program includes studio art, photography, and music classes, and spans across all divisions. Students participate in the arts every day as they are often strong visual learners. A yearly tuition costs between $50,847 and $51,496. (As of the 2024 to 2025 school year)
