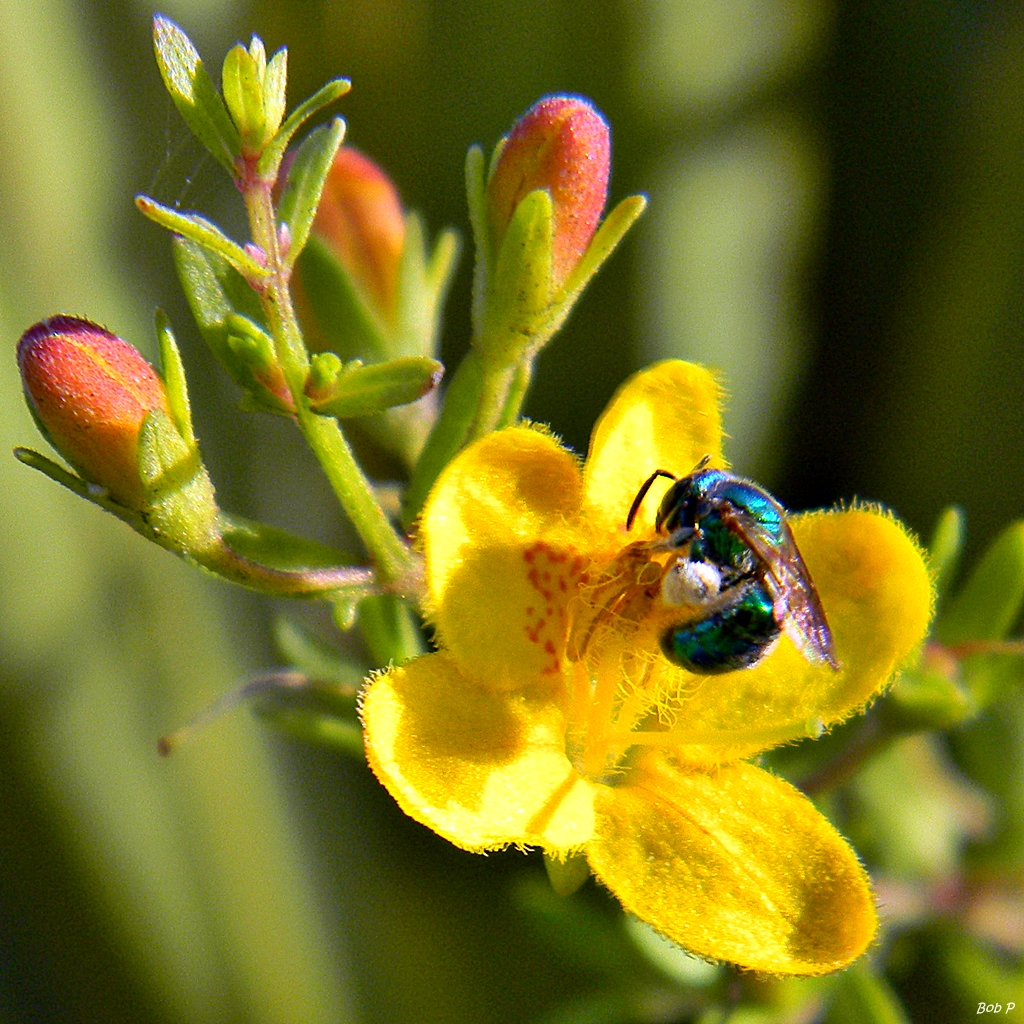
- Seymeria pectinata

Scientific classification
- Kingdom: Plantae
- Clade: Tracheophytes
- Clade: Angiosperms
- Clade: Eudicots
- Clade: Asterids
- Order: Lamiales
- Family: Orobanchaceae
- Genus: Seymeria; Pursh

Synonyms
- Afzelia J.F.Gmel.

= Seymeria =

Genus of flowering plant

Seymeria is a genus of flowering plants belonging to the family Orobanchaceae.

Its native range is from southern USA (in the states of Alabama, Arizona, Arkansas, Florida, Georgia, Louisiana, Mississippi, North Carolina, South Carolina, Tennessee, Texas and Virginia) to Mexico and the Bahamas.

The genus name of Seymeria is in honour of Henry Seymer (1745–1800), an English amateur botanist. It was first described and published in Fl. Amer. (Sept. 2) on page 736 in 1813.

== Known species ==
According to Kew:

- Seymeria anita E.Carranza & C.Medina
- Seymeria bipinnatisecta Seem.
- Seymeria cassioides (J.F.Gmel.) S.F.Blake
- Seymeria coahuilana (Pennell) Standl.
- Seymeria cualana B.L.Turner
- Seymeria decurva Benth.
- Seymeria deflexa Eastw.
- Seymeria falcata B.L.Turner
- Seymeria gypsophila B.L.Turner
- Seymeria integrifolia Greenm.
- Seymeria laciniata (M.Martens & Galeotti) Standl.
- Seymeria mazatecana B.L.Turner
- Seymeria pailana B.L.Turner
- Seymeria pectinata Pursh
- Seymeria pennellii B.L.Turner
- Seymeria scabra A.Gray
- Seymeria sinaloana (Pennell) Standl.
- Seymeria tamaulipana B.L.Turner
- Seymeria virgata (Kunth) Benth.
