= Sena Oura National Park =

National park in Chad

- IUCN category II (national park)
- Location within Chad
- Location: Chad
- Coordinates: 9°05′45″N 14°35′38″E
- Area: 735.2 km^{2} (283.9 mi^{2})
- Established: 2010

Sena Oura National Park (French: Parc National Sena Oura) is a protected area with national park status in the African country of Chad. It was established in 2010 in the Mayo-Dallah Department of the western region of Mayo-Kebbi, on the border with Cameroon, created with the entry into force of Law 16 in an area of 735.2 km^{2}. Form, together with the Bouba Ndjida National Park of Cameroon, a biosphere corridor. It is classified in Category II by IUCN. The administration of the park was entrusted to the authorities and representatives of the local tribes.

The history that led to the creation of the national park dates back to the mid-1980s when a large part of the eastern civilian population, shaken by civil war, arrived in the quieter regions of the West. With the increase in population, the pressure on the country's natural resources was reflected in a decline in forestry, in overfishing in lakes and rivers, and in soil fertility. To counteract this scenario, in 1995, authorities and local natives signed the Dari agreement, which decided to protect the forest in the region. In 2002, the Ministry of Environment and Regional Administration of Chad agreed to select an area to transform it into a nature reserve. The project was funded by the German Society for International Cooperation (Deutsche Gesellschaft für Internationale Zusammenarbeit.) and a French company. In 2007, it was decided to declare the area of the Sena Oura National Park under Law 14 and contribute to the development of a transboundary biosphere reserve, together with the nearby Bouba Ndjida National Park. In 2008, the National Parliament approved this law and after two years of preparation, in 2010 there was the official birth of the national park.

The Sena Oura National Park is located in the East Sudanian savanna ecoregion that crosses Chad and therefore contains open forest with tall trees, thick bushes, thick tall grasses and woody shrubs. There are 16 species of endangered animals in the national park, including the African elephant (Loxodonta africana), the lion (Panthera leo) and the cheetah (Acinonyx jubatus).
