= Kooba =

New York handbag company

Kooba is a brand of contemporary handbags designed and owned by New York designer Abby Held.

== History ==
The brand was launched in 1998 by the mother-daughter team of Bonnie and Abbe Held. Lynn Pincus joined them in 2000.

In 2007, private equity firm Swander Pace Capital made an undisclosed investment in the company and is now the majority stakeholder.

== Products ==
The bags are often crafted from leather. Bags are often named after celebrities and other notable figures. One of the brand's best selling bags is the Sienna, named for actress Sienna Miller.

Bags range in price from $200 to $700 and are sold through high-end retailers such as Barneys New York, Henri Bendel, and Neiman Marcus.

In 2007, Kooba launched a collection of contemporary fall tops. The brand also sells jackets and outerwear.

Because of the popularity of the Kooba brand and the high prices attached to their products, there is a significant amount of counterfeit merchandise produced and sold, some of which ends up on online retail and auction websites such as eBay.

== In popular culture ==
Celebrities who are known to own a Kooba handbag include actresses Jennifer Aniston, Sienna Miller and Kristen Bell, as well as singer Avril Lavigne.

Kooba bags appear on a number of television shows on the Bravo network including "The Fashion Show" and "NYC Prep." Kooba designed exclusive colors for its bags, and the cast members got to pick their favorite. The bags were sold on Bravo's website.
