= Guilherme Beléa =

Brazilian footballer (born 2001)

Personal information
- Full name: Guilherme Preto Beléa Molinaris Cardoso
- Date of birth: 13 July 2001 (age 25)
- Place of birth: Sapucaia do Sul, Brazil
- Height: 1.80 m (5 ft 11 in)
- Positions: Left winger; right winger

Team information
- Current team: São José

Youth career
- 2018–2019: Verê
- 2019–2021: Grêmio

Senior career*
Years	Team	Apps	(Gls)
2021–2022	Grêmio	0	(0)
2021	→ Aimoré (loan)	0	(0)
2022	→ Ypiranga (loan)	2	(0)
2022–2023	Sporting da Covilhã	11	(0)
2023	Brasil de Pelotas	17	(3)
2023–	São José	5	(1)
- * Club domestic league appearances and goals as of 16 September 2023

Guilherme Preto Beléa Molinaris Cardoso (born 13 July 2001), commonly known as Guilherme Beléa, is a Brazilian professional footballer who plays as a left-winger and right-winger for São José.

== Club career ==
=== Grêmio ===
Born in Sapucaia do Sul, Brazil, Guilherme Beléa joined the Grêmio's Academy at the age of 17 in 2019.

== Career statistics ==
=== Club ===
As of 26 May 2021.

Appearances and goals by club, season and competition
Club	Season	League			National Cup		Continental		Other		Total	
Club	Season	Division	Apps	Goals	Apps	Goals	Apps	Goals	Apps	Goals	Apps	Goals
Grêmio	2021	Série A	—		—		—		—		0	0
Grêmio	Total		0	0	0	0	0	0	0	0	0	0
Aimoré (loan)	2021	Série D	—		—		—		8 (Note: Appearance(s) in Campeonato Gaúcho.)	1	8	1
Aimoré (loan)	Total		0	0	0	0	0	0	8	1	8	1
Career total			0	0	0	0	0	0	8	1	8	1
