= Yang Sena =

South Korean footballer

Yang Se-na
Personal information
- Date of birth: 30 January 1999 (age 27)
- Place of birth: Osaka, Osaka, Japan
- Height: 1.78 m (5 ft 10 in)
- Position: Midfielder

Team information
- Current team: Sanjoanense

Youth career
- 2008–2011: Osaka Korea
- 2011–2013: Higashi Osaka
- 2014–2016: Sagan Tosu
- 2017–2019: Saint Andrew's University
- 2019–2020: Braga
- 2020–2021: Académico de Viseu

Senior career*
Years	Team	Apps	(Gls)
2021	Académico de Viseu	1	(0)
2021–2023	Covilhã	8	(0)
2023–	Sanjoanense	0	(0)
- * Club domestic league appearances and goals as of 26 August 2023

- Yang Sena
- Hangul: 양세나
- RR: Yang Sena
- MR: Yang Sena

Yang Sena (Korean: 양세나; born 30 January 1999) is a South Korean professional footballer who plays as a midfielder for Portuguese Liga 3 club Sanjoanense.

== Career statistics ==
=== Club ===
As of match played 25 May 2023

Club	Season	League			National cup		League cup		Other		Total	
Club	Season	Division	Apps	Goals	Apps	Goals	Apps	Goals	Apps	Goals	Apps	Goals
Académico de Viseu	2020–21	Liga Portugal 2	1	0	0	0	—		—		1	0
Covilhã	2021–22	Liga Portugal 2	2	0	0	0	1	0	0	0	3	0
Covilhã	2022–23	Liga Portugal 2	6	0	0	0	3	0	—		9	0
Covilhã	Total		8	0	0	0	4	0	0	0	12	0
Sanjoanense	2023–24	Liga 3	0	0	0	0	—		—		0	0
Career total			9	0	0	0	4	0	0	0	13	0
