= Siena College (Tennessee) =

Coordinates: 35.1173°N 89.9168°W

Siena College was a private, Catholic college located in Memphis, Tennessee. It was established by Dominican nuns in 1922 as St. Agnes College, the first Catholic women's college in the Diocese of Nashville and in the Memphis metro area.

== History ==
The Sisters of St. Dominic based in Springfield, Kentucky, opened St. Agnes Academy in Memphis in 1851. When the same order opened a college department in 1922, it was the first Catholic women's school in the Memphis area, and the first college in Memphis to offer adult evening courses. The first student to complete a four-year degree at St. Agnes College was Mary Emma Flautt in 1926. The school's peak enrollment was 350 students.

In 1939, the Saint Agnes Academy moved to a new campus (where it remains), and the name of St. Agnes College was changed to Siena College. The college eventually was moved to its own new campus on Poplar Avenue in 1953 where it operated until it closed in 1972.

== Legacy ==
Despite not officially merging with another Catholic college in Memphis, Christian Brothers University (CBU), the two schools shared some facilities and courses in the 1960s. CBU changed from being an all-male college to a coeducational institution in 1972. Many Siena students became the first female students at CBU.

The former location of the St. Agnes Academy and Siena College housed specialized educational programs and a halfway house in the 1970s. In 1985, the site was rezoned for commercial development, and the Oak Court retail and office complex was built on the schools' site.
