= Stephen Knowles =

British Formula One engineer

- Education: University of Bath
- Occupation: Engineer
- Employer: Red Bull Racing
- Known for: Formula One engineer
- Title: Lead Engineer - Strategy and Sporting

Stephen Knowles is a British Formula One engineer. He is currently the Lead Engineer - Strategy and Sporting at the Red Bull Racing Formula One team.

== Career ==
Knowles studied mechanical engineering at the University of Bath. He began his Formula One career with Mercedes in 2012 as a graduate in the strategy department. He progressed steadily through the group, becoming a Race Strategy Engineer and later Senior Strategy Engineer. Initially factory-based, he began travelling to races in 2015. In 2016 he was seconded to the now-defunct Manor Racing team as Chief Strategist trackside, leading race strategy operations for the season. He returned to Mercedes in 2017 as a Pitwall Strategist, contributing to the team's championship-winning campaigns during the hybrid era. Seeking a new challenge, Knowles joined Red Bull Racing during the 2021 season as part of the strategy department. From 2022 he worked full-time trackside, and at the season-ending 2022 Abu Dhabi Grand Prix he led race strategy for the first time.

Across the 2023 and 2024 seasons he was a regular presence on the pit wall alongside Will Courtenay and Hannah Schmitz, sharing strategy lead and support duties on a rotating basis. In September 2024, following a restructuring of the race team, Knowles was promoted to Head of Sporting while continuing his involvement in race strategy operations beginning from 2025. In this role Knowles assumed responsibility for overseeing the team's sporting framework, including regulatory compliance, liaison with the FIA and Formula One Management, and coordination of operational procedures across race weekends. In 2026, his title was further renamed to ‘Lead Engineer - Strategy and Sporting’.
