= Laura Müller =

Laura Müller may refer to:

- Laura Müller (sprinter), German sprinter
- Laura Müller (field hockey), Chilean field hockey player
- Laura Müller (motorsport), German Formula One race engineer
- Laura Raquel Müller, German long jumper
- Laura Taleb Muller, Algerian footballer
