= Krystina Emmanouilides =

Greek-Australian computational fluid dynamics engineer (born 1991)

Krystina Emmanouilides (born 1991) is a Greek-Australian computational fluid dynamics (CFD) engineer, working for the Stake Formula 1 Sauber Team.

== Education ==
In 2013, Emmanouilides earned her bachelor's degree in motorsport engineering from Oxford Brookes University in England and in 2014, she completed her master's degree from Durham University, focusing on motorsport tyre heat transfer and aerodynamics.

== Career ==
Before starting her journey in Formula One, she was a vehicle dynamics engineer at Jaguar Land Rover. She has been working for Sauber since 2018.

She is an ambassador for the Motorsport Australia FIA Girls on Track program, and previously served as an ambassador for Racing Pride, during which she also served on the Board of Directors. In these roles she is an advocate for diversity and inclusion in the motorsport industry. She has supported grassroots initiatives like We Race as One.

In 2022, she was nominated for the "Female Engineer of the Year" award presented by McLaren Applied. She was nominated alongside Hannah Schmitz and Charlotte Phelps.

== Personal life ==
She grew up in Melbourne, Australia. She is a lesbian. She currently resides in Zurich, Switzerland.
