= Will Courtenay =

British Formula One engineer

- Occupation: Engineer
- Employer: McLaren Racing
- Known for: Formula One engineer
- Title: Sporting director

Will Courtenay is a British Formula One engineer. He is currently the Sporting Director for the McLaren Racing Formula One team.

== Career ==
Courtenay studied at the University of Cambridge, where he graduated in 2002 with a Master of Engineering (MEng) degree.

After graduating, he began his career at TRW Inc., working as a software programmer. His move into motorsport came when he joined Jaguar Racing as a systems engineer.

When Jaguar was purchased and rebranded as Red Bull Racing in 2005, Courtenay transitioned into the team’s strategy department. Over the following years, he became one of Red Bull’s key strategic minds, helping shape the team’s race-day decision-making. In 2010, he was promoted to Head of Strategy, working closely with race engineers and team management during Red Bull’s dominant championship years.

Courtenay later shared race strategy duties with Hannah Schmitz, with the pair alternating between trackside strategy responsibilities and remote support from the team’s operations room at Milton Keynes.

In 2024, it was announced that Courtenay would leave Red Bull Racing to join McLaren Racing as the team’s new Sporting Director. Initially contracted to remain with Red Bull until mid-2026, Courtenay was subsequently released from his contract earlier during the winter break of 2025 which allowed him to join McLaren starting from the 2026 season.
