= Hannah Schmitz =

British engineer (born 1985)

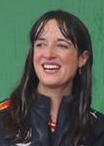
- Schmitz in 2019
- Born: Hannah McMillan; 2 May 1985 (age 41); England
- Citizenship: British
- Education: University of Cambridge
- Occupation: Engineer
- Employer: Oracle Red Bull Racing
- Known for: Formula One engineer

Hannah Schmitz (née McMillan; born 2 May 1985) is a British engineer, currently working as Head of Race Strategy for Formula One team Red Bull Racing. She is widely regarded as one of the most successful female figures in the sport of Formula One, heralded as key in Red Bull's 2022 and 2023 Constructor's Championships and Max Verstappen's four consecutive Driver's Championships from 2021 to 2024.

== Education ==
In 2009, Schmitz obtained a master's degree in Mechanical Engineering from the University of Cambridge, with a focus on optimization theory, regression analysis, and statistical models. At university, Schmitz was part of the Cambridge University Eco Racing (CUER) team, taking on the role of Mechanical Team Leader. She led the CUER team in the World Solar Challenge in Australia.

== Career ==
Following the completion of her studies, Schmitz began her career working for Red Bull Racing in November 2009 as a Modelling and Strategy Engineer, where she mainly researched and developed new simulation techniques, and maintained simulation tools for analysis, producing regular testing reports on past performances and future strategies. She then moved to the role of Senior Strategy Engineer in 2011, where she played a key role in Red Bull Racing's live strategy in all Grands Prix as an indispensable member of its team. In 2021, Schmitz was promoted to Principal Strategy Engineer. From 2026, Schmitz was promoted to Head of Race Strategy, succeeding Will Courtenay, who departed Red Bull Racing to join McLaren. As of 2026, she remains with Red Bull Racing.

Schmitz is known for her strategic decision-making skills, communication, and ability to remain composed under high stress situations. She is credited for her contributions to Max Verstappen's race win at the 2019 Brazilian Grand Prix, Checo Perez's victory at the 2022 Monaco Grand Prix, and Verstappen's victories at the 2022 Hungarian Grand Prix and 2022 Dutch Grand Prix, as well as the 2025 Qatar Grand Prix.

Schmitz is one of the few women to have stood on the Formula One podium to accept the constructors' trophy. She has been on the podium for the Brazilian Grand Prix in 2019 and the Qatar Grand Prix in 2025.

Ahead of the 2026 Australian Grand Prix, Schmitz and Laura Müller, Race Engineer for Haas driver Esteban Ocon, had Turn 6 at the Albert Park Circuit dedicated to them. They are the first women to have a corner dedicated to them at a race track, and the 'In Her Corner' initiative aims to recognize the contributions of women in motorsport. The race weekend also coincided with International Women's Day on March 8.

== Personal life ==
She is married to a German husband, Markus Schmitz, with whom she shares two daughters (born in 2019 and 2021). She attended Croydon High School, where she excelled at water polo.

Schmitz has stated that her favourite racing memory is from the 2019 Brazilian Grand Prix, where she and the team decided to pit Verstappen under the safety car, initially losing the lead to Lewis Hamilton before regaining the position and winning the race. It was also the first time she stood on the podium to receive the constructors' trophy.

== Awards ==
In 2022, Schmitz was awarded Female Engineer of the Year, an award created by McLaren Applied to recognize inspiring female pioneers in motorsport. Fellow nominees included Krystina Emmanouilides and Charlotte Phelps.
