= Laura Müller (motorsport) =

First female Formula One race engineer

- Born: 1991 or 1992 (age 34–35)
- Education: Technical University of Munich
- Occupation: Race engineer
- Employer: Haas F1 Team

Laura Müller (alternatively spelled Mueller) is a German race engineer for Haas F1 Team. Since the 2025 Formula One season, Müller has served as Esteban Ocon's race engineer, becoming the first female full-time race engineer in Formula One history.

== Personal life and education ==
Müller is from Lake Constance, Germany. She received bachelor's and master's degrees in automotive engineering from the Technical University of Munich.

Müller grew interested in professional motorsports after spending a gap year in Australia and learning about the local supercharger car culture. She has supported events for International Women in Engineering Day by providing insights on her experience as a woman in motorsport as well as her career and subject interests. She is a fan of Michael Schumacher and Test cricket.

== Career ==
=== Early roles ===
Müller started her career as an intern for Phoenix Racing. She worked for a variety of teams in assorted competitions, including Formula Renault 2.0 (Josef Kaufmann Racing), Stock Car Brasil (Hero Motorsport), the FIA World Endurance Championship (Racing Team Nederland), the European Le Mans Series (Algarve Pro Racing and DragonSpeed), and Deutsche Tourenwagen Masters (Abt Sportsline and Manthey Racing). During her time with Abt, she served as race engineer for German driver Sophia Flörsch.

=== Haas ===
Müller joined Haas in 2022, starting in the simulator department before working her way up to supporting roles at races. During the 2024 season, she served as a performance engineer, helping the race engineer optimise the car setup and other matters for each race.

In January 2025, Haas announced that the 33-year-old Müller had been promoted to race engineer for Esteban Ocon; she is the first female full-time race engineer in Formula One history. She was promoted as part of a broader shakeup in Haas' race strategy department; team principal Ayao Komatsu said that he wanted to improve the team's trackside operations. Ocon has praised her for her strong work ethic. Müller reports to chief race engineer Francesco Nenci.

Müller and Hannah Schmitz, Head of Race Strategy for Red Bull, are the first women to have a corner at a race circuit dedicated to them. Organizers of the 2026 Australian Grand Prix named Turn 6 at the Albert Park Circuit 'In Her Corner' to recognize Müller and Schmitz's achievements as women in motorsport; the race also coincided with International Women's Day.
