= List of Formula One fatalities =

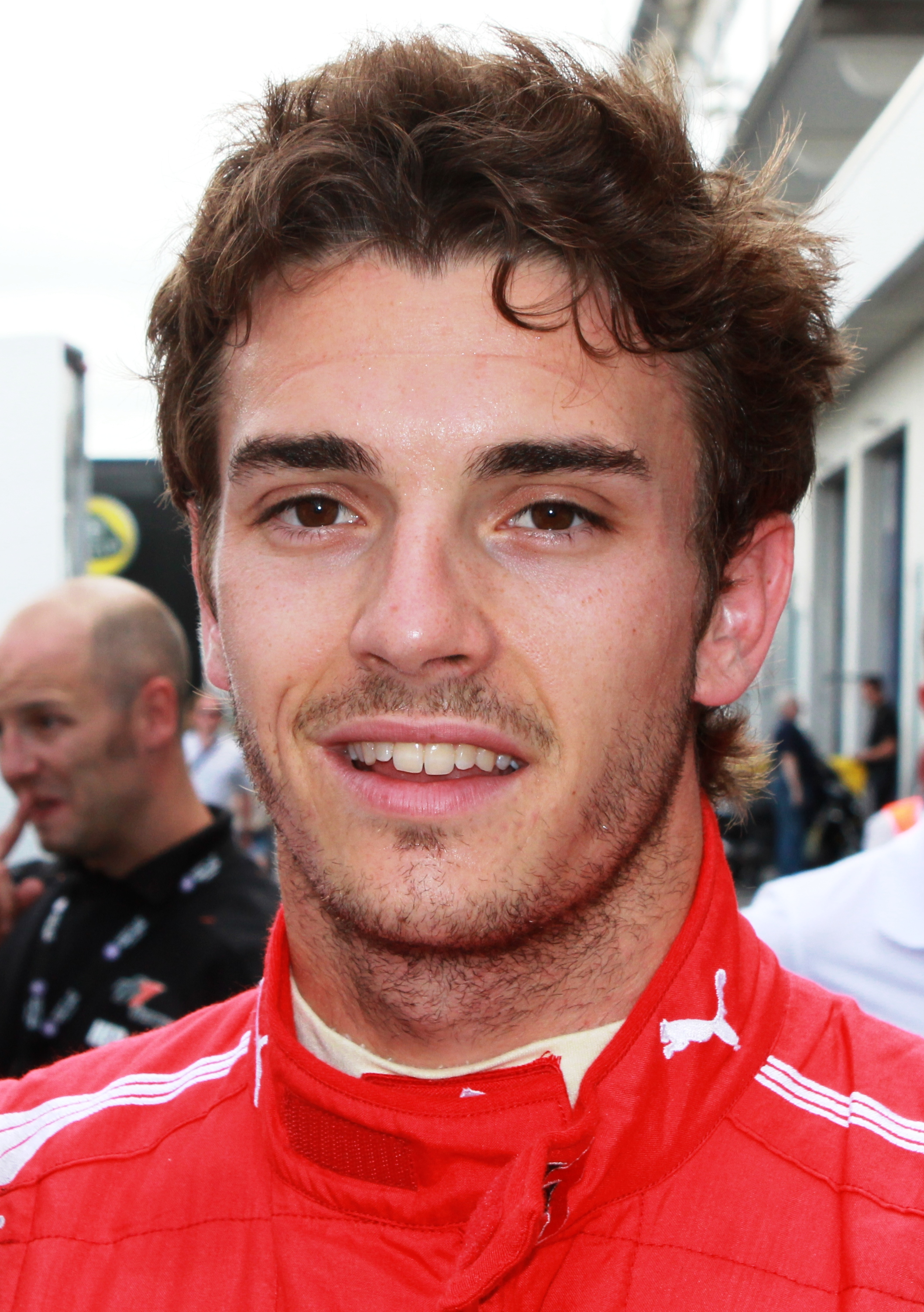
Jules Bianchi is the most recent fatality resulting from a World Championship race incident, he died on 17 July 2015, nine months after injuries sustained at the 2014 Japanese Grand Prix.

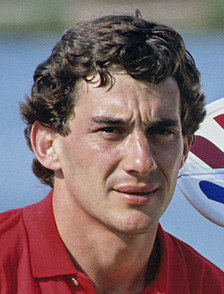
Three-time World Champion Ayrton Senna suffered a fatal accident at the 1994 San Marino Grand Prix.

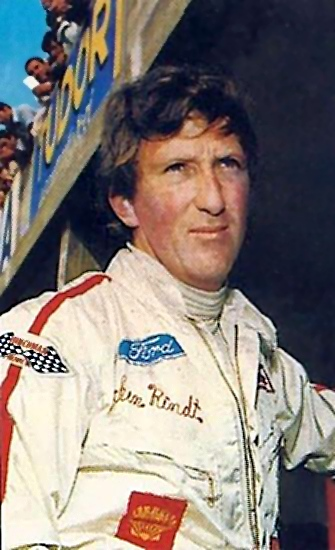
Jochen Rindt won the 1970 World Championship posthumously after fatally crashing during qualifying at the Italian Grand Prix.

Formula One (F1) is the highest class of open-wheeled auto racing defined by the Fédération Internationale de l'Automobile (FIA), motorsport's world governing body. The "formula" in the name refers to a set of rules to which all participants and vehicles must conform. The F1 World Championship season consists of a series of races, known as Grands Prix, held usually on purpose-built circuits, and in a few cases on closed city streets. The results of each race are combined to determine two annual Championships, one for drivers and one for constructors.

Safety standards have improved since the first World Championship Grand Prix at Silverstone in 1950, where there was no medical back-up nor safety measures in case of an accident. Helmets were not made mandatory until 1952, though these were simple cork-lined helmets with no visors. It was not until the 1960s that robust full-visor helmets were made mandatory, along with fireproof overalls, and the FIA assumed responsibility for safety at the circuits. Steps were taken to improve the safety of the Formula One car in the 1970s; the cockpit opening was enlarged allowing the driver to escape more quickly in the event of an accident and outside mirrors became mandatory. The 1980s saw further improvement in the structure of the Formula One car, with the monocoque being made out of carbon fibre instead of aluminium, increasing protection upon impact. Following the death of Ayrton Senna in 1994, a number of measures were introduced in an attempt to slow the cars down, including bodywork aerodynamic limitations, a pit lane speed limit and temporary circuit modifications such as extra chicanes. Grooved tyres were introduced in 1998 instead of racing slick tyres to reduce cornering speed. Safety measures continued to be introduced into the 21st century, with a number of circuits having their configuration changed to improve driver safety.

This list includes drivers who have died during a FIA World Championship event (including practice, qualifying and the race), and those who have died while driving modern or vintage Formula One cars outside the World Championship. Track marshals and other race attendees who have died as a result of these accidents are not included in the list. Fifty-two drivers have died from incidents that occurred at a FIA World Championship event or while driving a Formula One car at another event, with Cameron Earl being the first in 1952. Thirty-three of the drivers died from incidents during Grand Prix race weekends which formed part of the World Championship, six died during test sessions, and thirteen driving Formula One cars during non-championship Formula One weekends or vintage/historic events. The Indianapolis Motor Speedway has seen the most fatalities; seven drivers have died there during the time that the Indianapolis 500 formed part of the world championship, though the Indianapolis 500 was held to AAA regulations rather than Formula One regulations. Fifteen drivers died in the 1950s; fourteen in the 1960s; twelve in the 1970s; four in the 1980s and two in the 1990s. Following the deaths of Roland Ratzenberger and Ayrton Senna at Imola on consecutive days in 1994, no driver died during world championship events for more than 20 years until Jules Bianchi's death in 2015, from injuries sustained during the 2014 Japanese Grand Prix. Three drivers died in the intervening years while driving former Formula One cars (two from the 1960s, one from the 1990s) in vintage racing and other events not associated with World Championship Grands Prix. Two Formula One Champions have died while racing or practising in Formula One, Jochen Rindt in 1970, and Senna in 1994. Rindt was not a champion at the time of his death, but won the 1970 championship posthumously, the only driver to have done so.

== Fatalities ==
=== Detail by driver ===
†	Indicates event was not part of the Formula One World Championship, such as official non-championship Formula One events (Note: Non-championship events, organized by Formula One as officially-sanctioned events during a regular season, were discontinued after the 1983 Race of Champions) and unassociated events using vintage Formula One cars.
‡	Indicates test drive of a Formula One car that was not part of any competitive event. (Note: Fatalities during a test drive of a Formula One car that was not part of any competitive event. The first such fatality was an automotive engineer testing a team car during a Formula One season, while all others were then-current Formula One drivers testing their team car during a Formula One season.)
#	Indicates driver drove a Formula Two car.

Fatalities by name
Driver	Date of accident	Age	Event	Circuit	Car	Session	Ref.
Cameron Earl (UK)	June 18, 1952	29	Test‡	MIRA	ERA	Test	
Chet Miller (USA)	May 15, 1953	50	Indianapolis 500 (Note: From 1950 to 1960, the Indianapolis 500 was part of the World Drivers' Championship, though the Indianapolis 500 was held to AAA regulations rather than Formula One regulations. During those 11 years, only once did a regular Formula One driver enter an Indianapolis 500 race, when eventual 1952 Formula One World Drivers' Champion Alberto Ascari competed in the 1952 race, retiring on lap 40 of 200.)	Indianapolis Motor Speedway	Kurtis Kraft	Practice	
Charles de Tornaco (BEL)	September 18, 1953	26	Modena Grand Prix^{†}	Aerautodromo di Modena	Ferrari Tipo 500	Practice	
Onofre Marimón (ARG)	July 31, 1954	30	German Grand Prix	Nürburgring	Maserati 250F	Practice	
Mario Alborghetti (ITA)	April 11, 1955	26	Pau Grand Prix^{†}	Circuit de Pau-Ville	Maserati 4CLT	Race	
Manny Ayulo (USA) (Note: Ayulo died on May 17, 1955, the day after his accident.)	May 16, 1955	33	Indianapolis 500	Indianapolis Motor Speedway	Kurtis Kraft	Practice	
Bill Vukovich (USA)	May 30, 1955	36	Indianapolis 500	Indianapolis Motor Speedway	Kurtis Kraft	Race	
Eugenio Castellotti (ITA)	March 14, 1957	26	Test‡	Aerautodromo di Modena	Ferrari 801	Test	
Keith Andrews (USA)	May 15, 1957	36	Indianapolis 500	Indianapolis Motor Speedway	Kurtis Kraft	Practice	
Pat O'Connor (USA)	May 30, 1958	29	Indianapolis 500	Indianapolis Motor Speedway	Kurtis Kraft	Race	
Luigi Musso (ITA)	July 6, 1958	33	French Grand Prix	Circuit de Reims-Gueux	Ferrari 246 F1	Race	
Peter Collins (UK)	August 3, 1958	26	German Grand Prix	Nürburgring	Ferrari 246 F1	Race	
Stuart Lewis-Evans (UK) (Note: Lewis-Evans died of burns on October 25, 1958, six days after his accident.)	October 19, 1958	28	Moroccan Grand Prix	Circuit d'Ain-Diab	Vanwall	Race	
Jerry Unser Jr. (USA) (Note: Unser Jr. died of burns on May 17, 1959, fifteen days after his accident.)	May 2, 1959	26	Indianapolis 500	Indianapolis Motor Speedway	Kuzma	Practice	
Bob Cortner (USA)	May 19, 1959	32	Indianapolis 500	Indianapolis Motor Speedway	Cornis	Practice	
Harry Schell (USA)	May 13, 1960	38	BRDC International Trophy^{†}	Silverstone Circuit	Cooper T51	Practice	
Chris Bristow (UK)	June 19, 1960	22	Belgian Grand Prix (Note: Bristow and Stacey died in separate accidents.)	Circuit de Spa-Francorchamps	Cooper T51	Race	
Alan Stacey (UK)	June 19, 1960	26	Belgian Grand Prix	Circuit de Spa-Francorchamps	Lotus 18	Race	
Shane Summers (UK)	June 1, 1961	24	Silver City Trophy^{†}	Brands Hatch	Cooper	Practice	
Giulio Cabianca (ITA) (Note: Unable to slow down his car because of technical failure, Cabianca drove through an open gate onto an adjoining public road where he hit several vehicles. Cabianca was killed along with three other people.)	June 15, 1961	38	Test‡	Aerautodromo di Modena	Cooper T51	Test	
Wolfgang von Trips (FRG) (Note: Having collided with Clark, von Trips's car shot up the bank lining the track, hit a wire fence and struck several people gathered behind it while spinning in the air. Von Trips, who was ejected from the car, and fifteen spectators died.)	September 10, 1961	33	Italian Grand Prix	Autodromo Nazionale di Monza	Ferrari 156 F1	Race	
Ricardo Rodríguez (MEX)	November 1, 1962	20	Mexican Grand Prix^{†}	Autódromo Magdalena Mixiuhca	Lotus 24	Practice	
Gary Hocking (FRN)	December 21, 1962	25	Natal Grand Prix^{†}	Westmead Circuit	Lotus 24	Practice	
Carel Godin de Beaufort (NED) (Note: Godin de Beaufort died on August 2, 1964, the day after his accident.)	August 1, 1964	30	German Grand Prix	Nürburgring	Porsche 718	Practice	
John Taylor (UK) (Note: Taylor died of fifty per cent burns on September 8, 1966, just over a month after his accident.)	August 7, 1966	33	German Grand Prix	Nürburgring	Brabham BT11	Race	
Lorenzo Bandini (ITA) (Note: Bandini died on May 10, 1967, three days after his accident.)	May 7, 1967	31	Monaco Grand Prix	Circuit de Monaco	Ferrari 312	Race	
Bob Anderson (UK)	August 14, 1967	36	Test‡	Silverstone Circuit	Brabham BT11	Test	
Jo Schlesser (FRA)	July 7, 1968	40	French Grand Prix	Circuit de Rouen-les-Essarts	Honda RA302	Race	
Gerhard Mitter (FRG)	August 1, 1969^{#}	33	German Grand Prix	Nürburgring	BMW 269	Practice	
Martin Brain (UK)	May 25, 1970	37	Nottingham Sports Car Club meeting^{†}	Silverstone Circuit	Cooper T86B	Race	
Piers Courage (UK)	June 21, 1970	28	Dutch Grand Prix	Circuit Park Zandvoort	De Tomaso 505/38	Race	
Jochen Rindt (AUT)	September 5, 1970	28	Italian Grand Prix	Autodromo Nazionale di Monza	Lotus 72	Qualifying	
Jo Siffert (SUI)	October 24, 1971	35	World Championship Victory Race^{†}	Brands Hatch	BRM P160	Race	
Roger Williamson (UK)	July 29, 1973	25	Dutch Grand Prix	Circuit Park Zandvoort	March 731	Race	
François Cevert (FRA)	October 6, 1973	29	United States Grand Prix	Watkins Glen International	Tyrrell 006	Qualifying	
Peter Revson (USA)	March 22, 1974	35	South African Grand Prix (Note: Crash occurred during an official testing session for the race as cars arrived for the race.)	Kyalami Racing Circuit	Shadow DN3	Test	
Helmut Koinigg (AUT)	October 6, 1974	25	United States Grand Prix	Watkins Glen International	Surtees TS16	Race	
Mark Donohue (USA) (Note: After a tire had blown out, Donohue careened through a number of catch fences and billboards, a support post of which may have struck his helmet. He and Manfred Schaller, a track marshal who had been hit by debris, died on August 19, 1975, two days after the accident.)	August 17, 1975	38	Austrian Grand Prix	Österreichring	March 751	Practice	
Tom Pryce (UK) (Note: Pryce and Frederick Jansen van Vuuren, a teenage volunteer safety marshal, were killed after colliding at high speed when Jansen van Vuuren was crossing the track to put out a fire.)	March 5, 1977	27	South African Grand Prix	Kyalami Racing Circuit	Shadow DN8	Race	
Brian McGuire (AUS) (Note: Experiencing a mechanical failure on his car, McGuire lost control and crashed into a marshals' post. He was killed along with track marshal John Thorpe.)	August 29, 1977	31	Shellsport International Series Round 11^{†}	Brands Hatch	McGuire BM1	Practice	
Ronnie Peterson (SWE) (Note: Peterson died in hospital on September 11, 1978, the day after his accident, as a result of fat embolism.)	September 10, 1978	34	Italian Grand Prix	Autodromo Nazionale di Monza	Lotus 78	Race	
Patrick Depailler (FRA)	August 1, 1980	35	Test‡	Hockenheimring	Alfa Romeo 179	Test	
Gilles Villeneuve (CAN)	May 8, 1982	32	Belgian Grand Prix	Circuit Zolder	Ferrari 126C2	Qualifying	
Riccardo Paletti (ITA)	June 13, 1982	23	Canadian Grand Prix	Circuit Gilles Villeneuve	Osella FA1C	Race	
Elio de Angelis (ITA) (Note: De Angelis died on May 15, 1986, the day after his accident.)	May 14, 1986	28	Test‡	Circuit Paul Ricard	Brabham BT55	Test	
Roland Ratzenberger (AUT)	April 30, 1994	33	San Marino Grand Prix	Autodromo Enzo e Dino Ferrari	Simtek S941	Qualifying	
Ayrton Senna (BRA) (Note: Death of Ayrton Senna)	May 1, 1994	34	San Marino Grand Prix	Autodromo Enzo e Dino Ferrari	Williams FW16	Race	
John Dawson-Damer (UK) (Note: Dawson-Damer crashed into a wooden gantry at the finish line, also killing Andrew Carpenter, a marshal, and seriously wounding another. The 59-year-old driver may have suffered a fatal heart attack before losing control of his car.)	June 24, 2000	59	Goodwood Festival of Speed^{†}	Goodwood Hillclimb	Lotus 63	Run	
Fritz Glatz (AUT)	July 14, 2002	58	Czech Superprix^{†}	Autodrom Most	Footwork FA17	Race	
Denis Welch (UK)	July 27, 2014	69	Jack Brabham Memorial Trophy^{†}	Silverstone Circuit	Lotus 18	Race	
Jules Bianchi (FRA) (Note: Bianchi remained comatose in hospital until he succumbed to his injuries on July 17, 2015, more than nine months after his accident.)	October 5, 2014	25	Japanese Grand Prix	Suzuka International Racing Course	Marussia MR03	Race	
David Ferrer (FRA) (Note: Ferrer died on September 7, 2017, five days after his accident.)	September 2, 2017	62	Historic Grand Prix^{†}	Circuit Park Zandvoort	March 701	Race	

=== By type of event ===
Fatalities by type of event
Event	Fatalities	First	Last
World Championship (Note: Fatalities during practice, qualifying, or race at a Formula One World Championship event.)	33	1953	2014
Testing	6	1952	1986
Non-Championship & other (Note: Fatalities during non-championship Formula One events organized as part of the official Formula One racing season (once common, such as the 14 non-championship races in 1963, these were discontinued after the single 1983 non-championship race), and other unassociated competitions using vintage Formula One cars.)	13	1955	2017
Total	52	1952	2017

=== By nationality ===
Fatalities by Nationality
Nationality	Total	First	Last
United Kingdom	14	1952	2014
United States	10	1953	1975
Italy	7	1955	1986
France	5	1968	2017
Austria	4	1970	2002
Germany	2	1961	1969
Argentina	1	1954	
Australia	1	1977	
Belgium	1	1953	
Brazil	1	1994	
Canada	1	1982	
Mexico	1	1962	
Netherlands	1	1964	
Rhodesia and Nyasaland	1	1962	
Sweden	1	1978	
Switzerland	1	1971	
Total for 16 nationalities	52	1952	2017

=== By circuit ===
Fatalities by Circuit
Circuit	Total	First	Last
(United States) Indianapolis Motor Speedway	7	1953	1959
(Germany) Nürburgring	5	1954	1969
(United Kingdom) Silverstone Circuit	4	1960	2014
(Italy) Aerautodromo di Modena	3	1953	1961
(United Kingdom) Brands Hatch	3	1961	1977
(Italy) Autodromo Nazionale di Monza	3	1961	1978
(Netherlands) Circuit Park Zandvoort	3	1970	2017
(Belgium) Circuit de Spa-Francorchamps	2	1960	
(United States) Watkins Glen International	2	1973	1974
(South Africa) Kyalami Racing Circuit	2	1974	1977
(Italy) Autodromo Enzo e Dino Ferrari	2	1994	
(United Kingdom) MIRA	1	1952	
(France) Circuit de Pau-Ville	1	1955	
(France) Circuit de Reims-Gueux	1	1958	
(Morocco) Circuit d'Ain-Diab	1	1958	
(Mexico) Autódromo Magdalena Mixiuhca	1	1962	
(South Africa) Westmead Circuit	1	1962	
Circuit de Monaco	1	1967	
(France) Circuit de Rouen-les-Essarts	1	1968	
(Austria) Österreichring	1	1975	
(Germany) Hockenheimring	1	1980	
(Belgium) Circuit Zolder	1	1982	
(Canada) Circuit Gilles Villeneuve	1	1982	
(France) Circuit Paul Ricard	1	1986	
(United Kingdom) Goodwood Hillclimb	1	2000	
(Czech Republic) Autodrom Most	1	2002	
(Japan) Suzuka International Racing Course	1	2014	
Total for 27 circuits	52	1952	2017

=== By decade ===
Fatalities by Decade
Decade	Total	First	Last
1950s	15	1952	1959
1960s	14	1960	1969
1970s	12	1970	1978
1980s	4	1980	1986
1990s	2	1994	1994
2000s	2	2000	2002
2010s	3	2014	2017
2020s	0	-	
Total	52	1952	2017
