= John Dawson-Damer =

British historic racing driver and Lotus collector

The Honourable John Dawson-Damer
- Born: Lionel John Charles Seymour Dawson-Damer; October 12, 1940; Windsor, Berkshire, England
- Died: June 24, 2000 (aged 59); Goodwood Circuit, Chichester, England
- Cause of death: Cardiac arrest leading to fatal crash
- Education: Eton College
- Occupations: Racing driver; Motorsport official; Engineer
- Known for: Dawson-Damer Lotus Collection; Chairman of the CAMS Historic Commission; 1978 Australian Rally Champion (navigator)
- Spouses: Rosemary Ashley Morritt Hancock (m. 1965; div. 1975); Ashley Judith Manu (m. 1982)
- Children: 2 (stepchildren)
- Parents: George Dawson-Damer, Viscount Carlow; Peggy Dawson-Damer, Viscountess Carlow
- Relatives: George Dawson-Damer, 7th Earl of Portarlington (brother); George Dawson-Damer, 5th Earl of Portarlington (great-grandfather)

Lionel John Charles Seymour Dawson-Damer (12 October 1940 – 24 June 2000), colloquially "D-D", was a British-born Australian racing driver, administrator and collector of historic Lotus racing cars. He won the 1978 Australian Rally Championship as a co-driver.

Dawson-Damer also served as the chairman of the Historic Commission of the Confederation of Australian Motor Sport and represented Australia on the FIA Historic Car Commission. He died in a crash while driving a Lotus 63 in a hillclimb at the Goodwood Festival of Speed on 24 June 2000.

== Early life ==
John Dawson-Damer was born on 12 October 1940 in Windsor, Berkshire. He was the younger son of Air Commodore George Lionel Seymour Dawson-Damer, Viscount Carlow, and his wife Peggy Cambie, and the great-grandson of George Dawson-Damer, 5th Earl of Portarlington. His father was killed in an air accident in 1944 while on active service with the RAF during World War II.

Dawson-Damer was educated at Eton College. He visited Colin Chapman's factory at Hornsey in 1958. Dawson-Damer later attended Grenoble University in France to study the language before returning to England to complete a mechanical apprenticeship. In 1964 he emigrated to Perth, Australia, to join Austral Engineering Supplies, which was a branch of the family business. He later moved to Sydney and became a permanent resident.

== Racing career ==
After moving to Sydney Dawson-Damer began competing in Australian rally. His greatest motorsport achievement came in 1978, when he won the 1978 Australian Rally Championship for navigators alongside Colin Bond.

The pair competed together in events such as the Repco Round Australia Trial in 1979 and the Southern Cross Rally. He was also often in the crew for the course-opening safety car at Rally Australia.

Dawson-Damer's involvement in historic racing began in the 1970s after he purchased a Lotus 16 and began driving it in vintage events. Over the next 15 years he became a prolific competitor at major historic meetings across Australia and Europe, often driving Lotus racing cars from his private collection. His last appearance was in 2000, where he drove an ex-Graham Hill Lotus 49 in a support race for the Adelaide 500.

=== Administration ===
Dawson-Damer served as Chairman of the Historic Commission of the Confederation of Australian Motor Sport (now Motorsport Australia) and was Australia’s representative on the FIA Historic Car Commission. He also owned the circuit Oran Park.

== Death ==
On 24 June 2000, Dawson-Damer was at the Goodwood Festival of Speed. He was driving in a hill climb in a Lotus 63, when near the end of the course, the car veered off the track at high speed and struck the finish line gantry. The impact killed Dawson-Damer instantly and also took the life of race marshal Andrew Carpenter. A second marshal was also seriously injured, losing a leg.

An inquiry held in 2003 heard medical evidence suggesting that Dawson-Damer had suffered a cardiac arrest just moments before the crash, which would explain the lack of any kind of braking or steering input as the car approached the finish line. The inquiry also found that the fishing line gantry was unsafe and had not been approved by safety officials. The death was ruled as accidental by jurors.

== Personal life ==
In 1965, Dawson-Damer married Rosemary Ashley Morritt Hancock; they divorced in 1975. In 1982 he married Ashley Judith Manu, an arts patron and former model. He was the stepfather to Ashley's two adopted children from her previous marriage.

Dawson-Damer owned a private collection of Lotus racing cars, all of which he had purchased. At his home in Sydney he maintained a collection of eight Lotus Formula One cars, which included Jim Clark's 1963 World Championship-winning Lotus 25, Graham Hill's Lotus 49 and Jochen Rindt's Lotus 63.

== See also ==
- List of Formula One fatalities
- 1978 Australian Rally Championship
- Goodwood Festival of Speed
