= Formula One drivers from the United States =

List of Formula One drivers who competed as Americans

- Drivers: 58 (Note: Does not include 175 drivers who only raced at the Indianapolis 500. Including these drivers would make 233 drivers.)
- Grands Prix: 503 (Note: Includes 11 editions of the Indianapolis 500. Excluding the Indianapolis 500 would make 492 Grands Prix.)
- Entries: 904 (Note: Does not include entries at the Indianapolis 500.)
- Starts: 830 (Note: Does not include 363 starts at the Indianapolis 500. Including these starts would make 1193 starts.)
- Best season finish: 1st (1961, 1978)
- Wins: 33 (Note: Includes 11 wins at the Indianapolis 500. Excluding the Indianapolis 500 would make 22 wins.)
- Podiums: 129 (Note: Includes 37 podiums at the Indianapolis 500. Excluding the Indianapolis 500 would make 92 podiums.)
- Fastest laps: 39 (Note: Includes 11 fastest laps at the Indianapolis 500. Excluding the Indianapolis 500 would make 25 fastest laps.)
- Points: 999 (Note: Includes 264 points at the Indianapolis 500. Excluding the Indianapolis 500 would make 735 points.)
- First entry: 1950 Monaco Grand Prix
- First win: 1950 Indianapolis 500 (Note: The first win outside the Indianapolis 500 was the 1960 Italian Grand Prix)
- Latest win: 1978 Dutch Grand Prix
- Latest entry: 2024 Dutch Grand Prix
- 2026 drivers: None

There have been 58 Formula One drivers from the United States including two World Drivers' Championship winners, Mario Andretti and Phil Hill. Andretti is the most successful American Formula One driver, with one title and 12 race wins. Eddie Cheever has started the most Grands Prix, with 132; Andretti has 128, and no other driver has more than 86 starts.

As of 2026, Andretti is the last American to win a Formula One race, taking the 1978 Dutch Grand Prix in his title season. Logan Sargeant is the most recent American driver, having competed in 2023 and 2024.

== Statistics ==
=== Indianapolis 500 era (1950–1960) ===
From 1950 to 1960, the Indianapolis 500 counted towards the FIA World Championship of Drivers (now known as the Formula One World Championship). However, the oval track at Indianapolis Motor Speedway (IMS) differed significantly from the road courses prevalent in Formula One, and the Indianapolis 500 was not subject to the FIA's racing formula (that is, "Formula One"), potentially forcing teams to design a special car for one race per year. In addition, the race did not count towards the International Cup for Formula One Manufacturers. Coupled with the expense and hassle of traveling to Indianapolis, very few teams and drivers from Europe participated in the event.

In 1959, Formula One began organizing a standalone United States Grand Prix on an American road course, which was generally East Coast track Watkins Glen until the 1980s. The USGP was often scheduled as the season finale, and supplanted Indianapolis as America's world championship race. Formula One did not return to Indianapolis until 2000, after IMS built a road course in its infield.

Because of the presence of the Indianapolis 500 on the World Championship calendar, statistics for United States Formula One drivers are not representative of America's true participation in the competition. While 233 drivers from the United States have started a World Championship race, 175 of these drivers only ever raced at Indianapolis. Excluding those drivers, 58 American drivers have taken part in Formula One.

=== General statistics ===
Two drivers have won the World Drivers' Championship under an American license, with Phil Hill winning in 1961 and Mario Andretti winning in 1978. Andretti was the last American driver to win a Formula One race – the 1978 Dutch Grand Prix.

Including Indianapolis-only drivers, 233 American drivers have started a World Championship race; 15 drivers have won at least one race; 5 drivers have won multiple races (Andretti, Gurney, Hill, Revson, and Vukovich); and 20 drivers have started 10 or more races. However, of the 20 Americans to start 10 or more races, three competed in only U.S.-based races, and another three competed in just one season.

Excluding Indianapolis-only drivers, 58 American drivers have started a Formula One race, most recently Williams Racing's Logan Sargeant (2023–24). Americans have won 22 races (12 by Mario Andretti). Five Americans (Cheever, Andretti, Gurney, Schell, and Ward) have competed in 10 or more World Championship seasons, although Ward never competed outside the United States and just three of his 12 starts were non-Indianapolis 500.

From 1993 to 2023, only four Americans competed in a Formula One race (Michael Andretti, Scott Speed, Alexander Rossi, and Sargeant), and only Andretti and Sargeant scored points. America's relative lack of participation has been attributed to the fact that Formula One's FIA Super License system generally requires aspiring drivers to enter the European-centered junior racing pyramid as teenagers. The high cost of racing in the European junior pyramid has also been cited as a factor. Scott Speed noted that America has other motorsport competitions with cheaper junior pyramids, like NASCAR, although "if you really wanted to make it to Formula 1, you're going to find a way".

== List of drivers with 10 or more starts ==
Name	Teams participating in non-U.S. races	First race	Last race	Seasons	Entries	Starts	Wins	Poles	Best finish	Source
Eddie Cheever	Theodore, Hesketh, Osella, Tyrrell, Talbot, Renault, Alfa Romeo, Haas Lola, Arrows	1978 Argentina	1989 Australia	11	143	132	0	0	7 (1983)	
Mario Andretti	Lotus, STP, Ferrari, Parnelli, Alfa Romeo, Williams	1968 Italy	1982 Caesars Palace	14	140 (Note: Also participated as a substitute driver in one race in 1984.)	128	12	18	1 (1978)	
Dan Gurney	Ferrari, BRM (Owen), Porsche, Seidel, Brabham (inc. MRD), Anglo American, McLaren	1959 France	1970 Britain	12	91	86	4	3	4 (1961, 1965)	
Harry Schell	Horschell, Bleue, Platé, Gordini, Privé, Maserati, Ferrari, Vanwall, Centro Sud, Bonnier, BRM (Owen)	1950 Monaco	1960 Argentina	11	56	56	0	0	6 (1958)	
Richie Ginther	Ferrari, Scarab (Reventlow), BRM (Owen), Honda, Cooper, Anglo American (inc. Advance Muffler)	1960 Monaco	1967 Netherlands	7	58	52	1	0	3 (1963)	
Phil Hill	Bonnier, Ferrari, BRP (Yeoman), Porsche, ATS, Filipinetti, Cooper, Anglo American	1958 France	1966 Italy	8	55	47	3	6	1 (1961)	
Masten Gregory	Centro Sud, BRM (Owen), Buell, Cooper, Camoradi, BRP (Laystall), Parnell	1957 Monaco	1965 Italy	8	47	38	0	0	6 (1957)	
Logan Sargeant	Williams	2023 Bahrain	2024 Netherlands	2	37 (Note: Also participated as a third, substitute driver in four races in 2022.)	36	0	0	21 (2023)	
Brett Lunger	Hesketh, Surtees, BS Fabrications (Chesterfield, Liggett), Ensign	1975 Austria	1978 United States	4	43	34	0	0	N/A	
Peter Revson	BRM, Lotus, Tyrrell, McLaren, Shadow	1964 Monaco	1974 South Africa	5	33	30	2	1	5 (1972, 1973)	
Scott Speed	Toro Rosso	2006 Bahrain	2007 Europe	2	28 (Note: Also participated as a third, substitute driver in two races in 2005.)	28	0	0	20 (2006, 2007)	
Danny Sullivan	Tyrrell	1983 Brazil	1983 South Africa	1	15	15	0	0	17 (1983)	
Mark Donohue	Penske	1971 Canada	1975 Austria	3	16	14	0	0	15 (1975)	
Michael Andretti	McLaren	1993 South Africa	1993 Italy	1	13	13	0	0	11 (1993)	
George Follmer	Shadow	1973 Brazil	1973 United States	1	14	12	0	0	13 (1973)	
Rodger Ward	U.S. races only	1951 Indianapolis	1963 United States	11	12	12	1	0	10 (1959)	
Ronnie Bucknum	Honda	1964 Belgium	1966 Mexico	3	14	11	0	0	15 (1965)	
Jim Hall	BRP	1960 United States	1963 Mexico	3	13	11	0	0	13 (1963)	
Tony Bettenhausen	U.S. races only	1950 Indianapolis	1960 Indianapolis	11	11	11	0	0	13 (1955)	
Jim Rathmann	U.S. races only	1950 Indianapolis	1960 Indianapolis	10	10	10	1	0	8 (1960)	

== Notable former drivers ==
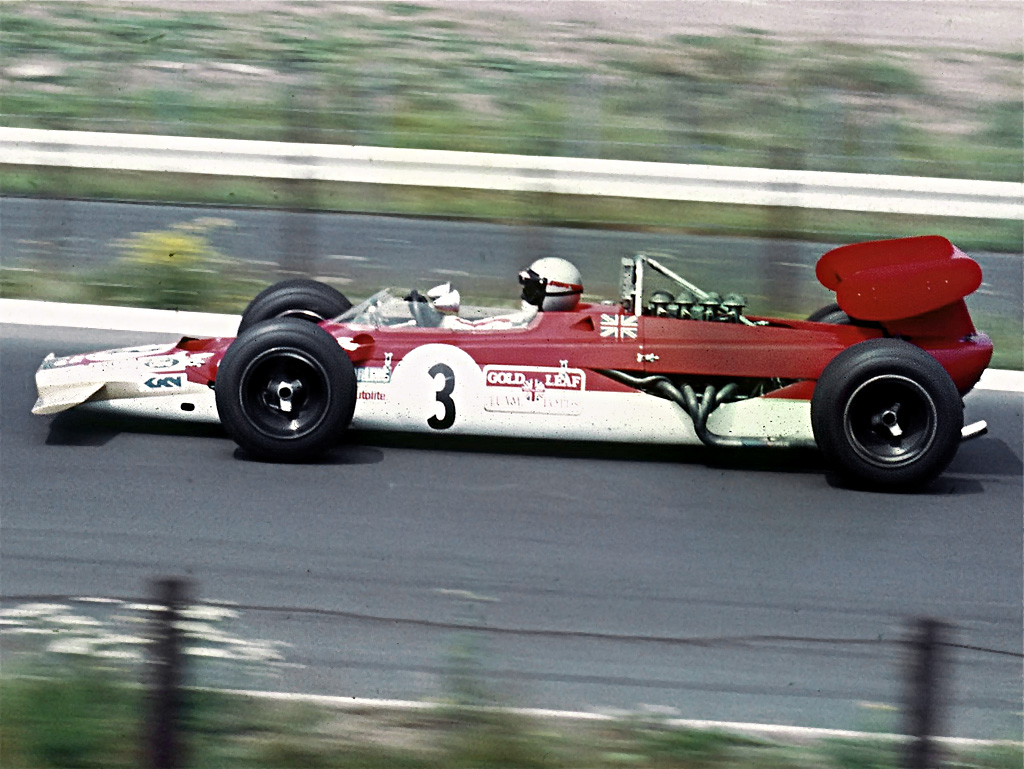
Mario Andretti in the Lotus 63 at the 1969 German Grand Prix

Mario Andretti immigrated to the United States from Italy at the age of 15, became a U.S. citizen in 1965, and became America's most successful Formula One driver. Andretti debuted with Team Lotus at the 1968 Italian Grand Prix, but focused on his IndyCar career, which paid better at the time. He started only 21 of 84 races from 1968 to 1974, driving for four teams (Lotus, Ferrari, and his two IndyCar teams, one of which ran a privateer F1 chassis). He won his first race in his Ferrari debut, the 1971 South African Grand Prix. However, he did not achieve sustained success in Formula One until rejoining Lotus in 1976. After helping develop the groundbreaking ground-effect Lotus 78, he won four races in 1977 but lost the drivers' title to poor reliability. In 1978, he piloted the Lotus 78 and Lotus 79 to six wins and the title. Lotus' performance declined precipitiously the following year, and Andretti never won another Formula One race. He retired from full-time Formula One racing in 1981 and competed in his final race in 1982. In 128 race starts, Andretti won 12 races and collected 19 podiums. Andretti will return to Formula One in 2026 as a director for the incoming Cadillac team.

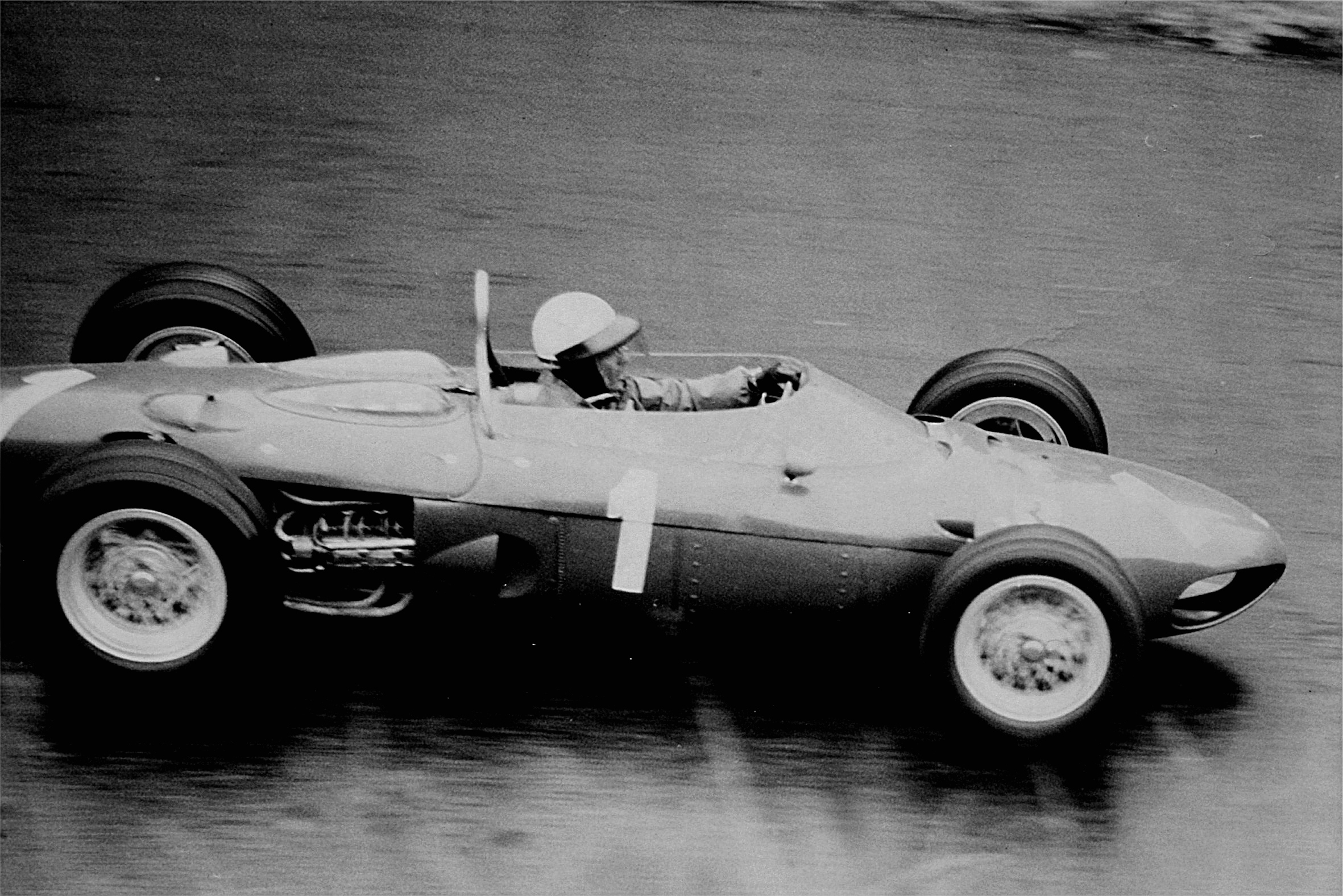
Drivers' champion Phil Hill in the Ferrari 156 F1 in 1962

Phil Hill is the only American-born Formula One champion. He won with Ferrari in 1961 after having had a season-long battle for top spot with teammate Wolfgang von Trips. Hill's win at the 1961 Italian Grand Prix secured the drivers' title for the American but, after passing the checkered flag and returning to the pits, he discovered that his close rival had died in an accident during the race. The collision between von Trips and Jim Clark's Lotus also killed 15 spectators – Hill's victory coincided with the worst tragedy in Formula One history. During his Formula One career Hill started 48 races and won just three events, the joint lowest of any world champion alongside Briton Mike Hawthorn.

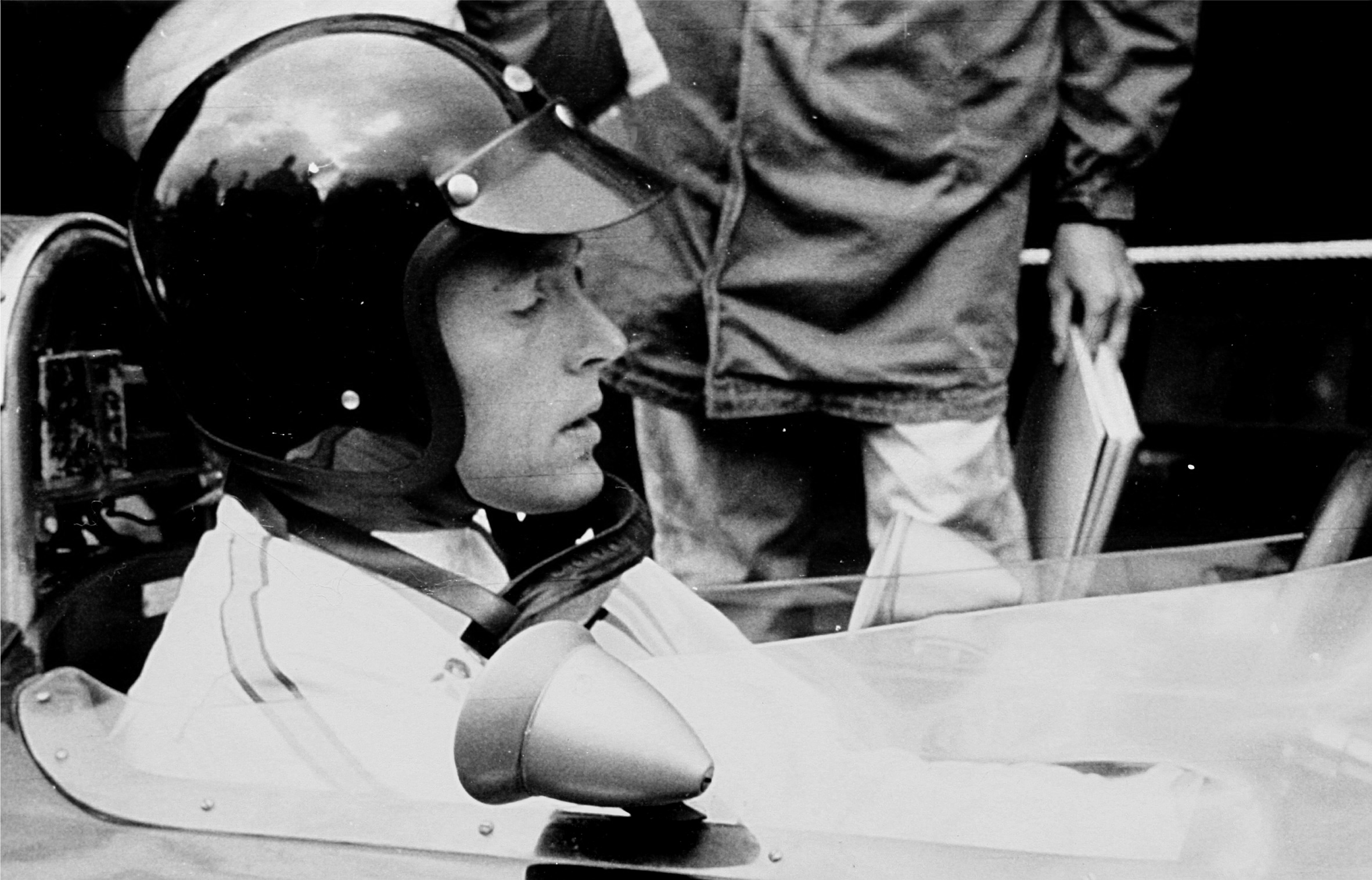
Dan Gurney in 1965

Dan Gurney is highly regarded for his Formula One contributions both on and off track. He is the only driver to have scored the first victory for three constructors: Porsche (1962), Brabham (1964), and Eagle (1967). He himself had built the Eagle. Gurney's name is still associated with aerodynamics; he was the first person to use what is now known as a "Gurney flap" on the wing of his car. He is also credited as the first person to spray champagne on the podium. Gurney had made his debut with Ferrari in 1959, finishing in the top three in two of the four races he contested. His second season, now with BRM, was much less successful and his only race finish was in tenth position. Between 1961 and 1965 Gurney drove for three teams and was classified in the top six in the drivers' championship on each occasion, but he would never get higher than fourth in the title race. He left the sport in 1968 but made a brief return with McLaren after the death of founder Bruce McLaren. Gurney won four races out of the 86 he started.

Peter Revson started four races as a privateer in 1964, but returned to the US to drive in sports cars and Indy Cars. He made a guest appearance for Tyrrell at the 1971 United States Grand Prix and, though he did not finish the race, he impressed enough to be signed for McLaren for the following season. He stood on the podium at four of the nine races he attended, and stayed with the team for an even more successful year in 1973. Revson won the 1973 British Grand Prix and the 1973 Canadian Grand Prix, both in wet conditions, but chose to move to Shadow when McLaren offered him only a third car. While testing for the 1974 South African Grand Prix the front suspension of Revson's car failed, sending him into the barriers with fatal results.

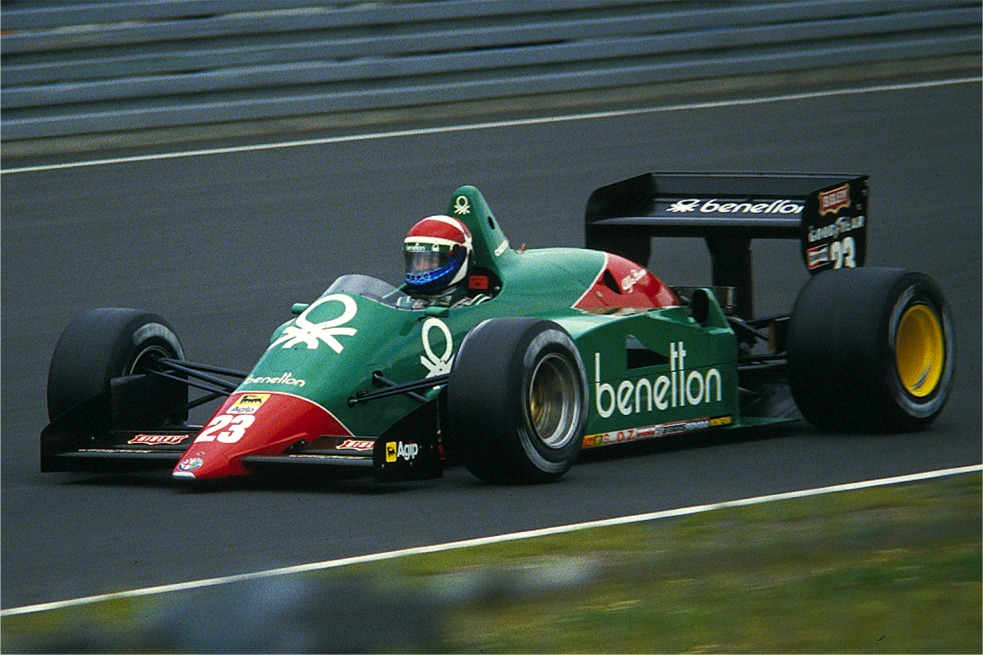
Eddie Cheever in the Alfa Romeo 184 T in 1985

Eddie Cheever had a brief spell in Formula One in 1978 before starting full-time drives in 1980 with Osella. The new team were unable to provide him with a decent car and he only finished in one of the races that year. He moved to Tyrrell for 1981 and things improved but he still missed out on podium finishes. With Ligier in 1982 he finished in the top three at three races before another change of team beckoned. Cheever enjoyed his most successful season with Renault in 1983, finishing on the podium four times. He was still unable to taste victory and, though his career would go on to the end of 1989, he was only ever able to finish at best third in two races. Cheever started more races than any other American driver. Throughout the 132 races he was never able to achieve a win, a pole position, or a fastest lap.

Richie Ginther started 52 races in the 1960s, finishing on the podium 14 times. He won the 1965 Mexican Grand Prix with Honda and came third overall in the 1963 season with BRM.

Bill Vukovich competed in five Indy 500 races when they were part of the Formula One World Championship. In 1951 he was forced to retire after just 29 laps and could only finish 17th the following year. He came back for the 1953 event, took pole position and then won the race. He won again in 1954 and was leading in 1955 when he crashed into a back marker. The collision pitched the car into and over a concrete wall, fracturing Vukovich's skull and killing him at the scene. Statistically Vukovich won 40% of the Formula One races in which he competed, but drivers who competed only at the Indy 500 events are often omitted from the history of the sport.

== See also ==
- List of Formula One Grand Prix winners
