= 2014 Japanese Grand Prix =

Formula One motor race

Race 15 of 19 in the 2014 Formula One World Championship
← Previous race	Next race →
- Suzuka Circuit

Race details
- Date: 5 October 2014
- Official name: 2014 Formula 1 Japanese Grand Prix
- Location: Suzuka Circuit; Suzuka, Mie, Japan
- Course: Permanent racing facility
- Course length: 5.807 km (3.608 miles)
- Distance: 44 laps, 255.208 (Note: There is a 0.300 km (0.186 mi) offset between the start and finish lines.) km (158.579 miles)
- Scheduled distance: 53 laps, 307.471 km (191.054 miles)
- Weather: Rain. Air: 20 °C (68 °F) Track: 24 °C (75 °F)
- Attendance: 150,000

Pole position
Driver	(Germany) Nico Rosberg	Mercedes
- Time: 1:32.506

Fastest lap
Driver	(United Kingdom) Lewis Hamilton	Mercedes
- Time: 1:51.600 on lap 39

Podium
First	(United Kingdom) Lewis Hamilton	Mercedes
Second	(Germany) Nico Rosberg	Mercedes
Third	(Germany) Sebastian Vettel	Red Bull Racing-Renault

The 2014 Japanese Grand Prix (formally the 2014 Formula 1 Japanese Grand Prix) was a Formula One motor race held on 5 October 2014 at the Suzuka Circuit in Suzuka, Mie. It was the 15th race of the 2014 Formula One World Championship, and the 30th Formula One Japanese Grand Prix. Mercedes driver Lewis Hamilton won the 44-lap race starting from second position. His teammate, Nico Rosberg, finished second and Red Bull Racing driver Sebastian Vettel was third. It was Hamilton's eighth victory of the season and the 30th of his Formula One career.

Going into the race, Hamilton led Rosberg by three championship points in the World Drivers' Championship and their team led the World Constructors' Championship by 174 championship points over Red Bull. Heavy rain from Typhoon Phanfone made the track surface wet and reduced visibility. Starting from behind the safety car, the race was stopped after two laps and resumed 20 minutes later. Rosberg immediately blocked a pass by Hamilton heading into the first corner. His car then experienced oversteer, and Hamilton reduced the time deficit between them. Hamilton challenged Rosberg for the lead over the next four laps, before overtaking him on the 29th lap and pulling away.

The race was scheduled to run for 53 laps, but was brought to an end on the 46th lap (with the result taken at the end of lap 44) after an accident involving Jules Bianchi. Bianchi lost control of his Marussia at the Dunlop Curve on the 43rd lap and collided with a tractor crane that was tending to Adrian Sutil's Sauber, which had spun off on the previous lap. Bianchi sustained severe head injuries in the accident, from which he died in France on 17 July 2015, thus becoming the first driver to die as a result of injuries sustained in a Formula One race since Ayrton Senna in 1994. The accident prompted Formula One's governing body, the Fédération Internationale de l'Automobile (FIA), to investigate the incident with a ten-person panel in which it was determined there was no single cause that prompted the crash. The investigation led to the virtual safety car (VSC) being introduced from the 2015 season onwards.

The victory allowed Hamilton to increase his lead in the World Drivers' Championship to ten championship points over Rosberg, with Daniel Ricciardo a distant third. Mercedes extended their advantage over Red Bull in the World Constructors' Championship, and Williams remained ahead of Ferrari in the battle for third place with four races left in the season.

== Background ==
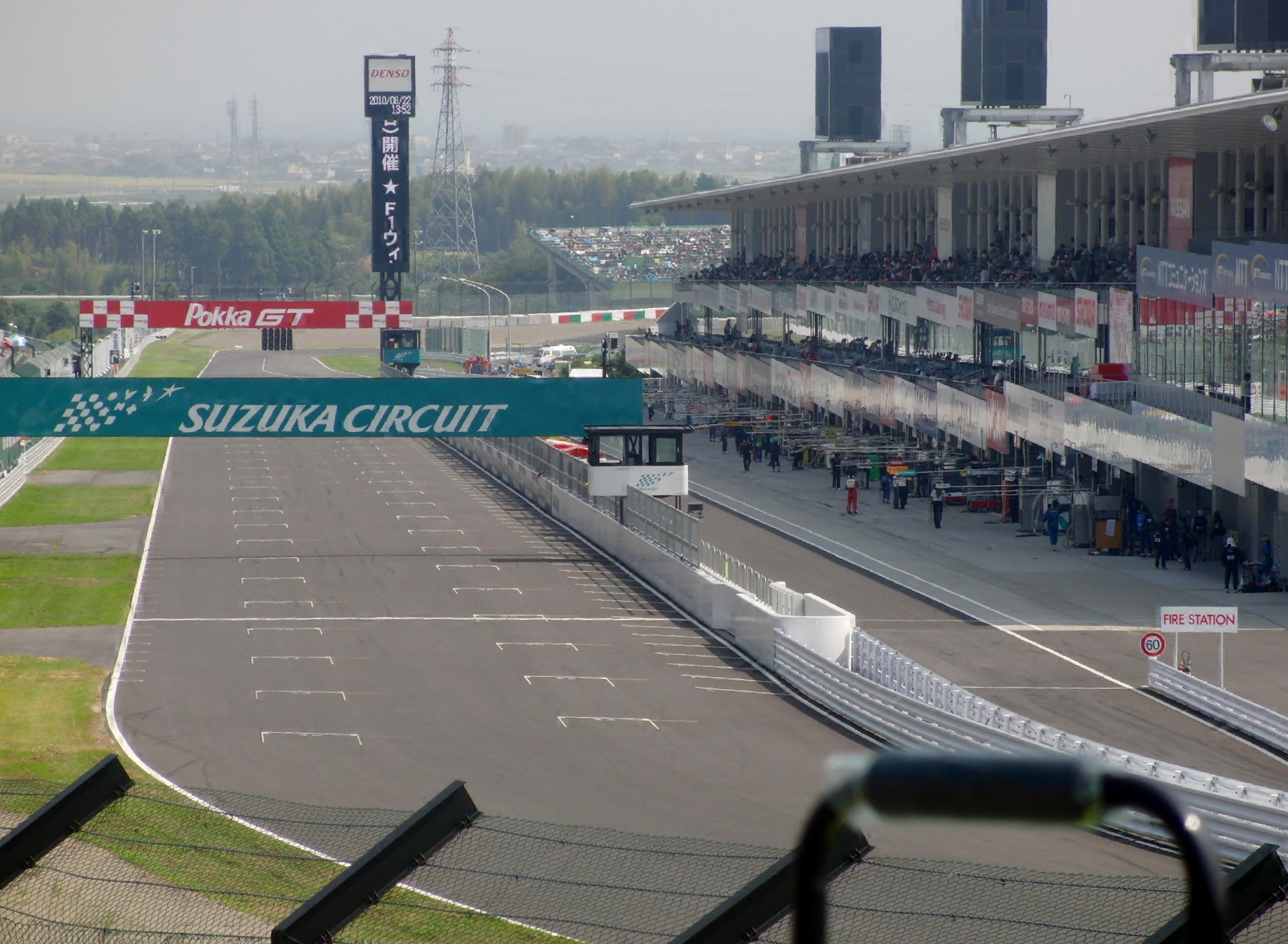
The start/finish straight of Suzuka Circuit

The 2014 Japanese Grand Prix was the 15th of the 19 races of the 2014 Formula One World Championship, and the 30th running of the event as part of the Formula One World Championship. It was held on 5 October at the 5.807 km (3.608 mi) 18-turn Suzuka Circuit in Suzuka, Mie. The event's official name was the 2014 Formula 1 Japanese Grand Prix, and it was scheduled to last 53 laps over a distance of 307.471 km (191.054 mi).

Tyre supplier Pirelli brought four types of tyre to the race: two dry compounds (the white-banded medium "options" and the orange-banded hard "primes") and two wet-weather compounds (intermediate and full wet). The drag reduction system (DRS) had one activation zone for the race, on the straight linking the final and first corners. The circuit underwent changes following the previous year's race; parts of the track between the 14th and 15th turns were resurfaced, TecPro barriers were installed on the inside after the exit of turn 15 and lamp posts near debris fences outside turns 13 and 14 were moved back.

Going into the race, Mercedes driver Lewis Hamilton led the Drivers' Championship with 241 championship points, three ahead of teammate Nico Rosberg, with Red Bull driver Daniel Ricciardo third with 181. Ferrari driver Fernando Alonso was fourth with 133, followed by Ricciardo's teammate Sebastian Vettel with 124. Mercedes led the Constructors' Championship with 479 championship points, having won 11 of the previous 14 races of the season, while Red Bull were second with 305 championship points, having won the other three races; they were followed by Williams (187), Ferrari (178) and Force India (117). Mercedes had to outscore Red Bull by 41 championship points to clinch the Constructors' title in Japan.

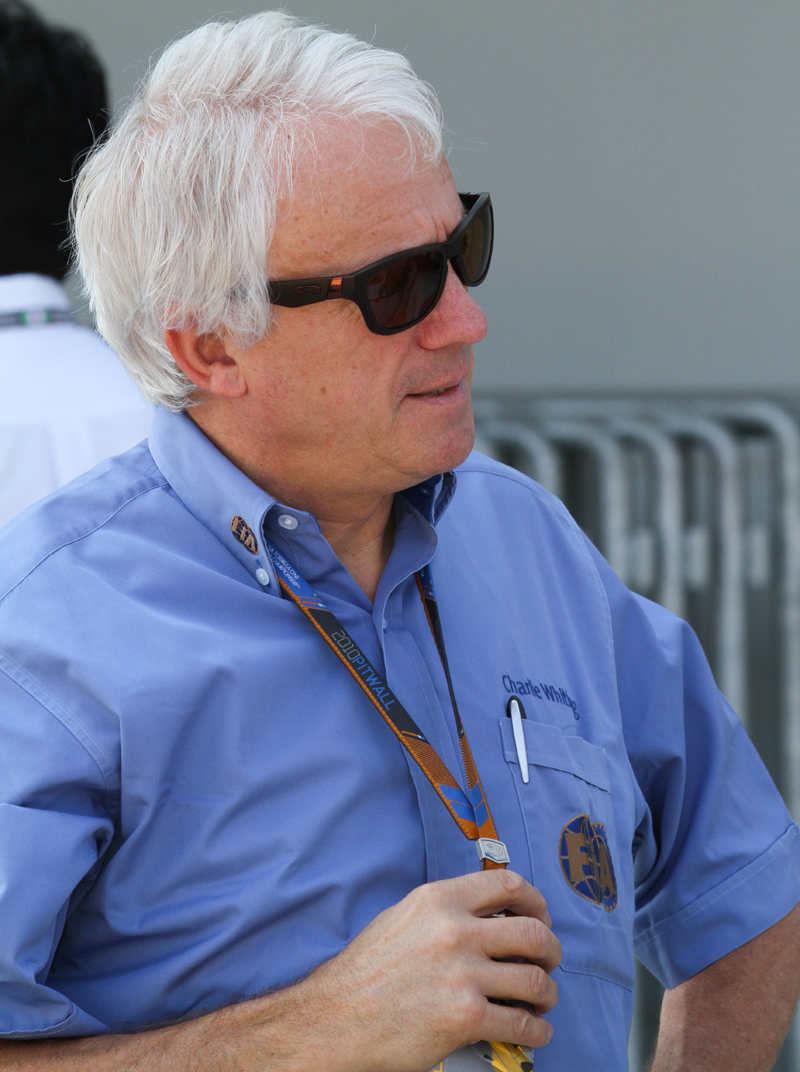
Charlie Whiting (pictured in 2010) suggested to race organisers that the start time be moved to avoid heavy rain from Typhoon Phanfone.

Despite reclaiming the Drivers' Championship lead at the preceding Singapore Grand Prix, Hamilton said that he was not relieved because of the closeness of the race. He said that he would take Rosberg's race-by-race approach and was happy to be performing well. Hamilton, who had yet to win the Japanese Grand Prix at Suzuka, aimed for a victory at the circuit. Red Bull team principal Christian Horner said that the championship was out of their reach, although he hoped further reliability problems with the Mercedes cars would prolong the battle. Horner ruled out team orders favouring one driver over the other. Rosberg said he was looking forward to the race, and his car's speed gave him hope for a good result.

Typhoon Phanfone, classified as a category-four tropical storm, was forecast to make landfall over the eastern Japanese coast on race day with heavy rain and winds of up to 240 km/h (150 mph). Although the storm was predicted to miss Suzuka, heavy rain from its northern edge was expected to drench the circuit. The Russian Grand Prix, scheduled for the following week, made it impossible for the Japanese Grand Prix to be postponed until Monday due to freight schedules to Russia for the teams' equipment. Bernie Ecclestone, owner of Formula One's commercial rights, raised the possibility of moving up the start time, but later said that the event would proceed as planned. The Fédération Internationale de l'Automobile (FIA) race director, Charlie Whiting, suggested to race organisers that the start time be moved and warned them that the race would not take place unless it was declared safe, but they refused. Honda, the owners of the track, reportedly rejected the start time change to allow spectators to arrive at Suzuka in time for the start. Whiting was also overruled by senior FIA officials, who opposed the disruption of the event's worldwide television coverage.

There were 11 teams (each representing a different constructor) entering two race drivers for the event and two free practice session participants. Red Bull selected Formula Three driver Max Verstappen to replace Jean-Éric Vergne to test him as part of his preparation for a full-time seat at Toro Rosso in the 2015 season. Aged 17 years and three days, Verstappen was the youngest person in history to participate in a Formula One race weekend. Caterham confirmed that Roberto Merhi would replace Marcus Ericsson, and Kamui Kobayashi would drive in the race. Formula Renault 3.5 Series driver Will Stevens was announced as participating in the first practice session in Max Chilton's car, but a problem with paperwork sent to the FIA Contract Recognition Board due to an industrial action in Germany prevented him from driving.

== Practice ==
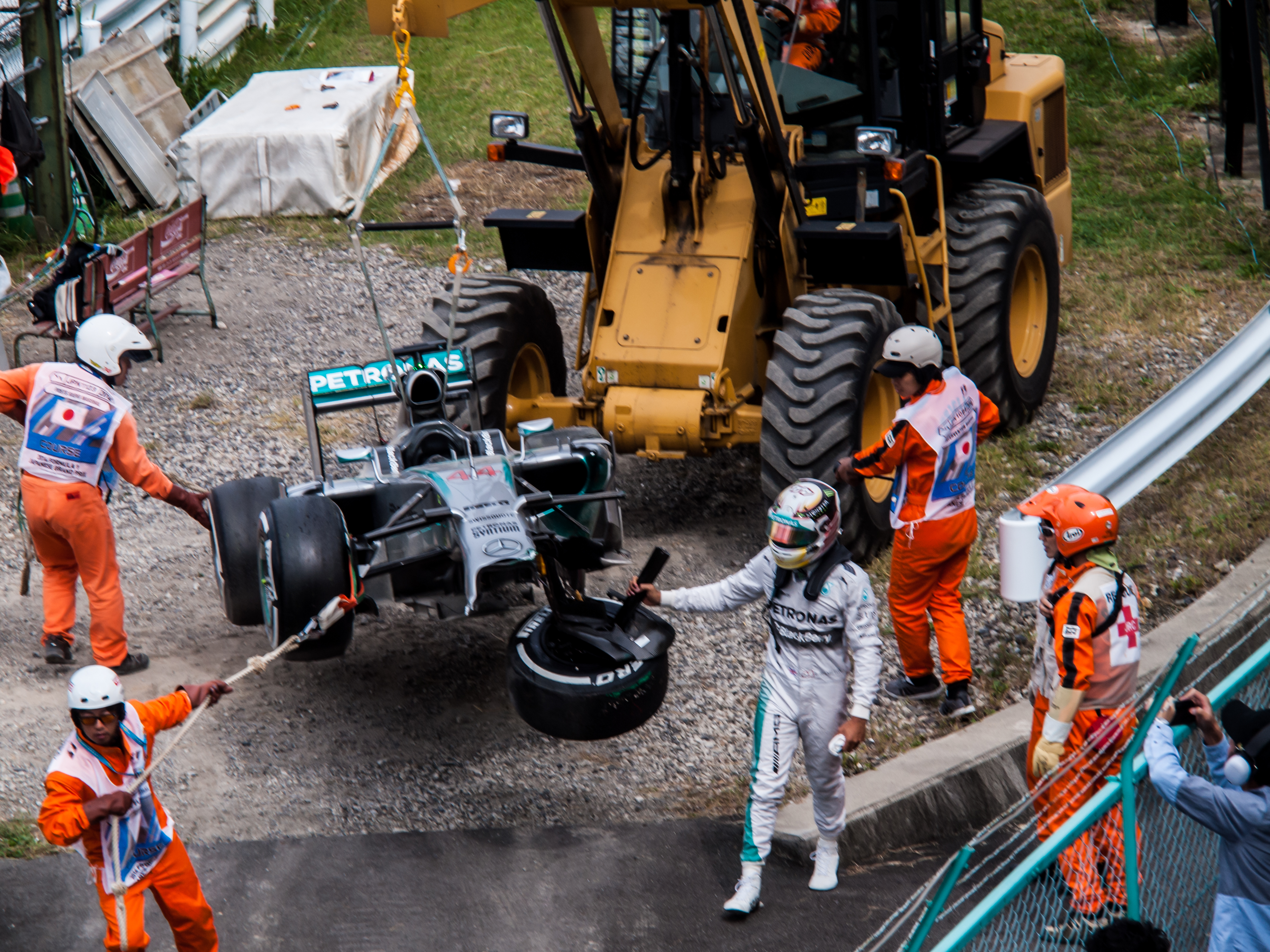
Lewis Hamilton after damaging his car in an accident during the third practice session

There were three practice sessions – two on Friday and a third on Saturday – preceding Sunday's race. The Friday morning and afternoon sessions lasted 90 minutes each; the third, one-hour session was held on Saturday morning. Mercedes conducted race simulations to see how the cars would behave with a heavy fuel load. Rosberg was fastest in the first practice session with a lap time of 1:35.461, ahead of teammate Hamilton in second. Alonso was third-fastest, ahead of Valtteri Bottas, Kimi Räikkönen, Kevin Magnussen, Ricciardo, Jenson Button, Vettel and Daniil Kvyat. Verstappen's run ended early when he pulled over to the side of the track at the S curves with smoke billowing from his engine because of a broken exhaust valve, while Merhi spun at turn 13, causing Bottas to swerve to avoid him.

In the second session, Hamilton set the fastest lap of the day at 1:35.078. Rosberg, Bottas, Button, Vettel, Räikkönen, Alonso, Magnussen, Kvyat and Ricciardo completed the top ten. Some cars went off the track; Ricciardo disrupted the session for eight minutes when an oversteer sent him into a barrier at turn 18. Kobayashi lost control of the rear of his Caterham at turn three, damaging his rear suspension and front wing, while Vergne stopped his car on the back straight after exiting the Spoon Curve with a fuel pump problem. Esteban Gutiérrez later lost control of his Sauber entering the Spoon Curve and crashed into a tyre barrier. Vergne stopped a second time with an electrical problem after exiting turn 14; this resulted in a second red flag stopping the session early due to limited time available. Rosberg recorded the fastest lap of the third session at 1:33.228, ahead of Hamilton and Alonso. Felipe Massa, Bottas, Ricciardo, Magnussen, Vergne, Kvyat and Button occupied positions four through ten. Hamilton drove quickly into the first turn but ran wide onto a run-off area and collided with a tyre barrier, damaging the left front quarter of his car. Gutiérrez lost control of his car's rear at the exit of turn 15 but avoided a crash.

== Qualifying ==
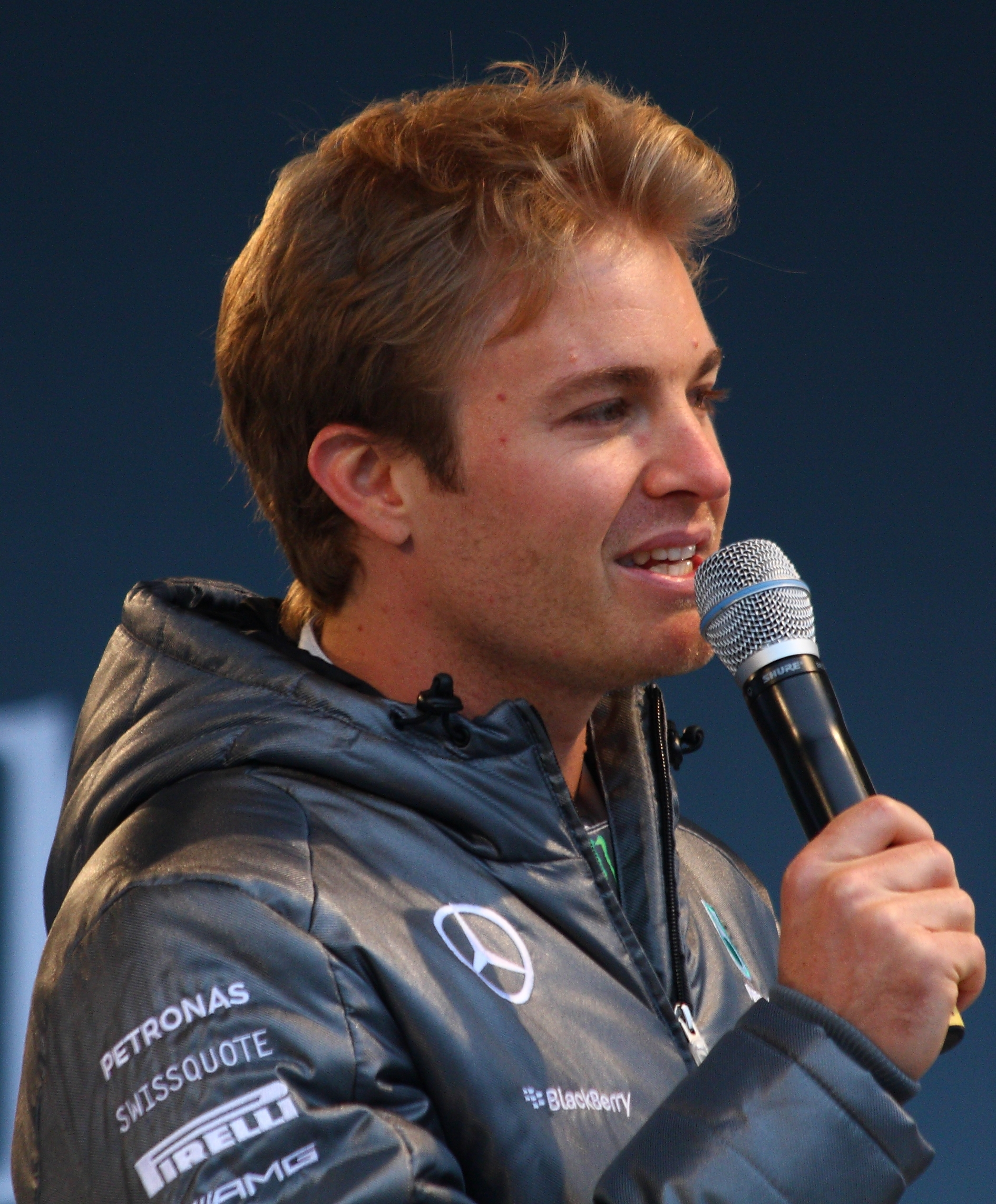
Nico Rosberg took the twelfth pole position of his career.

Saturday afternoon's qualifying session was divided into three parts. The first part ran for 18 minutes, eliminating cars that finished 17th or below. The 107% rule was in effect during this part, requiring drivers to set a time within 107 per cent of the fastest lap in order to qualify. The second part lasted 15 minutes, eliminating cars that finished 11th to 16th. The final session lasted 12 minutes and determined pole position to tenth. Cars who progressed to the final session were not allowed to change tyres for the race's start, using the tyres with which they set their quickest lap times in the second session. Rosberg set the fastest time in the second and third sessions to clinch his eighth pole position of the season, the twelfth of his career with a lap of 1:32.506. He was joined on the grid's front row by Hamilton, who missed out on pole position when, on his final lap, he hit the chicane curb before accelerating too fast into the final corner. Williams teammates Bottas and Massa qualified third and fourth, and Alonso and Ricciardo took fifth and sixth. Magnussen, whose mistakes on his quickest timed lap cost him time, took seventh. His McLaren teammate, Button, secured eighth and locked one of his tyres—flat-spotting it and slowing him. Vettel, struggling on corners due partially to Red Bull's use of wet tyres, took ninth. Räikkönen was tenth, encountering problems with his car's balance which prevented him from pushing.

Vergne was the fastest driver not to advance into the final session. Because his team had changed his engine, he received a ten-place grid penalty, his sixth of the season. This promoted Force India's Sergio Pérez to 11th position; he had encountered slower cars entering the final chicane, which forced him to slow and lose brake and tyre temperature. Kvyat's final timed lap was disrupted by slower cars; when he entered the first corner his tyres had not reached their optimum temperature, compromising his run and leaving him 12th. Nico Hülkenberg qualified 13th in the other Force India car after he locked his tyres at the final chicane. Adrian Sutil progressed to the second session after making balance set-up changes, and took 14th in its closing seconds; his Sauber teammate, Gutiérrez, struggled with tyre temperature and was delayed by traffic on his out-lap, leaving him 15th. Pastor Maldonado failed to advance beyond the first qualifying session, but Lotus installed a new engine (his sixth of the year) in his E22 chassis on Friday morning. Like Vergne, he incurred a ten-place grid penalty (carried over to the next race because he qualified within the top-ten bottom positions). His teammate, Romain Grosjean, took over 16th position and aimed to qualify higher; however, a change in wind direction prevented him from recording a faster lap time. Ericsson and Jules Bianchi started from 17th and 18th, with Kobayashi 19th and Vergne 20th. Chilton lost control of his Marussia's rear, causing him to start 21st.

=== Qualifying classification ===
The fastest lap in each of the three sessions is denoted in bold.

Pos.	No.	Driver	Constructor	Q1	Q2	Q3	Grid
1	6	(Germany) Nico Rosberg	Mercedes	1:33.671	**1:32.950**	**1:32.506**	1
2	44	(United Kingdom) Lewis Hamilton	Mercedes	**1:33.611**	1:32.982	1:32.703	2
3	77	(Finland) Valtteri Bottas	Williams-Mercedes	1:34.301	1:33.443	1:33.128	3
4	19	(Brazil) Felipe Massa	Williams-Mercedes	1:34.483	1:33.551	1:33.527	4
5	14	(Spain) Fernando Alonso	Ferrari	1:34.497	1:33.675	1:33.740	5
6	3	(Australia) Daniel Ricciardo	Red Bull Racing-Renault	1:35.593	1:34.466	1:34.075	6
7	20	(Denmark) Kevin Magnussen	McLaren-Mercedes	1:34.930	1:34.229	1:34.242	7
8	22	(United Kingdom) Jenson Button	McLaren-Mercedes	1:35.150	1:34.648	1:34.317	8
9	1	(Germany) Sebastian Vettel	Red Bull Racing-Renault	1:35.517	1:34.784	1:34.432	9
10	7	(Finland) Kimi Räikkönen	Ferrari	1:34.984	1:34.771	1:34.548	10
11	25	(France) Jean-Éric Vergne	Toro Rosso-Renault	1:35.155	1:34.984	N/A	20^{1}
12	11	(Mexico) Sergio Pérez	Force India-Mercedes	1:35.439	1:35.089	N/A	11
13	26	(Russia) Daniil Kvyat	Toro Rosso-Renault	1:35.210	1:35.092	N/A	12
14	27	(Germany) Nico Hülkenberg	Force India-Mercedes	1:35.000	1:35.099	N/A	13
15	99	(Germany) Adrian Sutil	Sauber-Ferrari	1:35.736	1:35.364	N/A	14
16	21	(Mexico) Esteban Gutiérrez	Sauber-Ferrari	1:35.308	1:35.681	N/A	15
17	13	(Venezuela) Pastor Maldonado	Lotus-Renault	1:35.917	N/A	N/A	22^{1}
18	8	(France) Romain Grosjean	Lotus-Renault	1:35.984	N/A	N/A	16
19	9	(Sweden) Marcus Ericsson	Caterham-Renault	1:36.813	N/A	N/A	17
20	17	(France) Jules Bianchi	Marussia-Ferrari	1:36.943	N/A	N/A	18
21	10	(Japan) Kamui Kobayashi	Caterham-Renault	1:37.015	N/A	N/A	19
22	4	(United Kingdom) Max Chilton	Marussia-Ferrari	1:37.481	N/A	N/A	21
107% time: 1:40.163

Notes:

- **^1** – Pastor Maldonado and Jean-Éric Vergne both received a ten-place grid penalty for exceeding their quota of five engine components for the season.

== Race ==
There was a large amount of standing water on the track at the start, since Typhoon Phanfone had brought heavy rain to the area. This made the circuit very slippery. The air temperature was 20 °C (68 °F), and the track temperature was 24 °C (75 °F). About 142,000 people attended the race. The standing water caused heavy spray and impaired visibility, and all cars used full wet tyres. The race began behind the safety car at 15:00 Japan Standard Time (UTC+09:00), with no formation lap; despite the slow speed, drivers struggled for grip on the wet surface. Ericsson lost control of his car after accelerating out of the final turn, spinning into a gravel trap; marshals pushed his car out of the gravel, allowing him to keep driving. Following complaints from Hamilton about poor visibility, the race was suspended after two laps because cars could not be driven in the wet conditions. The cars drove back into the pit lane, lined up in grid formation and their engines were shut off. Several cars had their ride heights raised to make them less prone to aquaplaning on their underbody planks. The race was restarted 20 minutes later behind the safety car, after the rain eased. Alonso stopped his car with an electrical issue – possibly a short circuit from the wet conditions – to become the race's first retirement on lap three. His departure promoted Ricciardo to fifth place, with Magnussen sixth and Button seventh.

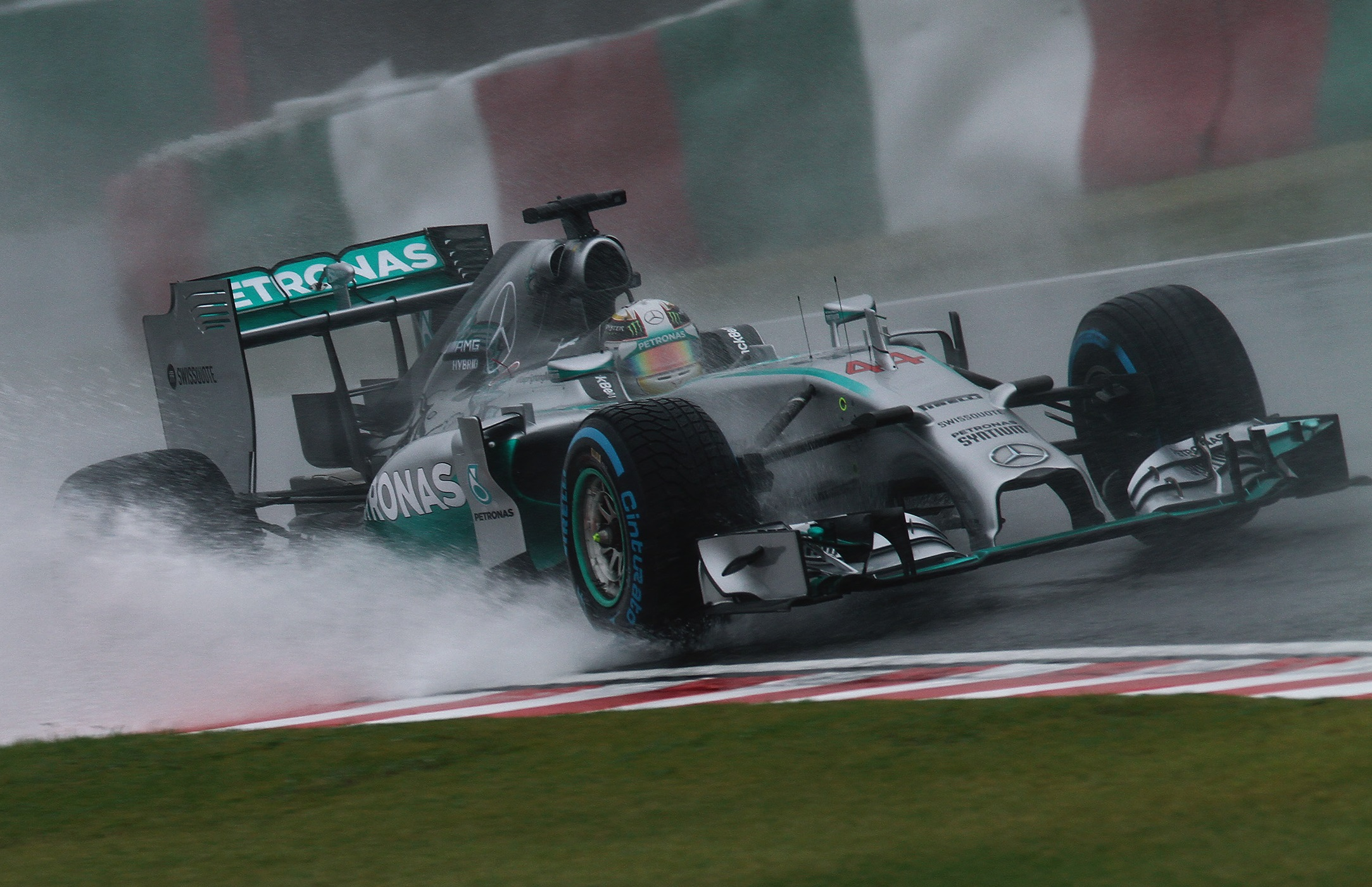
Lewis Hamilton won the shortened Grand Prix for Mercedes.

Although Hamilton became concerned about his Mercedes' brakes, he was told that it was a relatively minor sensor problem. He and Vergne reported that conditions had improved, but Vettel and Massa said that visibility remained poor. The safety car drove into the pit lane at the end of lap nine, and cars were allowed to overtake. Button immediately made a pit stop to fit intermediate tyres. Hamilton unsuccessfully attempted to overtake Rosberg heading into the first corner, while Vettel tried to pass Magnussen going into the hairpin, also without success; he then ran wide at the Spoon Curve but remained on the track. Pérez overtook Kvyat for ninth position on the lap. At the end of the first racing lap, Rosberg led Hamilton by 1.3 seconds; followed by Bottas, Massa, Ricciardo, Magnussen, Vettel, Räikkönen, Pérez and Kvyat.

Bottas, Ricciardo, Magnussen and Räikkönen made pit stops to change to intermediate tyres on lap 12. After his early pit stop, Button moved up to eighth place on the same lap. Massa and Vettel made their pit stops on lap 13, Vettel moving in front of Massa and rejoining ahead of teammate Ricciardo. Rosberg made his pit stop on lap 14 and rejoined in second position, 22 seconds behind Hamilton (who recorded fast sector times in an attempt to move ahead of Rosberg after the latter's pit stop). Hamilton went off onto the run-off area at the Spoon Curve, reducing the gap by one second. Rosberg reclaimed first position when Hamilton approached the exit of the pit lane after the latter's stop. He reported that his car was oversteering, and Button held a 6.5-second advantage over both Williams cars. The Red Bull cars reduced the gap to Massa in sixth by lap 16, with Vettel moving to the inside line and passing Massa with a narrow margin at the hairpin on this lap; Ricciardo then attempted a similar manoeuvre on the outside at the Spoon Curve, but Massa accelerated clear heading into 130R corner.

Magnussen made a second pit stop at the end of lap 16 to change his steering wheel. On lap 17 Ricciardo went to the outside of Massa on the S-curves and moved inside, passing Massa to move into sixth. Vettel overtook Bottas around the outside for fourth place on lap 18; Bottas then fell to sixth on lap 19 when Ricciardo passed him around the outside at the S-curves. Vettel began to reduce the gap to third-place Button, with Ricciardo driving at a speed similar to his teammate. Bottas was caught by his Williams teammate Massa, who pulled away from Hülkenberg (who went off the track at the second turn). Both Red Bull drivers were the fastest by lap 21, but Vettel was still 13 seconds behind Button and a further five seconds behind Rosberg, who now led Hamilton by only one second having run off the track at 130R. A dry line began to emerge by this time as some drivers drove through standing water to keep their tyre temperatures down.

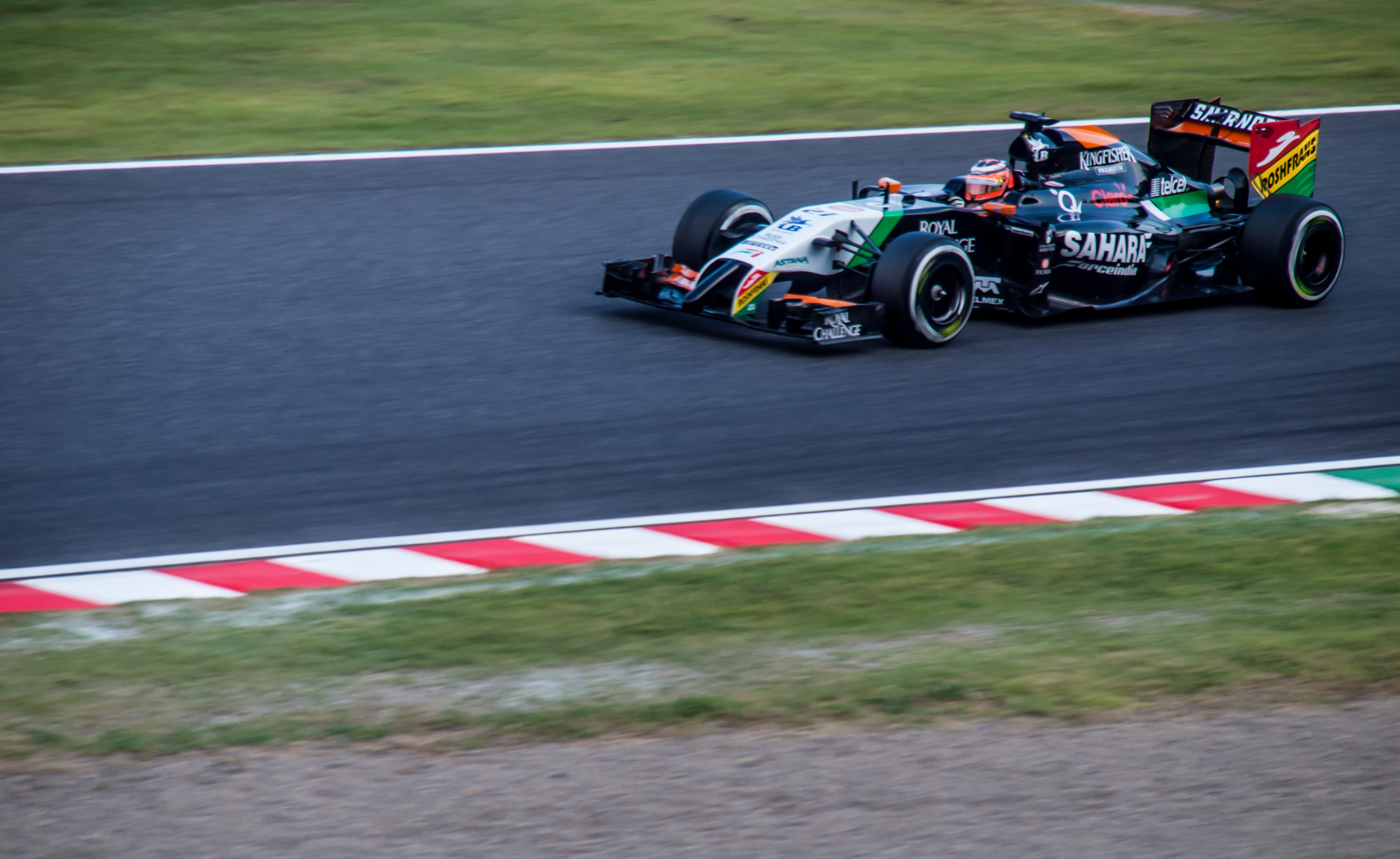
Nico Hülkenberg finished in eighth position for Force India.

DRS was enabled on lap 24. Although Hamilton had closed Rosberg's lead to half a second and used DRS, he could not pass his teammate. Räikkönen made a pit stop this lap, which went wrong as his mechanics struggled to install a right-front wheel nut correctly. Hamilton tried to pass Rosberg again the following lap by running in his slipstream, but Rosberg held the line and had enough acceleration to defend first place. Hamilton held a tighter line, while Rosberg complained of more oversteer on lap 26. On lap 27, Hamilton forgot to deactivate his DRS system and lost control of his rear; his brakes locked, and he went onto the turn one run-off area. However, he caught up to Rosberg and ran closely behind his teammate into the hairpin without trying to pass. Hamilton moved across the track during the lap in an attempt to pass; Rosberg's car shuddered, and Hamilton got a better run onto the pit-lane straight. He was in Rosberg's slipstream before passing him on the outside heading into the first turn to take the lead on lap 29. Hamilton pushed hard and pulled away from Rosberg, who lost control heading into the pit-lane straight.

Gutiérrez lost ninth position on lap 30 when he was passed by Kvyat, who drove through standing water on the inside of the pit lane straight and used DRS. Vettel made his second pit stop for intermediate tyres on the same lap, rejoining in fifth behind Ricciardo but ahead of both Williams cars. Button, still third, recorded faster lap times than Rosberg, closing the gap to 12.8 seconds by the beginning of lap 31. Pérez overtook Gutiérrez to take over tenth position on the same lap. Button made a second pit stop for new intermediate tyres at the end of lap 31; his pit crew also changed his steering wheel, lengthening the stop and putting him behind both Red Bull drivers. Vettel recorded a new fastest lap of the race at 1:51.915, 2.3 seconds quicker than Hamilton. Rosberg made his second pit stop, for new intermediate tyres, on lap 33 and came out behind Ricciardo. Magnussen experienced understeer and spun 360 degrees after running onto a run-off area. Hamilton made a pit stop at the end of lap 35 for new intermediate tyres, giving Ricciardo the lead. Heavy rain began to fall on lap 36; Ricciardo made his pit stop during this lap and rejoined fifth, behind Hamilton, Rosberg, Vettel and Button. On lap 38, Magnussen ran wide onto the first-turn run-off area, while Vergne went off the track at the second corner and Vettel drove into a gravel trap at the S-turns; all three drivers continued running. Ricciardo closed up to Button on the same lap and attempted to pass him around the inside at the hairpin; Button defended his position, and Ricciardo ran wide.

Hamilton recorded the overall fastest lap of the race on lap 39, at 1:51.600. From lap 40, weather conditions continued to deteriorate, resulting in DRS being disabled on lap 41; visibility was reduced due to fading light and low cloud cover, making locating standing water more difficult. Drivers were dazzled by the lights on their steering wheels. Ricciardo attempted to overtake Button again that lap by taking the inside lane into the hairpin, but Button took a wide line. Ricciardo finally got past at the hairpin on lap 42, with Button then making a pit stop for full wet tyres. On the same lap, Sutil aquaplaned into the outside tyre barrier at the left-hand Dunlop Curve (turn seven) atop a hill. Per the instructions of race control, double yellow flags instructing drivers to slow and be prepared to stop if need be were waved by the marshals at the corner to warn drivers about the incident, and Whiting did not use the safety car, citing the facts as presented to him did not warrant its deployment. Sutil was unhurt, and his car was extracted from the track by a heavy-duty tractor crane that lap which turned backwards toward a gap in the barrier. Then, on lap 43, Bianchi, who had ignored the yellow flags, lost control of his Marussia at 213 km/h (132 mph), veering right towards the run-off area on the outside the Dunlop Curve. Although he applied his throttle and brake pedals simultaneously, his fail-safe system did not work because the settings of his brake-by-wire system were incompatible.

Bianchi collided with the left-rear wheel of the tractor crane, which caused extensive damage to his car; its roll bar was destroyed as it slid underneath. The impact briefly jolted the tractor crane off the ground, causing Sutil's car (suspended in the air by the crane) to fall to the ground. Marshals moved away from the scene to avoid being struck by Bianchi's Marussia. Calculations in July 2015 indicated a peak of 254 g_{0} (2,490 m/s^{2}), and data from the FIA's World Accident Database, which sources information from racing accidents worldwide, indicate that Bianchi's impact occurred 2.61 seconds after loss of control, at a speed of 123 km/h (76 mph) and an angle of 55 degrees. Bianchi was reported unconscious after not responding to a team radio call or marshals. Marshals reported the accident, and safety and medical cars were dispatched. Bianchi was extricated from his car and treated at the crash site by the FIA medical crew before being taken by ambulance to the circuit's medical centre. Transport by helicopter was impossible due to the weather, so Bianchi was taken by ambulance with a police escort to Mie Prefectural General Medical Center in Yokkaichi, about 15 km (9.3 mi, a 32-minute drive) from the track.

A second red flag was waved on lap 46, bringing the race to an early end; the results were taken from the running order at the end of lap 44. Hamilton thus won from teammate Rosberg by 9.1 seconds, with Vettel twenty seconds further back in third. Ricciardo finished just under ten seconds behind his Red Bull teammate, and nearly half a minute ahead of Button. Massa, Bottas, Hülkenberg, Vergne and Pérez rounded out the points-scoring positions. Kvyat, Räikkönen and Gutiérrez filled the next three positions, each one lap behind Hamilton, with Magnussen, Grosjean, Maldonado, Ericcson, Chilton and Kobayashi the last of the classified finishers who were not involved in any incident. Bianchi and Sutil were classified in 20th and 21st, despite their accidents. Hamilton and Rosberg both led on two occasions, with Rosberg leading 26 of the 44 laps and Hamilton the other 18. Hamilton's victory was his eighth of the season and the 30th of his Formula One career. (Note: Hamilton had previously won in Japan at the Fuji Speedway in 2007 while driving for McLaren.)

=== After the race ===
Out of respect for the seriously injured Bianchi, the top three finishers did not spray champagne. At the podium interviews, conducted by the 1992 World Champion Nigel Mansell, Hamilton said that it had been a difficult race weekend and his speed near the end of the race was reminiscent of the 2008 British Grand Prix. Rosberg called it a good weekend for his team, and congratulated Hamilton on the victory. Vettel said that he was lucky that the safety car came out, and was happy with his performance. At a later press conference, Hamilton said that he was confident in his car's balance when he passed Rosberg on lap 28, and saw no difference in the amount of standing water on the track when more heavy rain fell. Although Rosberg's car was set up similar to Hamilton's, he was unhappy with its balance and tried to adjust it during his pit stop. According to Vettel, the weather was borderline and his team decided to make a pit stop when it deteriorated.

Bianchi's crash overshadowed the race. His father, Philippe, initially reported to L'Équipe that Bianchi was in critical condition with a head injury and was undergoing an operation to reduce severe cranial bleeding. The FIA then said that CT scans indicated that Bianchi sustained a "severe head injury" in the crash, and would be admitted to the intensive care unit after surgery. His family later reported that he had a diffuse axonal injury, a traumatic brain injury common in vehicle accidents involving quick deceleration. The first family update after Bianchi's emergency surgery was made by his father during the week of 13 October; the driver was reportedly in a "desperate" condition, with doctors saying that his survival would be a miracle. His father said that he drew hope from the emergence of seven-time world champion Michael Schumacher from his coma. Marussia also issued regular updates on Bianchi's condition, denying initial speculation about their role in the accident. Former FIA president Max Mosley described it as a "freak accident".

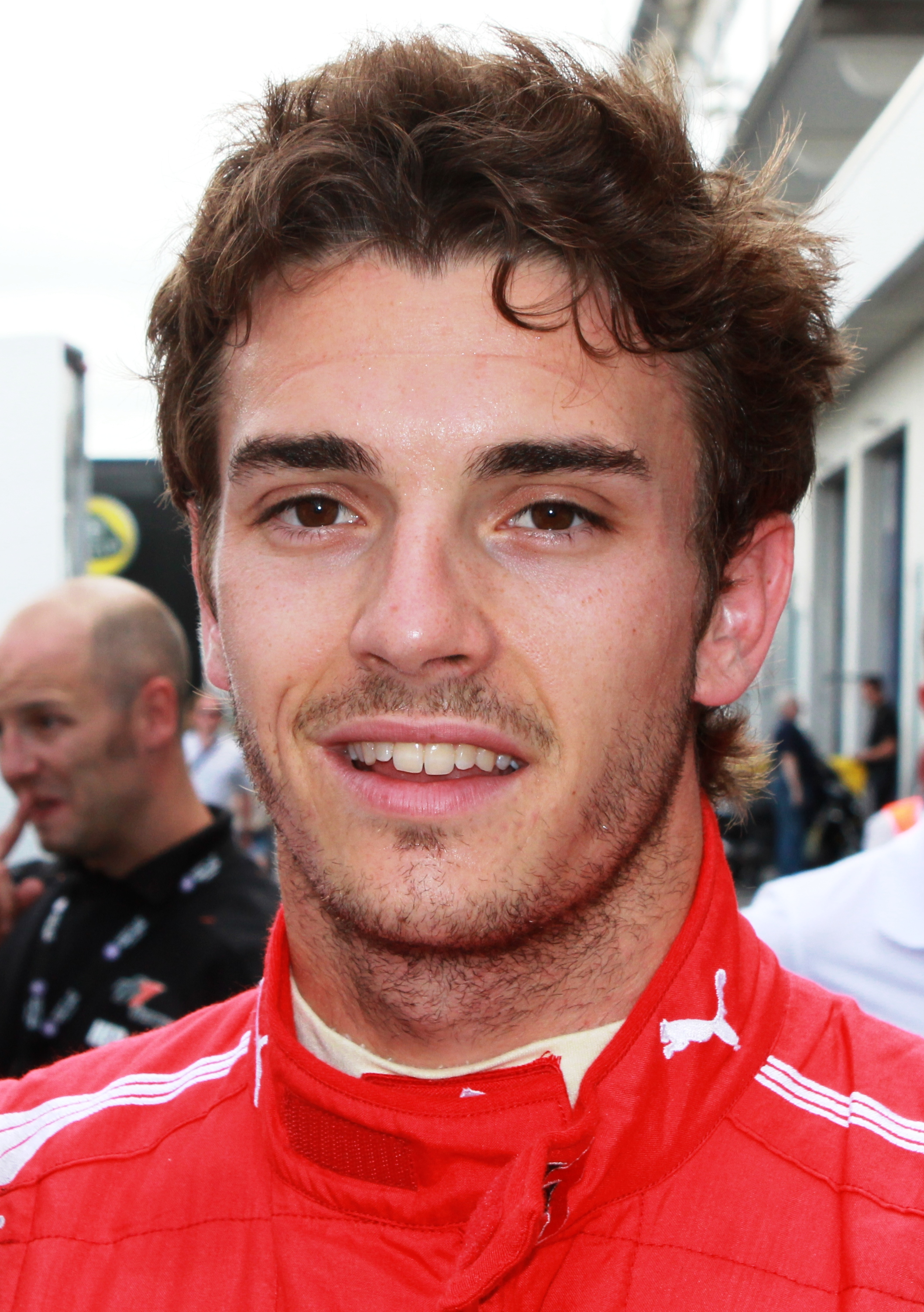
Jules Bianchi (pictured in 2012) was the first driver since Ayrton Senna to die in a Formula One accident, nine months after the race.

Controversy arose after an amateur video clip of Bianchi's crash, showing a marshal waving a green flag at the crash site, was uploaded to social media. (Note: The video, recorded by a spectator in a nearby grandstand, was removed from social media sites upon the orders of Formula One Management officials. As of 2025, the company has not released any official video footage of the accident.) Four-time world champion Alain Prost said that the marshal should have moved away from the crash scene, but five-time 24 Hours of Le Mans winner Emanuele Pirro said that it was normal practice and anyone who said otherwise was "mistaken". According to several commentators, the marshal committed no infraction. Former driver and Sky Sports F1 announcer Martin Brundle called for recovery vehicles to be barred from driving on the track. Driver steward Mika Salo defended Whiting's decision not to deploy the safety car after Sutil's crash, and minimised claims that the race was stopped for intensifying rain. TV Globo lead commentator Galvão Bueno, however, was vocal in his criticism of Whiting's decision, describing it as "the biggest mistake I've seen in 40 years in Formula One".

The FIA announced a ten-person review panel, composed of former drivers and team principals, to investigate the cause of the accident and published its findings four weeks later in Doha. (Note: The panel was led by the FIA's safety commission president Peter Wright and included former team principals Ross Brawn and Stefano Domenicali, chief stewards' representative Gerd Ennser, FIA drivers' commission president and former World Champion Emerson Fittipaldi, World Endurance Championship race director and future Formula One race director Eduardo Freitas, the circuits commission president, Roger Peart, Antonio Rigozzi, judge at the FIA's International Court of Appeal, the FIA institute and medical commission president, Gérard Saillant, and the Grand Prix Drivers' Association president, Alexander Wurz.) According to the report, there was no single cause of Bianchi's accident; contributing factors included track conditions, car speed and the presence of a recovery vehicle on the track. The report made several suggestions to improve safety when recovering disabled vehicles (which were introduced for 2015), and concluded that it would have been impossible to mitigate Bianchi's injuries with changes to cockpit design. It led to the introduction of the virtual safety car (VSC) by the FIA in 2015 after the governing body tested the system at three of the four final races of the 2014 season and the halo cockpit protection device on cars in 2018. Since 2015, for safety reasons, the FIA has required that the start time of certain Grands Prix be at least four hours before sunset or dusk (except for designated night races). FIA safety commission chairman Peter Wright was quoted in July 2015 as saying that a closed cockpit would not have prevented Bianchi's head injuries, and vice-president Andy Mellow confirmed that attaching impact protection to recovery vehicles was unfeasible.

Hospitalised in Yokkaichi, Bianchi remained in a critical but stable condition on a medical ventilator. He was removed from his induced coma in November and began breathing unaided, enabling him to be transferred to the Centre Hospitalier Universitaire de Nice (CHU) in Nice. Bianchi remained unconscious in critical condition there, but his family were better able to visit. On 13 July 2015, Bianchi's father said that he was "less optimistic" about his son's chances because of the lack of significant progress and the length of time since the accident. Bianchi died four days later, aged 25, thus becoming the first Formula One driver to be killed by injuries sustained during a Grand Prix since Ayrton Senna in 1994. (Note: Bianchi's granduncle, Lucien, was killed in a crash during a test session at the Circuit de la Sarthe in 1969.) Bianchi's funeral, on 21 July at Nice Cathedral, was attended by members of the Formula One community.

The race result increased Hamilton's lead over Rosberg in the World Drivers' Championship to ten championship points. Ricciardo and Vettel maintained third and fourth place, and Alonso remained in fifth despite his retirement. Mercedes moved further ahead of Red Bull in the Constructors' Championship, with a 180-point lead over the Austrian team. Williams increased their advantage over Ferrari in the battle for third, and Force India retained fifth place with four races left in the season.

=== Race classification ===
Drivers who scored championship points are denoted in bold.

Pos.	No.	Driver	Constructor	Laps	Time/Retired	Grid	Points
1	44	(United Kingdom) **Lewis Hamilton**	**Mercedes**	44	1:51:43.021	2	25
2	6	(Germany) **Nico Rosberg**	**Mercedes**	44	+ 9.180	1	18
3	1	(Germany) **Sebastian Vettel**	**Red Bull Racing-Renault**	44	+ 29.122	9	15
4	3	(Australia) **Daniel Ricciardo**	**Red Bull Racing-Renault**	44	+ 38.818	6	12
5	22	(United Kingdom) **Jenson Button**	**McLaren-Mercedes**	44	+ 1:07.550	8	10
6	77	(Finland) **Valtteri Bottas**	**Williams-Mercedes**	44	+ 1:53.773	3	8
7	19	(Brazil) **Felipe Massa**	**Williams-Mercedes**	44	+ 1:55.126	4	6
8	27	(Germany) **Nico Hülkenberg**	**Force India-Mercedes**	44	+ 1:55.948	13	4
9	25	(France) **Jean-Éric Vergne**	**Toro Rosso-Renault**	44	+ 2:07.638	20	2
10	11	(Mexico) **Sergio Pérez**	**Force India-Mercedes**	43	+ 1 Lap	11	1
11	26	(Russia) Daniil Kvyat	Toro Rosso-Renault	43	+ 1 Lap	12	
12	7	(Finland) Kimi Räikkönen	Ferrari	43	+ 1 Lap	10	
13	21	(Mexico) Esteban Gutiérrez	Sauber-Ferrari	43	+ 1 Lap	15	
14	20	(Denmark) Kevin Magnussen	McLaren-Mercedes	43	+ 1 Lap	7	
15	8	(France) Romain Grosjean	Lotus-Renault	43	+ 1 Lap	16	
16^{1}	13	(Venezuela) Pastor Maldonado	Lotus-Renault	43	+ 1 Lap	22	
17	9	(Sweden) Marcus Ericsson	Caterham-Renault	43	+ 1 Lap	17	
18	4	(United Kingdom) Max Chilton	Marussia-Ferrari	43	+ 1 Lap	21	
19	10	(Japan) Kamui Kobayashi	Caterham-Renault	43	+ 1 Lap	19	
20^{2}	17	(France) Jules Bianchi	Marussia-Ferrari	41	Fatal collision^{3}	18	
21^{2}	99	(Germany) Adrian Sutil	Sauber-Ferrari	40	Accident	14	
Ret	14	(Spain) Fernando Alonso	Ferrari	2	Electrical	5	

Notes:

- **^1** – Pastor Maldonado received a 20-second post-race time penalty for speeding in the pit-lane.
- **^2** – Jules Bianchi and Adrian Sutil were classified as they had completed 90% of the 44 laps used to determine the race result.
- **^3** – Jules Bianchi died on 17 July 2015 from injuries sustained during the accident.

== Championship standings after the race ==
Drivers' Championship standings

+/−	Pos.	Driver	Points
	1	(United Kingdom) Lewis Hamilton*	266
	2	(Germany) Nico Rosberg*	256
	3	(Australia) Daniel Ricciardo*	193
1	4	(Germany) Sebastian Vettel	139
1	5	(Spain) Fernando Alonso	133

Constructors' Championship standings

+/−	Pos.	Constructor	Points
	1	(Germany) Mercedes*	522
	2	(Austria) Red Bull Racing-Renault*	332
	3	(United Kingdom) Williams-Mercedes	201
	4	(Italy) Ferrari	178
	5	Force India-Mercedes	122
Sources:

- Note: Only the top five positions are included for both sets of standings.
- Bold text and an asterisk indicates competitors who still had a theoretical chance of becoming World Champion.

== See also ==
- 1994 San Marino Grand Prix, the event of the previous fatal accident in Formula One.
- List of Formula One fatalities

== Explanatory notes and references ==
=== References ===
Previous race: 2014 Singapore Grand Prix	FIA Formula One World Championship; 2014 season	Next race: 2014 Russian Grand Prix
Previous race: 2013 Japanese Grand Prix	Japanese Grand Prix	Next race: 2015 Japanese Grand Prix
