= Cameron Earl =

British automotive engineer

- Born: 8 May 1923; Sculcoates, Yorkshire, England
- Died: 18 June 1952 (aged 29); Nuneaton, Warwickshire, England
- Occupation: Automotive engineer

Cameron Charles Earl (8 May 1923 – 18 June 1952) was a British automotive engineer.

== Early life ==
Earl was born in Yorkshire in 1923.

== German research ==
Earl was sent to Germany after the Second World War by the British Intelligence Objectives Sub-Committee to study the development of 1930s Grand Prix racing cars, and wrote an influential report about them. This report aided British engine designers by presenting them with secrets of German design, based on Earl's interviews with designers at Mercedes-Benz and Auto Union in April and May 1947, and blueprints he obtained.

== Death ==
Earl was a technical consultant for the English Racing Automobiles team, when, on 18 June 1952 during a test drive of racing car R14B at the Motor Industry Research Association's (MIRA) test track in Nuneaton, Warwickshire, his car overturned. Earl, aged 29, died in hospital from a fractured skull.
