= Racesafe Marshals Association =

The Racesafe Marshals Association is the organisation that provides marshals for the British Superbike Championship, the British round of the MotoGP world championship, the British rounds of the Superbike World Championship and for some other motorcycle races in the United Kingdom.

Racesafe was formed following initial meetings with the newly formed Motor Circuit Racing Control Board in October 1995. Subsequently the first marshal training day was held in February 1996 at Donington Park and the first meeting marshalled by Racesafe took place at Donington in April of that year.

Racesafe was created one year after the Motor Circuit Racing Control Board (MCRCB), which was formed to run the newly inaugurated British Superbike Championship for the 1995 season. Previously in the UK, national championship races had been organised under the auspices of the Auto-Cycle Union (ACU), with individual rounds marshalled by members of clubs local to the circuits where they took place. The intention of the MCRCB was to run a more commercial championship series than had previously been the case. With this objective a new marshals' organisation was convened, with the aim of ensuring that the marshalling was of a high and consistent standard at all championship rounds. This remains the aim of the association.

Organisation of Racesafe was loosely based on the system of marshalling for car racing in the United Kingdom, in that training was compulsory for all marshals, and that training had to repeated at intervals to remain a member. Up to 2011 Racesafe marshals were required to retrain every two years to remain members. At the end of 2011 this requirement was changed to every three years for marshals who have completed two training days and perform satisfactorily at the required number of events. On-line training and testing was introduced in 2013 for fully experienced marshals. Racesafe also introduced compulsory uniforms for marshals and issued all those completing training with an association membership card which could be used to marshal at any British Superbike round, a training record card, and for novice marshals an attendance card. Racesafe Marshals who have completed their first training day are considered to be novices until they have completed at least 12 days marshalling and a second training day.

In 2018 Racesafe Marshals Association are responsible for supplying marshals to the British Superbike championship, the World Superbike Championship round at Donington Park, and the UK MotoGP round at Silverstone. In addition they also support the No Limits Racing club series.
