= Motorsport marshal =

Workers responsible for the safety of motor racing competitors

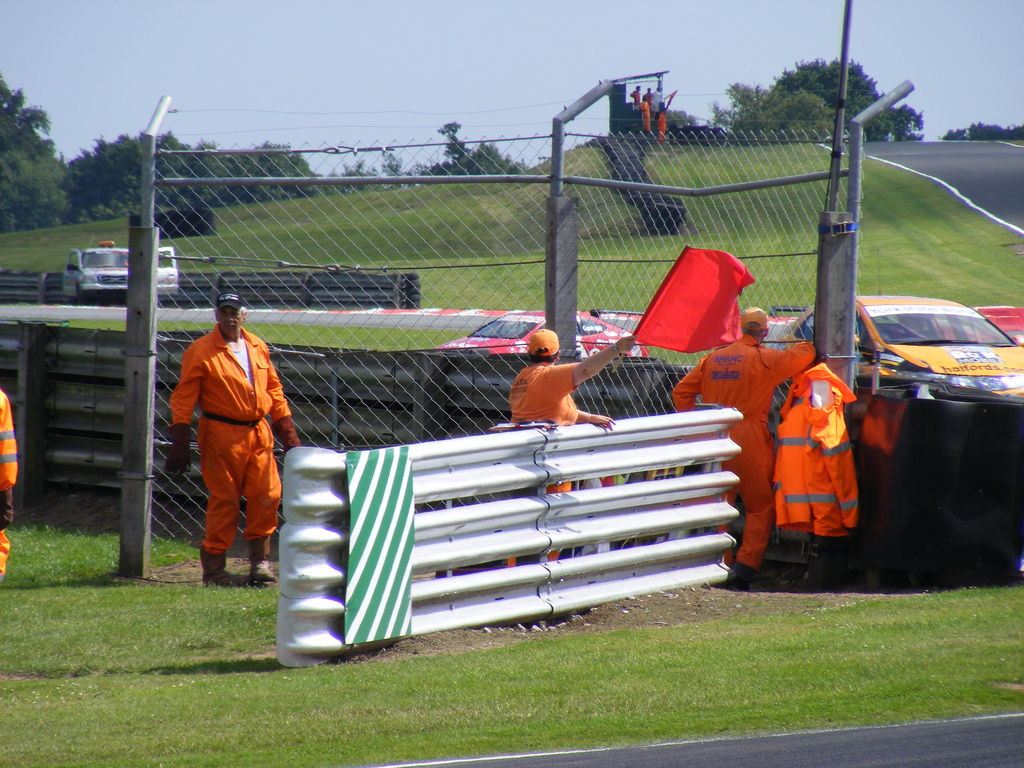
Track marshals in Britain, in this case waving a red flag

A motorsport marshal is an individual responsible for the safety of motor racing competitors. They are stationed at various points of danger around race tracks to assist in case of any collisions, accidents, or track problems. Marshals are also known as course workers, corner workers, corner crews, turn marshals, corner marshals, track safety workers, or (in rallying) rally marshals.

== Duties ==
=== Chief track marshal ===
Often a Chief Track Marshal's responsibilities will include the supervision and briefing of marshals for all daily activities, allocation of day-to-day marshaling duties; provision of marshal's vehicles, training of all marshals for incident handling, flag signalling, fire fighting, communications and basic track first aid as well as monitoring of health and safety on site to ensure the safety of all guests and personnel off-track. During the race the Chief Track Marshal's role is running the radio "network" and communication with all other track marshals as "net control".

Historically, the most successful Chief Track Marshals have been highly organized with good communication skills and additionally have previous experience in track marshaling or similar motor sport roles.

The Chief Marshal's line of command is Clerk of the Course. Chief Marshal works closely with Race Director, Chief Steward, and other senior race officials throughout preparation for the race, during the race, and post-race.

=== Off-track workers ===
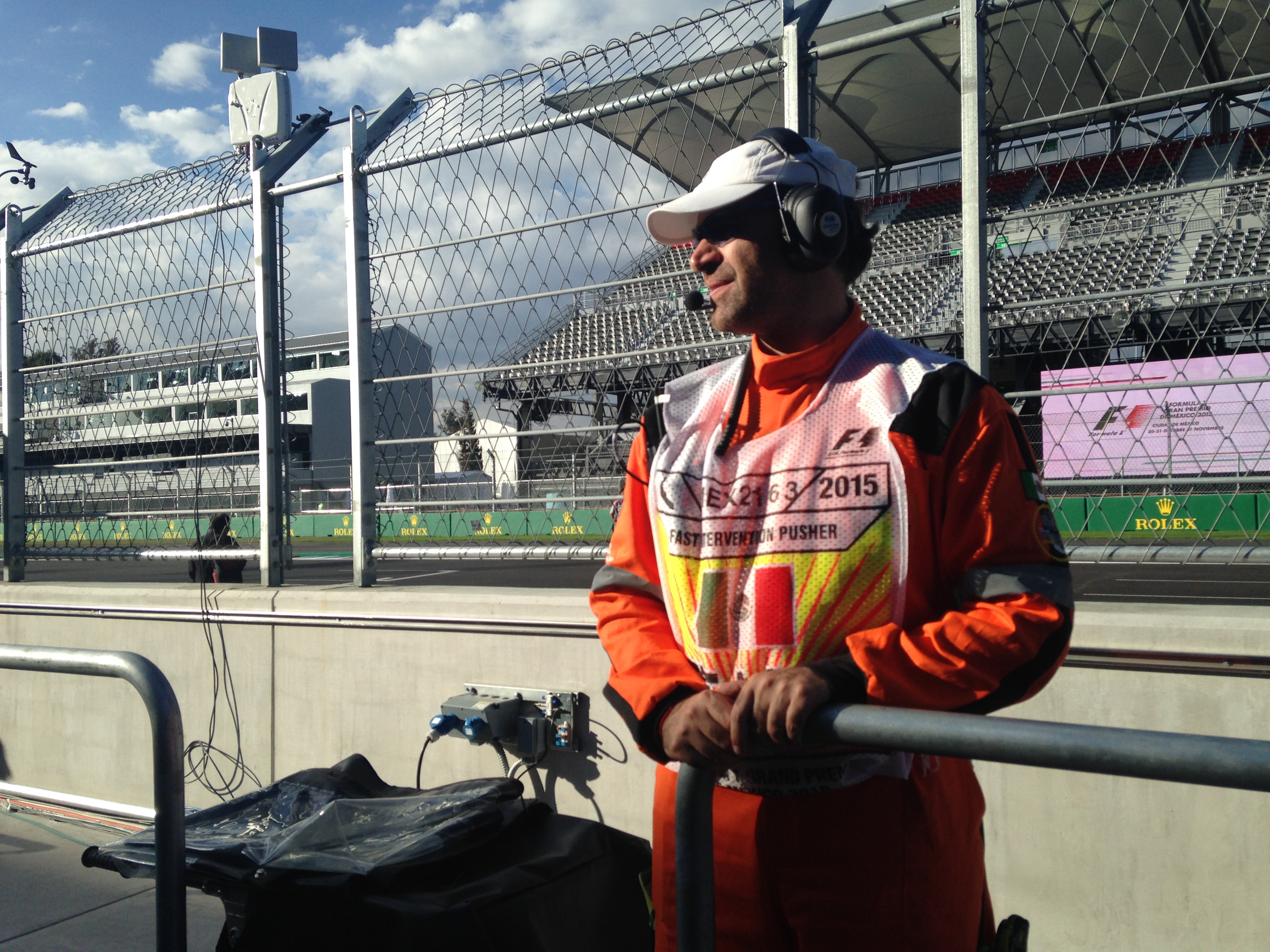
A track marshal at the 2015 Mexican Grand Prix

==== Time and scoring ====
In the dry, air-conditioned comfort of the tower with their stopwatches and computers, the timing and scoring personnel keep track of the progress of every car on each lap. They provide the qualifying times, lap charts, and determine the finishing order.

==== Pit and grid ====
Wearing distinctive shirts to set them apart from the pit crews and drivers, the pit and grid workers position the cars on the false grid, make last-minute safety checks, and are responsible for safety in the pit areas.

==== Registration ====
The registrars organize the official entries and provide passes and credentials. They are also the first people to meet the drivers, workers, and officials when they arrive at the track.

==== Sound control ====
Armed with sensitive detection equipment set up in a quiet portion on the track, these workers are responsible for ensuring that cars do not violate local or national sound control regulations.

==== Starters ====
Perched on their stand above the start/finish line, the starters control the start and finish of the practice and qualifying sessions and the races themselves. They also display the black flag signals when required.

==== Scrutineers ====
The tech inspectors make sure that every car meets series technical specifications and safety regulations before it is allowed onto the track. They also perform the post-race inspections.

==== Stewards ====
The stewards are responsible for the overall organization and operation of the event, and are particularly concerned with issues involving safety and the enforcement of the rules. Most stewards hold, or have held, a national competition license.

=== On-track workers ===
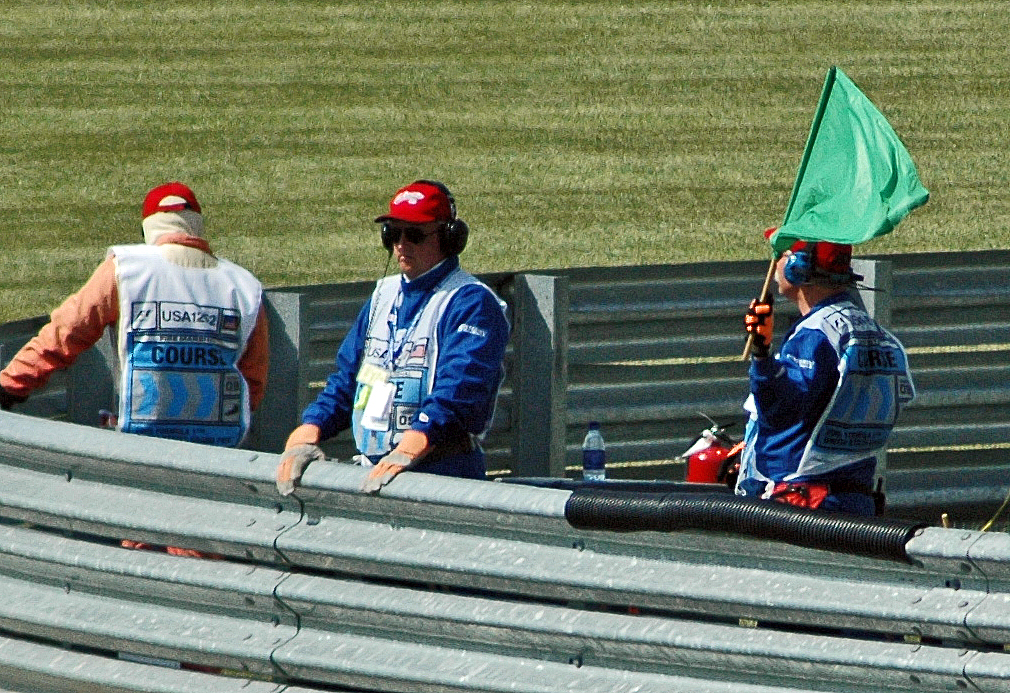
A flag marshal at the 2005 United States Grand Prix

==== Course marshals ====
The course marshals ensure that all required emergency equipment and vehicles (fire trucks, ambulances, wreckers etc.) are in place and ready to respond to an incident at a moment's notice. They are to give consistent information to drivers with racing flags and signals; assess the track surface condition; observe competitors for driving behavior and their cars' mechanical condition; help drivers and others in an incident; and communicate information to the stewards who are in charge of the event and rely on the accuracy of the workers' reports to make correct decisions.

==== Emergency services ====
These workers have training in medical response, fire fighting, and vehicle recovery.

==== Flagging and communications ====
Next to the competitors, these marshals are the most visible people on the track. They are viewed by the spectator as an integral part of the race, keeping the track clear, giving instructions to the drivers, and responding to incidents. These are the people who have the front row seats, with no-one getting any closer to the action unless they get their own racing car. They are highly trained to handle crashes, fire, the needs of drivers who may be injured, and track cleanup. They have other duties, too, including signalling the drivers with flags, helping spectators, and keeping their sections of the track organized so that racing can proceed efficiently. When handling crashes and fires, these volunteers have been called the "shock troops" of racing, because until the ambulances, fire trucks, and crash/rescue vehicles arrive, the safety and efficiency of the track is in their hands.

== Equipment ==
The marshal's outfit may include white or orange flame retardant overalls, a worker's safety tabard, safety boots, protective gloves such as welder's gloves, and a hat or protective headgear. Marshals may carry a whistle, a cutting tool such as a knife, and rope. In the United States specifically, there are the NFPA 610 guidelines to follow.

== Marshal post organization ==
All posts are organized essentially the same. The person in charge is called the corner captain. He or she directs the assignments of workers to such duties as flagging, incident response, and communications. The corner captain determines the section of track that the crew will maintain and coordinates this with corner stations "upstream" and "downstream" of race traffic direction. He or she assures that the communication link is working; that corner equipment (see below) is complete, functional, and properly distributed; that all guard rails and barriers are intact; and that the track is free of obstacles and is "ready to race". He or she coordinates with any emergency response vehicles in the area; assures that the station and surrounding area is kept free of press personnel and irrelevant officials; is responsible for keeping visiting personnel out of danger areas; and warns officials of any problems in the spectator areas like illness, altercations, or unsafe conduct.

In dealing with the corner "crew", the captain briefs the worker team about the day's activities; monitors crew levels of alertness and tactfully corrects anything that is wrong; monitors proper and quick flag use; directs the corner crew in the event of an incident; may dispatch a vehicle during an event at the directions of the stewards; and reports all incidents, including crashes and driver misconduct, in writing.

Besides the corner captain, the worker team is composed of these positions and duties:

The Communicator relays information between the station and the stewards, who receive this information through a head communicator known informally as "Control". The station communicator may maintain an informal log of events, and acts as an observer at the station.

The Yellow Flagger watches the track from his or her station to the next downstream station, assesses incidents, and displays yellow flag(s) as required. This worker always remains standing and ready while vehicles are on course, keeping the yellow flag ready for use, tucked under the arm and out of the competitor's sight.

The Blue Flagger watches upstream traffic for overtaking cars and displays the blue flag and other flags as required. He is responsible for keeping all flags other than the yellow flag available for instant display. He also is responsible for alerting the other workers if an incident is heading toward them requiring them to move.

The First Responder goes to incidents on or off the racing surface, assesses the situation and relays information to the stations. The worker assigned to this duty must understand vehicle velocities and trajectories. A worker responding to an incident with a fire extinguisher can run at about 8 mph. Therefore, to cross a track that is 40 feet (12 m) wide will require about 4 seconds, running at full speed. A race car traveling at 100 mph will require only 1/4 of a second to travel the same distance.

The Secondary Responder assists all other corner workers as requested by the corner captain. This worker also acts as an observer and reports to the Corner Captain as required.

Depending on the design of the race track, the main corner station may also have other subordinate stations behind barricades or protective safety fencing, where workers are stationed (a) to be closer to a possible area where crashes are likely, or (b) to be in a position where they can respond to an incident without crossing the track.

Corner equipment can vary from track to track, but usually includes a communication system of either telephone lines or radios: a set of race control flags; brooms and oil/coolant absorbent material; fire extinguishers and fire-resistant gloves; pry bar; a supply of corner report forms; and perhaps a first aid kit, bug spray, and other amenities. Most, though not all, corners have gazebos for protection from sun and wind. The average station area is about 400 sq ft (37 m^{2}), and may be square where concrete or grass pad is available, or long and narrow behind barriers. No matter what the shape, the station must be visible so approaching drivers can see flags and hand signals.

== Rally marshaling ==
A rally marshal is a marshal experienced or trained in the area of rallying.

They hold different duties than a track marshal, as they are isolated from other marshals with radio cars spaced out along the length of a stage. They are there for the safety of the competitors, but in spectated rallies, they also may be required to control any spectators that may be posing a safety risk.

Spectators can be of great danger to the drivers than on a track race, and if not aware of the cars they may also put themselves in great danger. Marshals announce the imminent arrival of a car by blowing a whistle to alert the spectators to be ready and to clear the track and sidelines.

== Marshal organizations ==
=== United Kingdom ===
Almost all British marshals are unpaid volunteers supplemented occasionally by certain paid crews for special duties. Marshals are registered with the British governing body, Motorsport UK and are often members of organisations such as the British Motorsport Marshals Club (BMMC), Scottish Motorsport Marshals Club (SMMC), British Automobile Racing Club (BARC) and the Silverstone Marshals Team amongst many others. British marshals have been known to attend foreign events such as IndyCar, the Abu Dhabi Grand Prix and many F1 events worldwide. Motorcycle marshals are organized differently, with support for FIM events coming from Racesafe and Racesafe-accredited marshals.

=== North America ===
Volunteer workers, usually members of the Sports Car Club of America (SCCA), are unpaid, incurring their own expenses and buying their own equipment to support a sport they love. These volunteers represent the majority of the workers for all other United States road racing activities.

Although they are SCCA members, the workers themselves organize into either loose or highly regulated operational units that are separate from their membership in SCCA. Two of the oldest and most well known are the United States Auto Race Marshals (USARM), organized in 1964, and Lake Erie Communications, organised in 1962. Other less regulated worker organizations include the Texas Turn Marshals & Racer Chasers, the Leaping Lizards Corner Crew of Kansas City, the Swamp Rats from Florida, Michigan Turn Marshals (MTM), Race Services Inc. at Watkins Glen International and others. All of these worker groups emphasise camaraderie and professionalism among the workers to complement the competition of the drivers.

Bobby Unser, three-time Indianapolis 500 champion and competitor in all forms of racing, once paid SCCA workers a great compliment, albeit an ironic one, when he said during a televised racing broadcast: "These SCCA workers may be volunteers, but they're no amateurs. They're as professional as anyone in the sport."

=== Azerbaijan ===
Baku Marshals Club was established by Baku City Circuit Operations Company on February 16, 2016, to develop communication and coordination, empower team spirit and build a strong relationship among Marshals.

"Baku Marshals Club" is also responsible for branding, promo, organizing events and communicating with local and international Marshals as well as managing Baku Marshals Center.

One of the main objectives is to evolve Marshalling movement and expand this type of activity in Azerbaijan.

=== Italy ===
Almost all Italian marshals are volunteers, with a few being paid employees of the track owner, usually the Race Director and the Clerk of the Course. All Marshals are registered with the Italian governing body, the ACI, which oversees both on track marshals and off track personnel, such as security and stewards. While the license is valid both nationally and internationally, each circuit has its own group of marshals that is governed by the provincial ACI branch, for example for the Autodromo di Monza the ACI branch is the Automobile Club of Milano (ACM) while for Autodromo Enzo e Dino Ferrari of Imola is the Automobile Club of Bologna. Italian marshals have been known to also participate in various international events, like the 24h of Le Mans or the F1 Monaco Grand Prix.

== See also ==
- Racesafe Marshals Association
