= Lotus 63 =

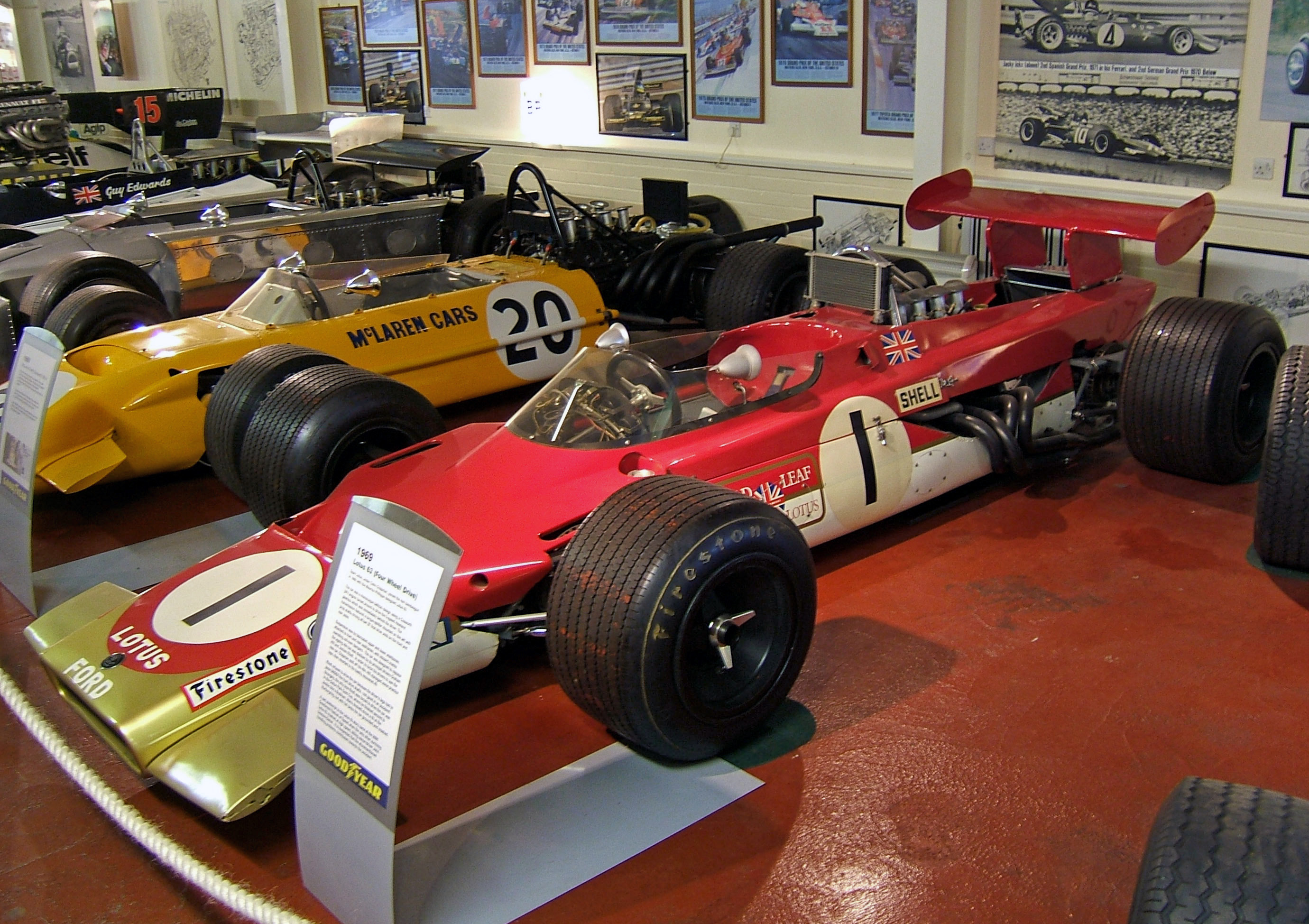
- Category: Formula One
- Constructor: Team Lotus
- Designers: Colin Chapman (Technical Director); Maurice Philippe (Chief Designer)
- Predecessor: 49
- Successor: 72

Technical specifications
- Chassis: Aluminium monocoque.
- Axle track: 59 in (1,499 mm)
- Wheelbase: 98 in (2,489 mm)
- Engine: Ford Cosworth DFV 2,995 cc (183 cu in) V8, naturally aspirated, mid-mounted.
- Transmission: Hewland-Lotus 5-speed manual gearbox. Four-wheel drive.
- Weight: 600 kg (1,323 lb)
- Fuel: Shell
- Tyres: Firestone

Competition history
- Notable entrants: Gold Leaf Team Lotus; Ecurie Bonnier
- Notable drivers: (United Kingdom) John Miles (United States) Mario Andretti (Sweden) Jo Bonnier
- Debut: 1969 French Grand Prix
Races	Wins	Podiums	Poles	F/Laps
7	0	0	0	0
- Unless otherwise stated, all data refer to Formula One World Championship Grands Prix only.

The Lotus 63 was an experimental Formula One car using four-wheel drive, designed by Colin Chapman and Maurice Philippe for the 1969 season. Chapman's reasoning behind the car was that the 3 litre engines introduced in 1966 would be better served by building a car that could take full advantage of its power while retaining the Lotus 49's simplicity.

== Development ==
Like the Lotus 56 for the Indy 500 (and later F1), the 63 chassis was designed around a four wheel drive system. This was not totally revolutionary at the time, as four wheel drive had been used on the Ferguson P99 F1 car that won at Oulton Park as early as 1961, but with little development thereafter.

However, it was not a successful design. In fact, the Matra MS84 was the only 4WD F1 which scored points (driven by Johnny Servoz-Gavin, at the 1969 Canadian Grand Prix) something neither Lotus nor McLaren managed, while Cosworth did not even race their 4WD design. The 63 was an evolution of the 49, but featured wedge shaped rear bodywork and integrated wings, which would be used to great effect in the Lotus 72.

== Racing history ==
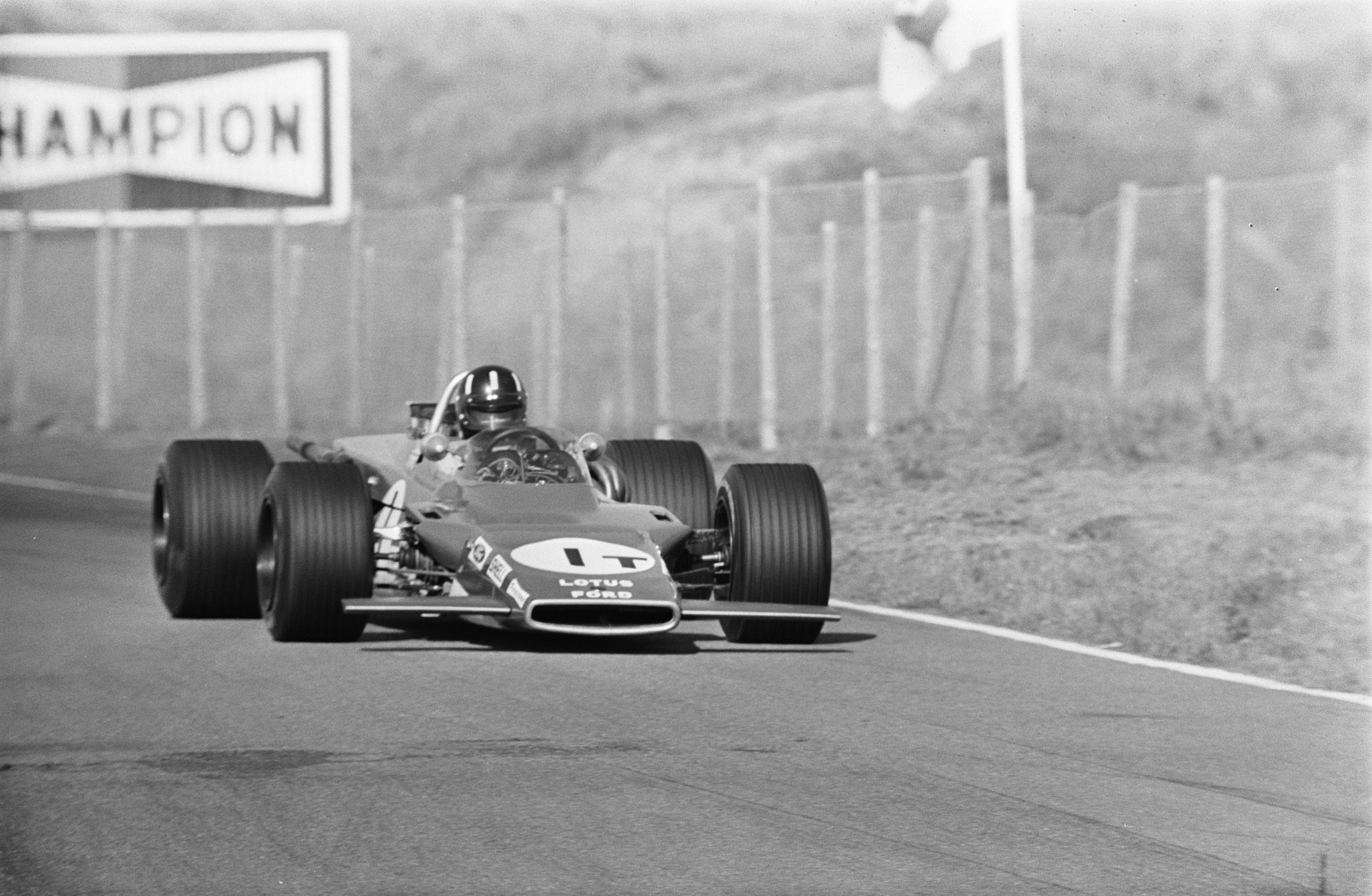
Graham Hill practising the 63 at the 1969 Dutch Grand Prix.

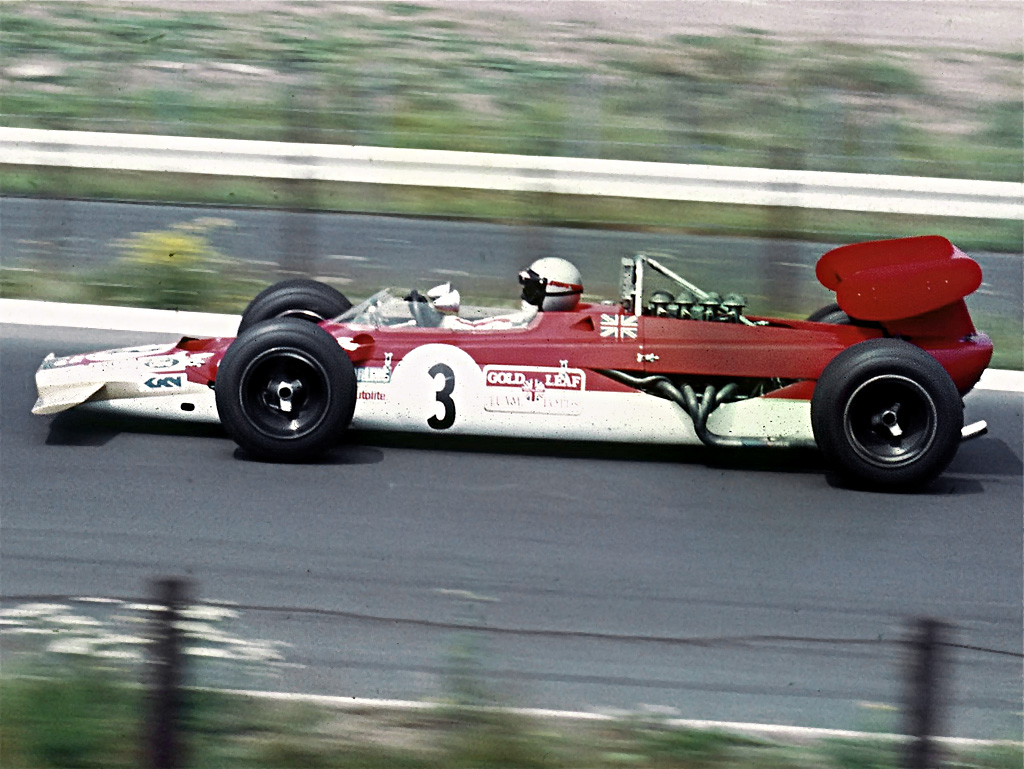
Mario Andretti racing the 63 at the 1969 German Grand Prix.

John Miles, Lotus' third driver, was entrusted with the task of developing the car, while Graham Hill and Jochen Rindt used the 49 in the early races of 1969. The 63 proved difficult to drive and set up, and the four wheel drive system was especially problematic. After a single test run, Hill flatly refused to drive the car again stating it was a 'deathtrap,' as did Rindt, who agreed with Hill after taking the car to its best result, 2nd in the non-championship Oulton Park Gold Cup. This infuriated Chapman as he saw the 63 as another quantum leap ahead of its rivals, just as its predecessors had been.

The car was entered at the 1969 British Grand Prix as a test run. Whilst Rindt finished fourth in the older 49 behind Jackie Stewart after running short of fuel whilst leading, Miles could only bring the 63 home in 10th place, confirming the car's uncompetitiveness. After several other fruitless outings, the 63 was abandoned.

== Aftermath ==
Parts of the chassis design were worked into the Lotus 72, which debuted in 1970, and four wheel drive technology returned into F1 with the Lotus 56B in 1971.

Like the Lotus 88, the 4WD cars proved to be huge white elephants for Lotus, but it paved the way for better models to follow.

== Complete Formula One World Championship results ==
(key) (results in bold indicate pole position; results in italics indicate fastest lap)

Year	Entrant	Engine	Tyres	Driver	1	2	3	4	5	6	7	8	9	10	11	Points	WCC
1969	Gold Leaf Team Lotus	Ford Cosworth DFV	F		RSA	ESP	MON	NED	FRA	GBR	GER	ITA	CAN	USA	MEX	42	**3rd**^{1}
1969	Gold Leaf Team Lotus	Ford Cosworth DFV	F	Graham Hill				PO		PO						42	**3rd**^{1}
1969	Gold Leaf Team Lotus	Ford Cosworth DFV	F	John Miles					Ret	10		Ret	Ret		Ret	42	**3rd**^{1}
1969	Gold Leaf Team Lotus	Ford Cosworth DFV	F	Mario Andretti							Ret			Ret		42	**3rd**^{1}
1969	Gold Leaf Team Lotus	Ford Cosworth DFV	F	Jochen Rindt									PO			42	**3rd**^{1}
1969	Ecurie Bonnier	Ford Cosworth DFV	F	Jo Bonnier						Ret						42	**3rd**^{1}

^1 All Points Scored by the Lotus 49

== Non-Championship Formula One results ==
(key)

Year	Entrant	Engine	Tyres	Drivers	1	2	3	4
1969	Gold Leaf Team Lotus	Ford Cosworth DFV	**F**		ROC	INT	MAD	OUL
1969	Gold Leaf Team Lotus	Ford Cosworth DFV	**F**	Jochen Rindt				2
