= Safety in Formula One =

Motorsport safety

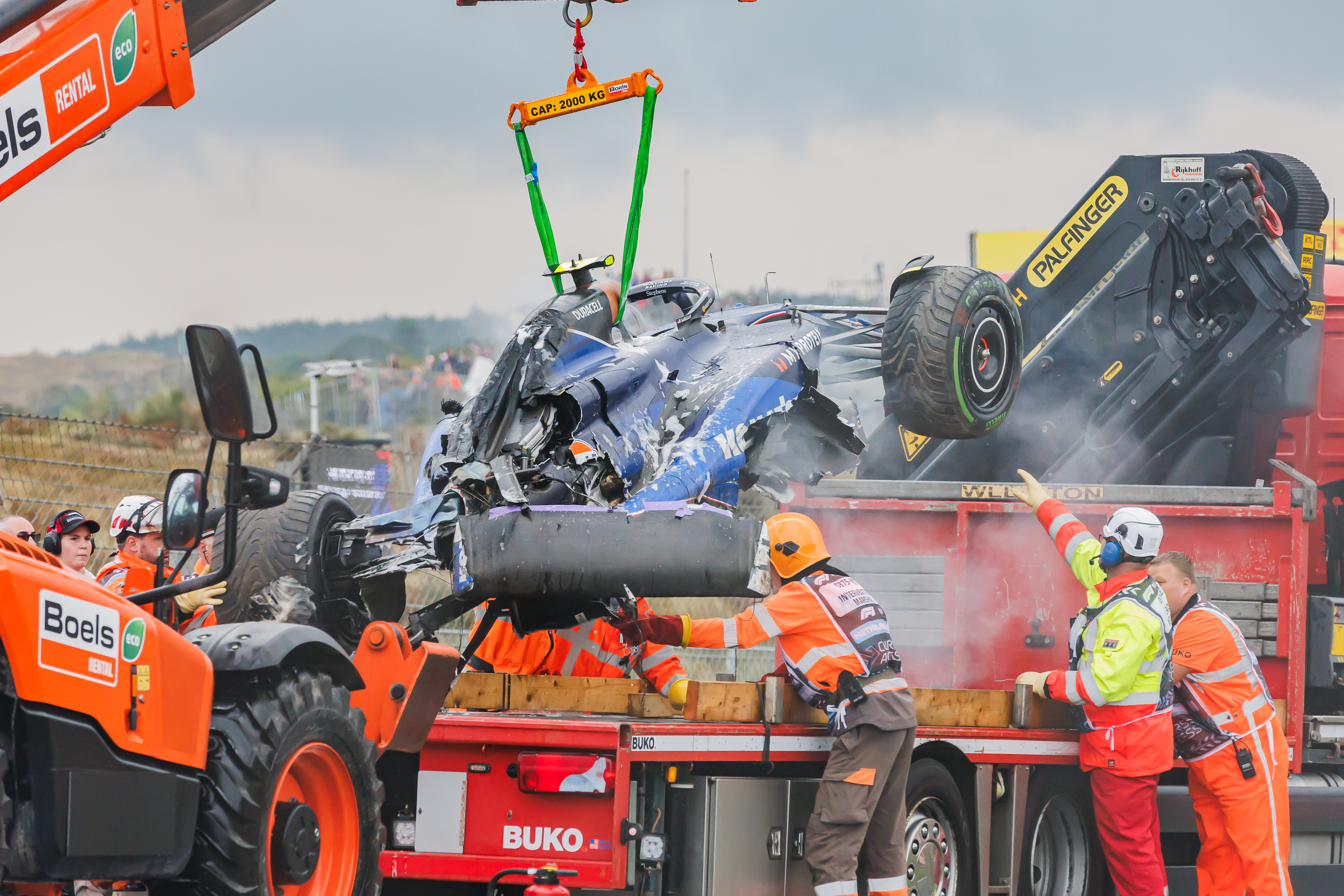
Logan Sargeant's Williams FW46 being recovered by marshals following a 2024 crash

Safety in Formula One has significantly improved since the inaugural Formula One World Championship in 1950. There have been major regulatory changes across different aspects of the sport in an effort to reduce the risk of fatalities and injuries. Many modifications to the design of Formula One cars have been influenced by safety concerns, specifically in the interest of protecting the driver. Driver protection is aided by various developments worn by the driver themselves, such as full-face helmets, head and neck support, racing suits, and seatbelts. The way that the Fédération Internationale de l'Automobile (FIA)—the sport's governing body—responds to incidents also plays a crucial factor in ensuring safety, including the use of marshals and an on-site medical team. Further, the design of racing circuits have been modified to safeguard drivers and fans alike. This has been done by implementing barriers between the circuit and spectators, run-off areas, and occasionally adjusting the circuit itself. Many of these innovations were not present in the early days of the World Championship, in which fatalities were exceedingly common.

== Background ==
As of the 2026 British Grand Prix, there have been 33 fatalities during World Championship Grands Prix. There were no World Championship fatalities between the 1994 San Marino Grand Prix and 2014 Japanese Grand Prix, widely attributed to safety reforms following the death of Ayrton Senna and Roland Ratzenberger. The death of Jules Bianchi, which remains the most recent World Championship fatality, led to the introduction of virtual safety cars and played a role in the implementation of the halo device.

== Car design ==
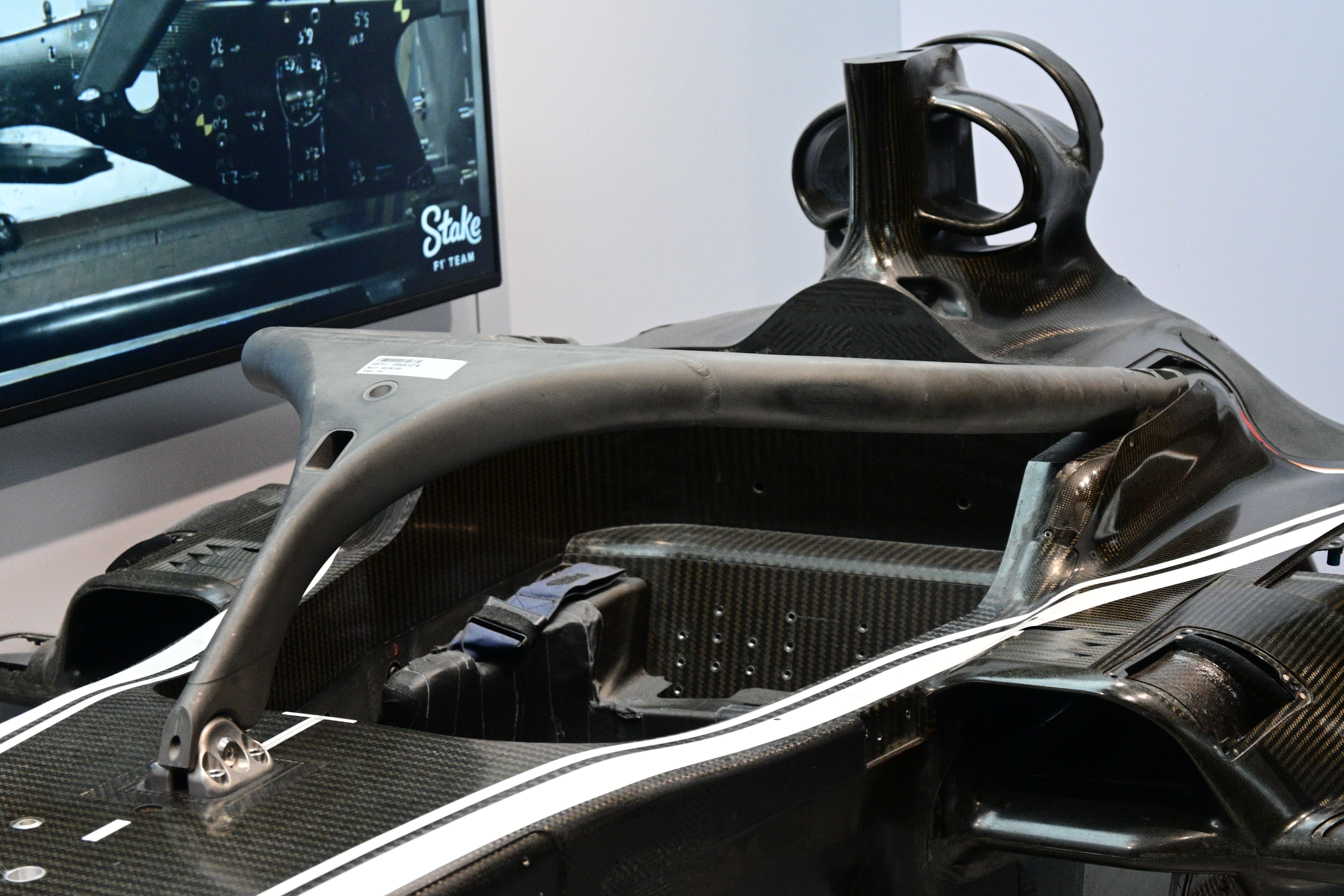
A halo made out of carbon fibre; the halo in Formula One is constructed from titanium.

The use of carbon-fibre monocoques, also called survival cells, have been used in Formula One since the McLaren MP4/1 was introduced in 1981. Monocoques help protect drivers during collisions and high-speed impacts by absorbing kinetic energy and reducing the risk of blunt force trauma.

Crash tests were introduced in 1985, initially only to the front of the car. Following the deaths of Senna and Ratzenberger in 1994, the number of crash tests was increased, with the addition of side-impact and roll hoop tests. These were made more challenging to achieve over time, with the 2025 technical regulations including nearly 20 different impact tests.

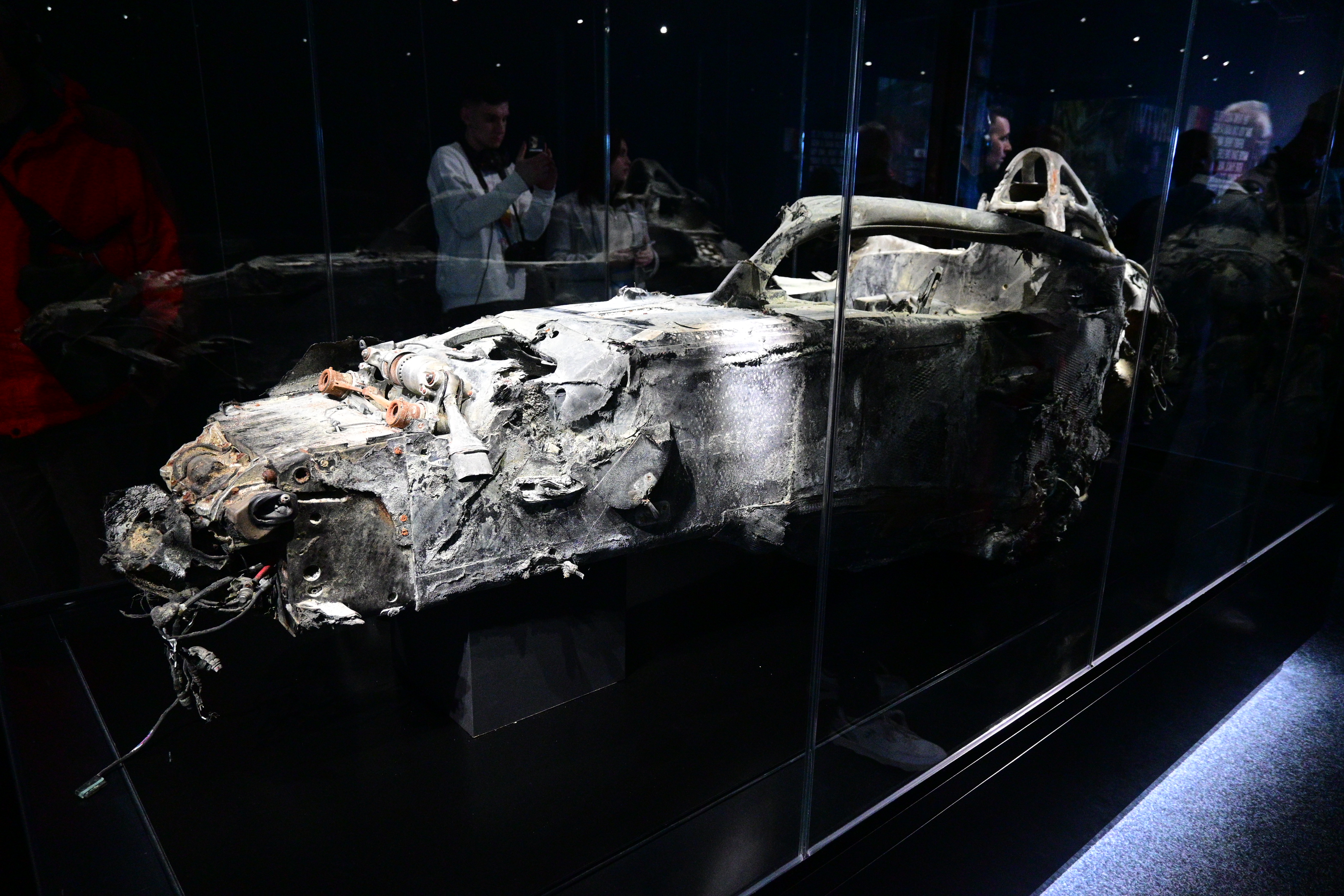
Romain Grosjean's Haas VF-20 after a 2020 incident

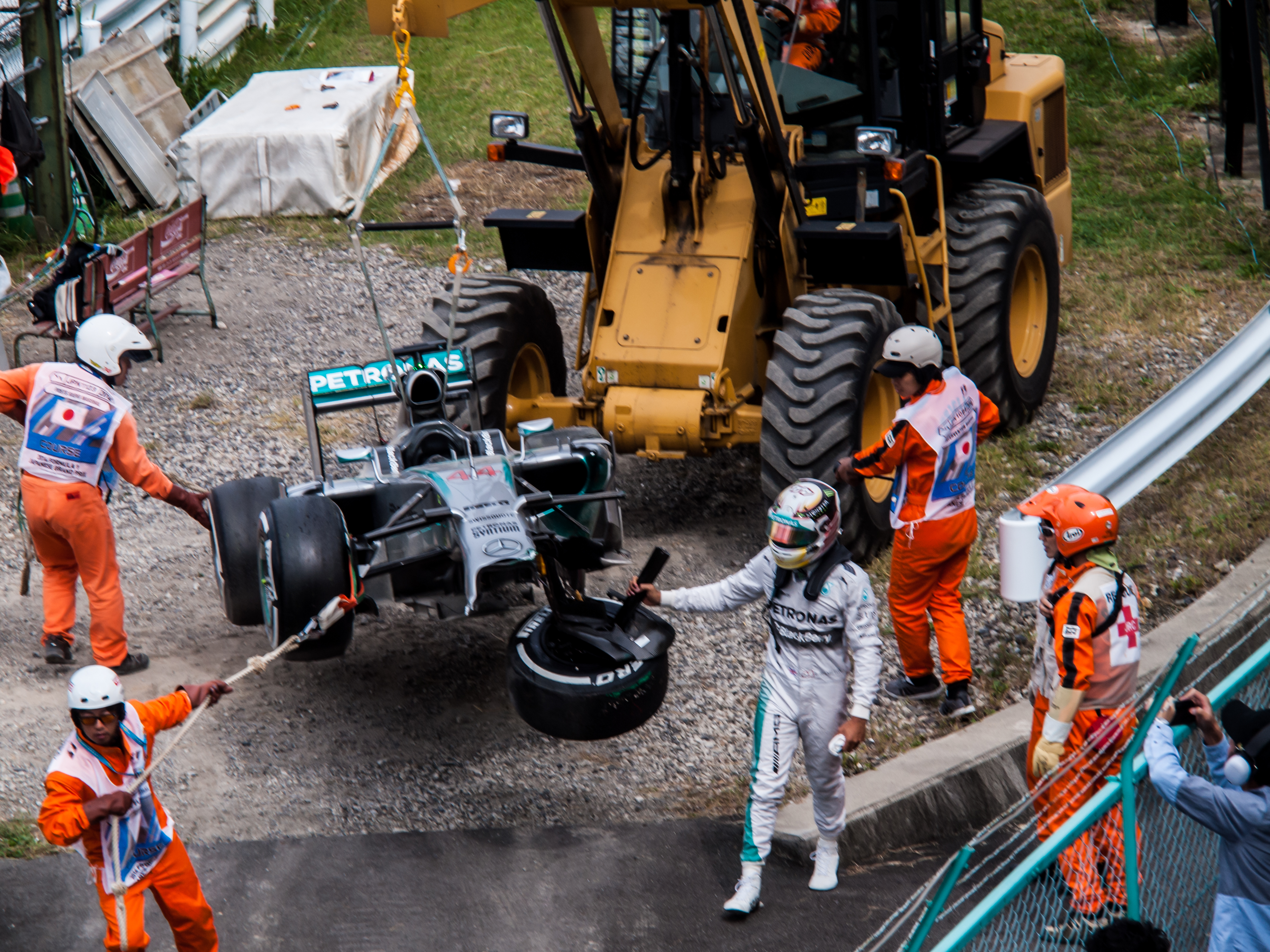
Lewis Hamilton holding a broken piece of his car following a crash during a practice session in 2014

For 2018 onwards, the FIA mandated the use of the halo device on all cars. The halo—which is constructed from titanium—aims to protect the driver's from debris. While other options were considered, including an aeroscreen developed by Red Bull Racing and the "Shield", the halo was ultimately chosen. The halo was initially controversial, prompting scepticism from drivers and critics. Since then, the device has been credited with potentially saving multiple lives during on track incidents, most notably: Charles Leclerc during the 2018 Belgian Grand Prix, Romain Grosjean during the 2020 Bahrain Grand Prix, Lewis Hamilton during the 2021 Italian Grand Prix, and Zhou Guanyu during the 2022 British Grand Prix. In addition to the halo, roll hoops are placed in front and behind the driver to prevent contact with the surface in the event of a rollover.

Beginning in 1999, (Note: Sources vary between 1998 and 1999, but a majority say that wheel tethers were introduced in 1999.) Formula One cars were required to have a single wheel tether made out of zylon to prevent tyres from detaching at high speeds. The single wheel tether design had two notable failures, with marshal deaths occurring at the 2000 Italian and the 2001 Australian Grands Prix due to loose wheels. A second wheel tether was introduced for 2011 ensuing an increase in accidents, such as Henry Surtees's fatal crash during the 2009 FIA Formula Two Championship. A third wheel tether was introduced for the 2018 season.

== Driver protection ==
=== Helmets ===
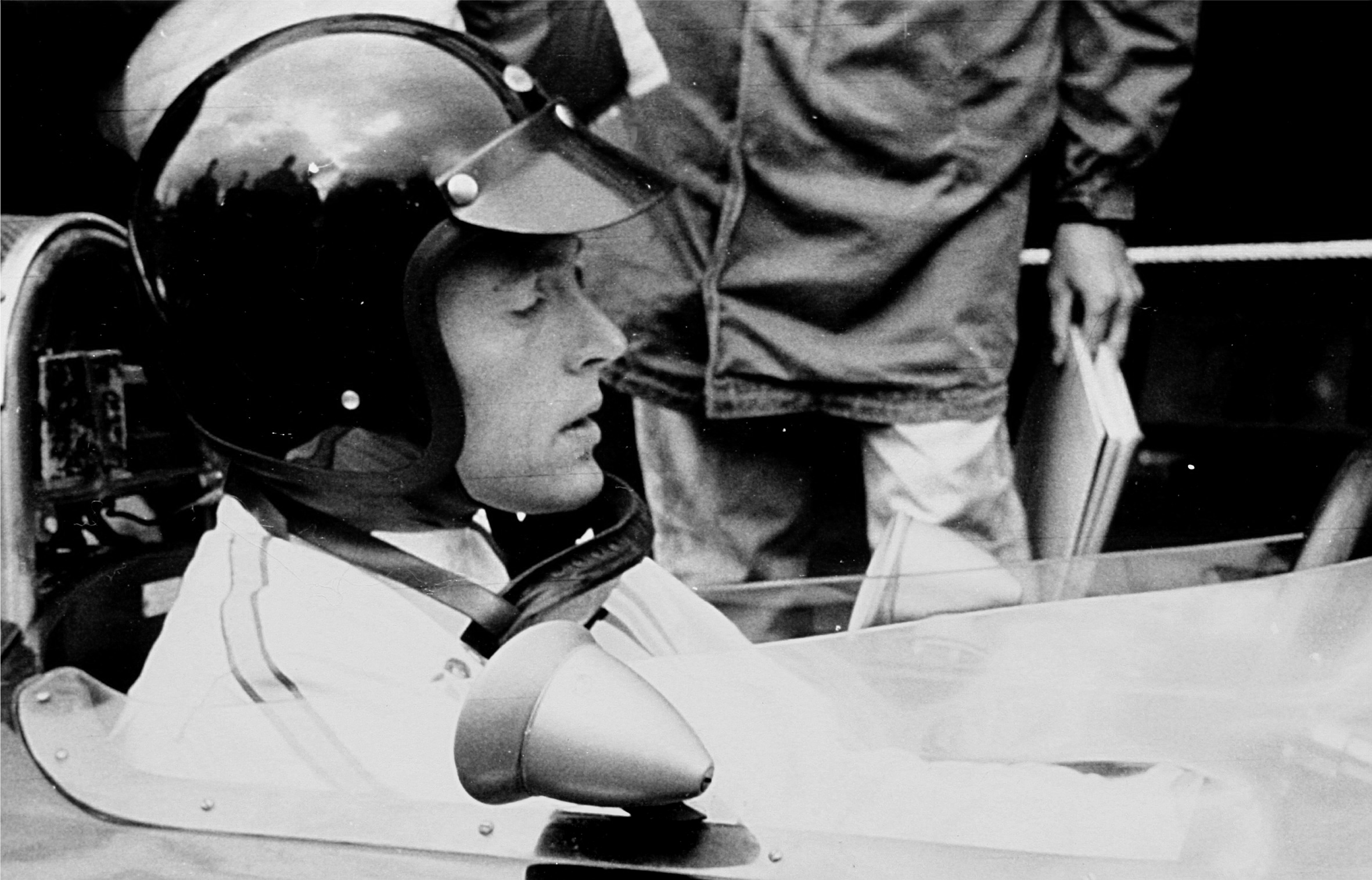
Dan Gurney wearing an open-face helmet in 1965

Helmets have been mandated for Formula One drivers since 1952. In the early decades, helmets were open-faced and provided minimal protection. At the 1968 German Grand Prix, Dan Gurney became the first driver to wear a full-face helmet in Formula One, which became normalised by the end of the decade and prompted the design of stronger helmets with increased facial protection. In 2011, Formula One required that a Zylon strip be placed onto driver helmets as a result of Felipe Massa's helmet being penetrated by debris during qualifying for the 2009 Hungarian Grand Prix. Modern Formula One helmets are composed of a carbon-fibre outer shell, an inner foam liner, and a fire-resistant Nomex liner. They have protective qualities against impacts, crushes, projectiles, penetration, and fire.

=== Head and neck support ===
Headrests, which were introduced in 1996, play a crucial role in preventing whiplash and generally decreasing the amount of strain on a driver's head and neck due to lateral g-forces. The HANS device was mandated in 2003, providing additional support for a driver's head and neck by tethering the helmet and seatbelt. Additionally, it reduces the risk of basilar skull fractures, which caused the death of Roland Ratzenberger at the 1994 San Marino Grand Prix.

=== Clothing ===
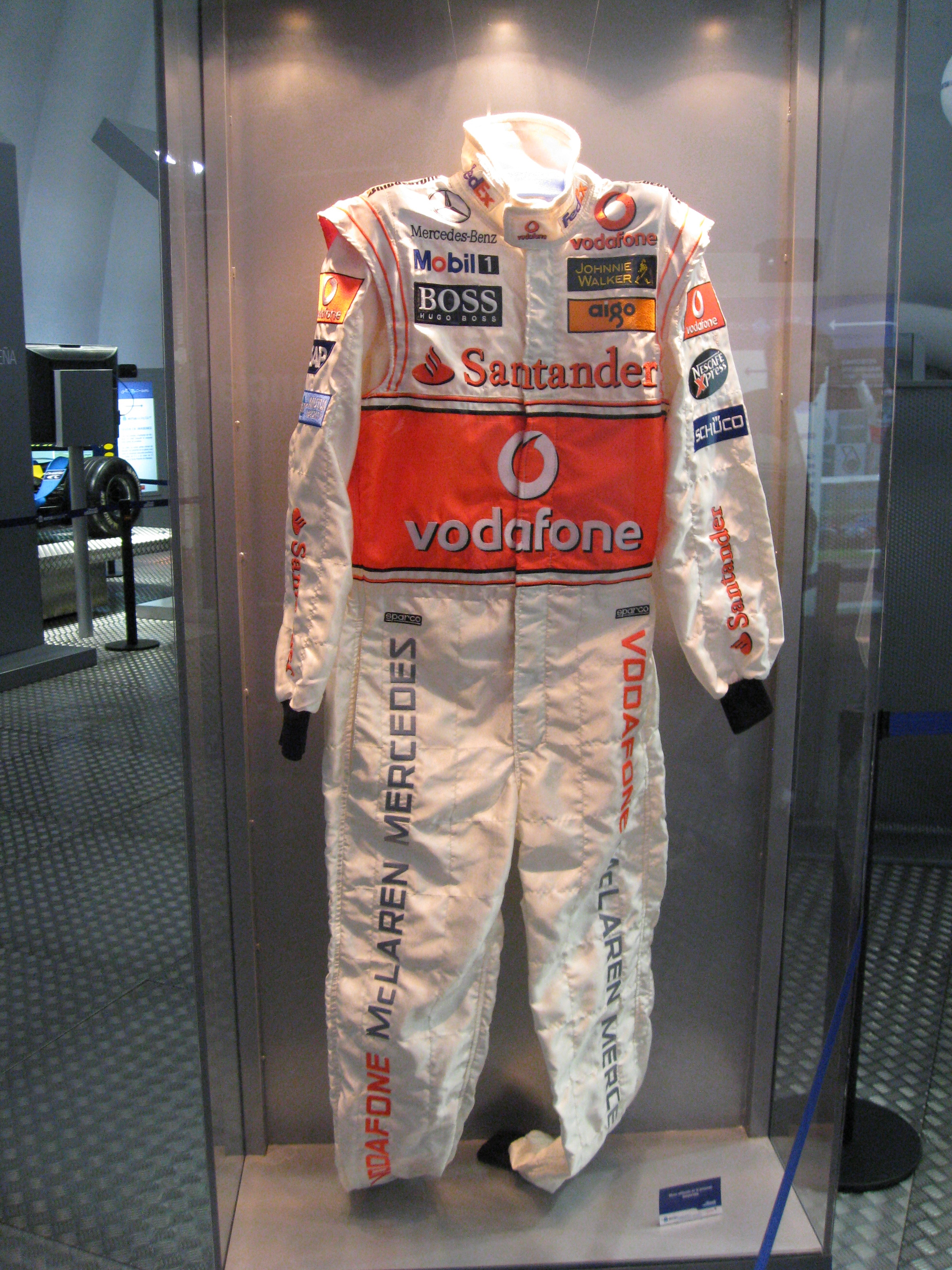
The racing suit of Fernando Alonso in 2007

Racing suits, also known as racesuits or overalls, became mandatory for drivers in 1963, and were required to meet fire resistance regulations for 1975 onwards. Racing suits incorporate Nomex to increase fire resistance and must resist flames for a 12-second test at 700 °C (1,292 °F).

Just like racing suits, Formula One drivers' gloves incorporate Nomex and must meet specific fire resistance standards. Gloves also record biometric data that provides information to medical teams about a driver's condition. Drivers also wear balaclavas, typically with only one hole for both eyes. Underwear consisting of a long sleeved shirt, "long johns", and socks—all of which are fire resistant with the use of Nomex—is required by the FIA. During the 2022 Australian Grand Prix, the rule regarding fire-resistant underwear made headlines following an unprecedented two-hour driver briefing by Niels Wittich, the Formula One race director.

=== Seatbelts ===
Six-point seat belts were mandated beginning in 1972, and have been required since then. According to Aston Martin and Mercedes, seat belts are constructed from kevlar and incorporate titanium buckles.

== Incident response ==
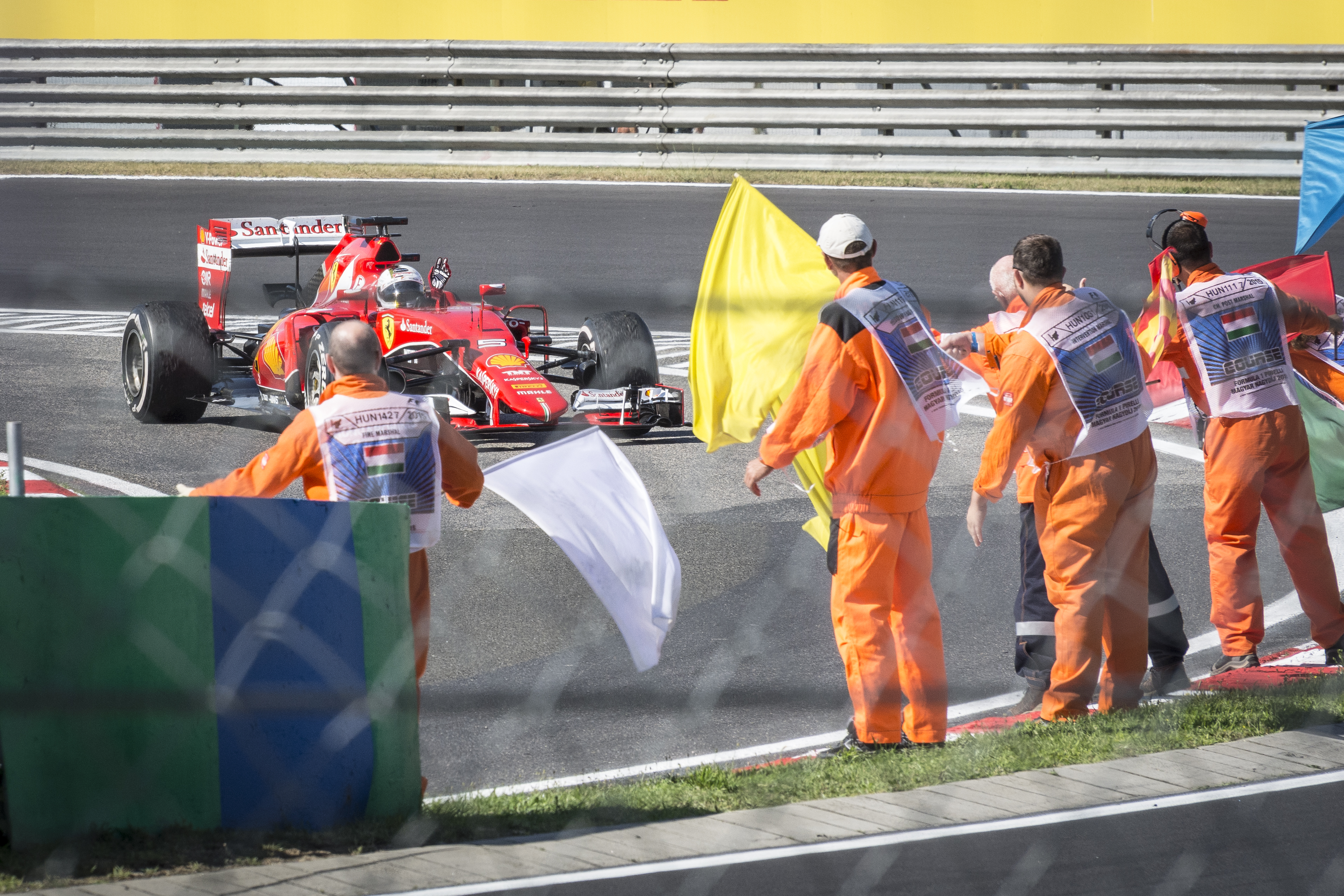
Marshals have a variety of flags to communicate messages to drivers

Present since the championship's creation, marshals play a major role in ensuring the safety of drivers, personnel, and spectators during a Grand Prix weekend. Their job includes removing debris from the track, assisting damaged or disabled cars, scrutineering, and displaying racing flags. Marshals report to race control, which is primarily responsible for coordinating responses to incidents and reporting any regulatory violations. Led by the race director, the team is primarily composed of officials from the FIA.

The safety car is a vehicle that can be deployed by the race director that sets a reduced speed for the competitors, typically following an incident that requires marshals enter the circuit—such as recovering a disabled or damaged vehicle. The first use of a safety car during a Grand Prix was at the 1973 Canadian Grand Prix, when a Porsche 914 driven by Eppie Wietzes was sent out to control cars following multiple incidents and bad weather. The safety car was formally introduced during the 1993 season and has been present since then. As a result of Jules Bianchi's eventually fatal accident at the 2014 Japanese Grand Prix, (Note: At the time that the virtual safety car was introduced, Bianchi had not yet died from his injuries.) the FIA introduced the virtual safety car (VSC) system for the 2015 season onwards. A VSC is responsible for slowing the pace when there is an incident on track, but without sending out a physical safety car.

=== Medical response ===
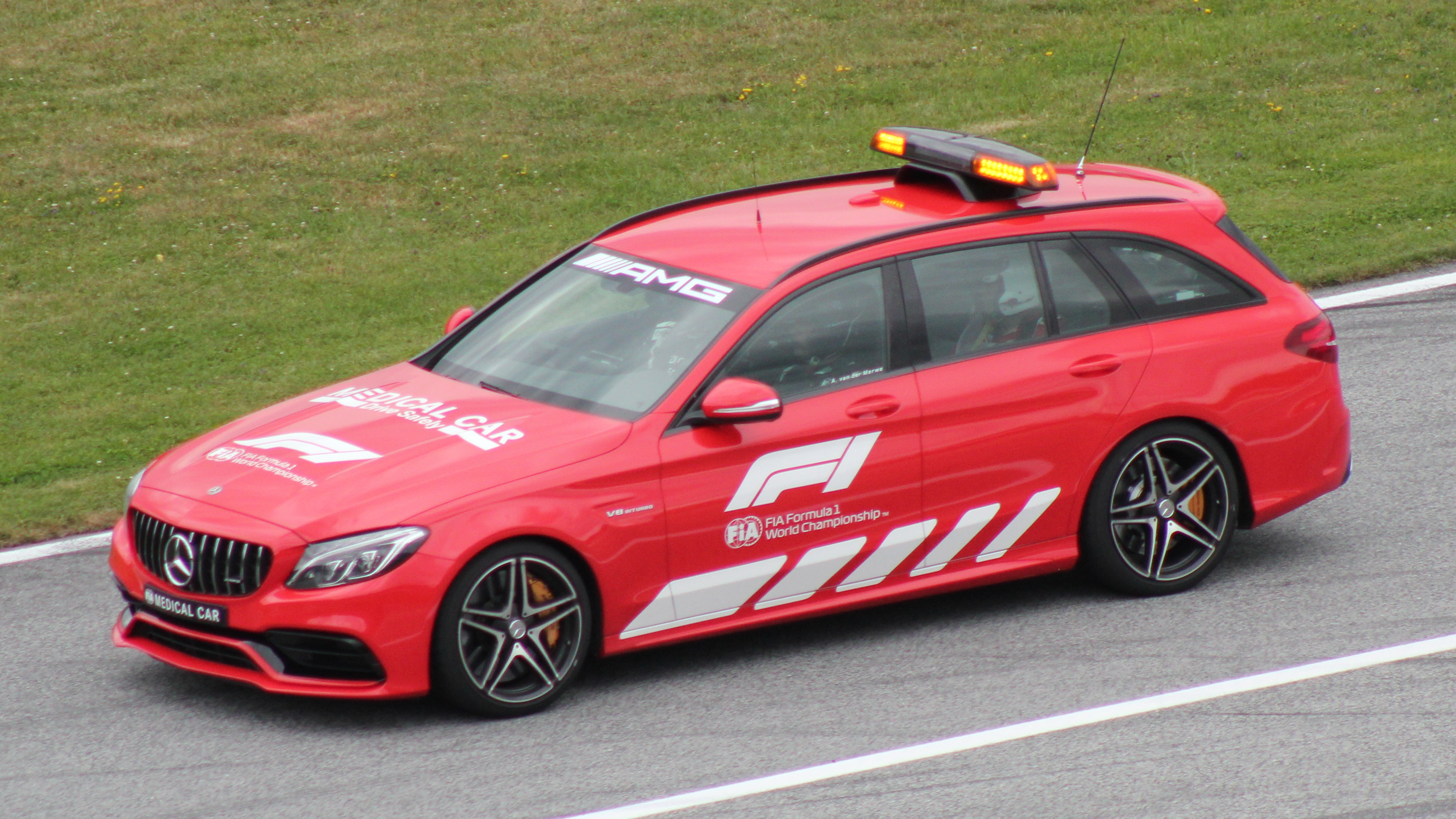
A Formula One medical car in 2021

Formula One's first full-time doctor was Sid Watkins, who was hired by Bernie Ecclestone—then serving as the chief executive of FOCA—in 1978. At the time, circuits had limited medical facilities. Watkins worked to improve medical centres and personnel. At the 2024 British Grand Prix, the medical staff consisted of 123 personnel, two trauma teams, specialised doctors, and radiology equipment; the 1996 edition reportedly hired 40 personnel. Watkins also advocated for a car staffed by a professional driver, an anesthesiologist, and himself. This concept, known as the medical car, was originally introduced at the 1972 French Grand Prix by Dr. Jean-Jacques Issermann. The medical car is equipped with an extensive amount of equipment, including supplies for resuscitation, trauma, and burns. Additionally, there are ambulances and extraction units positioned around a circuit to assist with medical response. Watkins was succeeded by his deputy, Gary Hartstein, as Formula One's Medical Delegate. As of the 2025 season, Ian Roberts serves as the FIA Medical Delegate for Formula One, with Bruno Correia and Karl Reindler sharing the responsibility of driving the medical car.

== Circuit layout ==
Over time, the design of racing circuits has changed to ensure safety and minimise the impact of crashes. Barriers are a crucial part of this, keeping both the spectators and drivers safe if a car exits the track. Barriers have been greatly improved over time, originally being made out of concrete and hay bales, with the latter being banned as a result of Lorenzo Bandini's crash at the 1967 Monaco Grand Prix. In modern circuits, tyre walls, armco barriers, Tecpro barriers, catch fences, and occasionally SAFER barriers are installed to absorb and disperse collision energy, helping reduce the deceleration force on the driver during the impact.

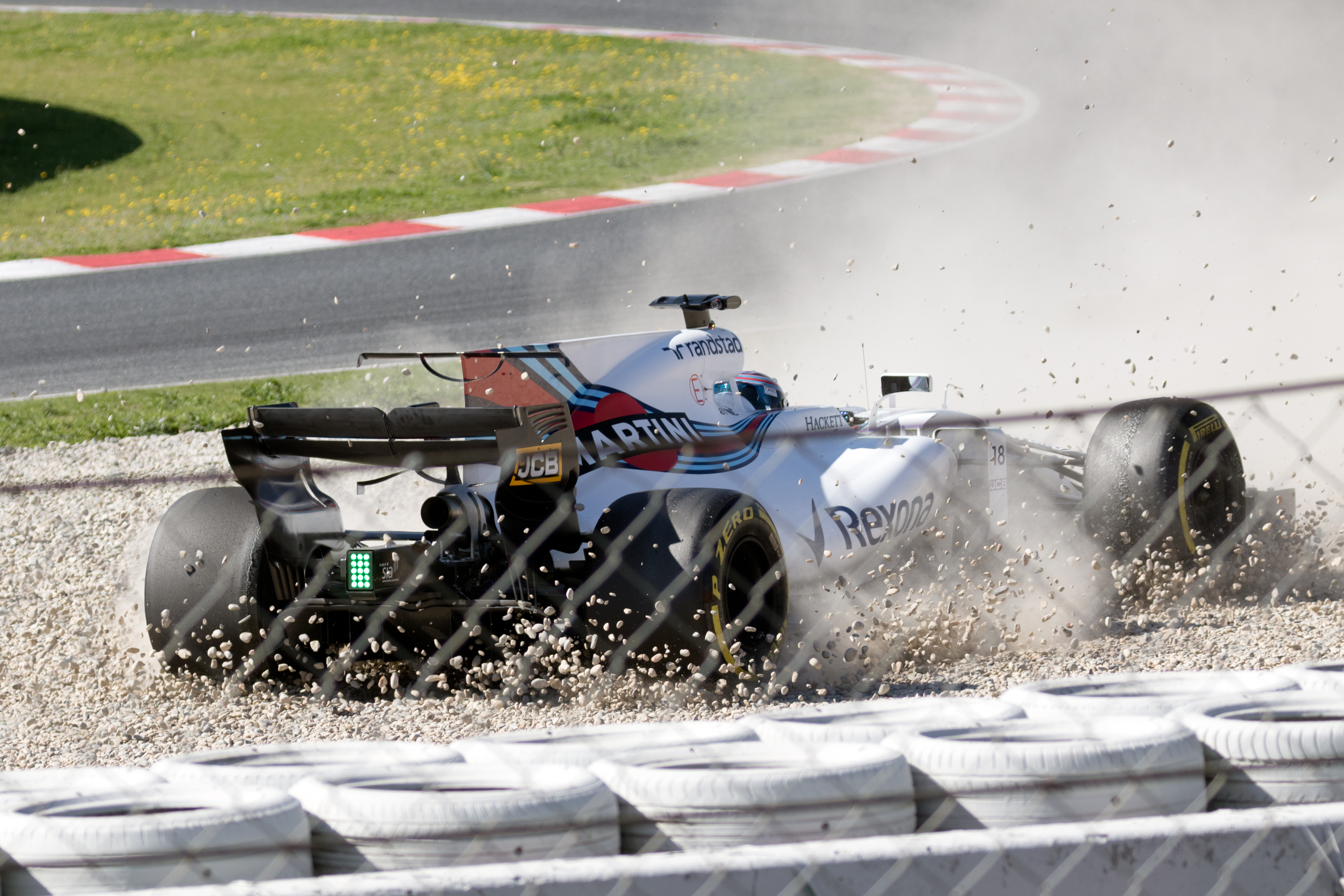
A Formula One car in a gravel trap

Gravel traps are a form of run-off area that help slow down an out-of-control car in the event that it exits the track. For this reason, gravel traps are most commonly placed near straights and high-speed corners. However, as speed increased with technical innovation, gravel traps became less effective at slowing down cars; an example of this was Michael Schumacher's crash at the 1999 British Grand Prix. Run-off areas composed of asphalt and tarmac are also commonly used as it is easier for drivers to rejoin the track, providing more traction.

Following the death of Ayrton Senna, Formula One and the FIA took action to eliminate high-risk corners. Chicanes were temporarily added to Tamburello at Imola and the Eau Rouge / Raidillon complex at Spa-Francorchamps. The latter has a long history of safety concerns and changes since its opening in 1921. At the 1960 Belgian Grand Prix, Chris Bristow and Alan Stacey were both killed. The scheduled race in 1969 was cancelled due to boycotts over the circuit's layout and safety, primarily led by Jackie Stewart. The race was held in 1970, but was not held again after that until 1983. Multiple changes have occurred to the layout of Eau Rouge and Raidillon since the circuit's return to the Formula One calendar. Anthoine Hubert and Dilano van 't Hoff were both killed near the complex while racing in FIA Formula 2 and Formula Regional European, while Lando Norris's aquaplaning during the 2021 Belgian Grand Prix all caused backlash and prompted alterations to the layout.

The FIA provides grade rankings for racing circuits across the world, on a scale of one to six. In order to host a Formula One race, a circuit must be "Grade One", showing compliance with various regulations involving safety, quality of facilities, accessibility, and more.

== Refuelling ==
Refuelling during Formula One races was formally introduced to pit stops during the 1982 season by Brabham, and was banned two years later for the 1984 season due to safety concerns. After a decade, refuelling was reintroduced in 1994 and banned once again prior to the 2010 season, as a result of continued safety concerns and efforts to cut equipment costs for teams. Notable incidents relating to refuelling during races include Heikki Kovalainen and Kimi Räikkönen at the 2009 Brazilian Grand Prix, as well as Jos Verstappen at the 1994 German Grand Prix.

== Notable organisations and figures ==
The Grand Prix Drivers' Association (GPDA) serves as the trade union for Formula One drivers, first being established in 1961 and reformed in 1994 following the deaths of Ayrton Senna and Roland Ratzenberger. The organisation helps advocate for safer regulations on behalf of the drivers.

Many individuals have helped contribute to safety improvements in Formula One, with some notable examples being: Jean-Marie Balestre, former FIA President; Max Mosley, former FIA President; Jackie Stewart, three-time World Drivers' Champion; and Sid Watkins, former Formula One Medical Delegate.

== See also ==
- History of Formula One
- Safety in NASCAR
