= McLaren MP4-X =

Concept car

- Category: Formula One Concept Car
- Constructor: McLaren
- Successor: McLaren X2

Technical specifications
- Engine: Honda
- Fuel: Mobil 1
- Tyres: Pirelli P Zero tyres

Competition history

The McLaren MP4-X is a concept car produced by the McLaren Formula 1 team in 2015. Following 2018's Formula 1 regulation changes, including the introduction of the halo, the concept was revisited as the McLaren X2.

== Features ==
Some of the (intended, but not designed) features of the MP4-X include:

- A morphing chassis, which can return to its original shape after an impact.
- An augmented cockpit, where the driver has a 360-degree view of their surroundings.
- Brain-controlled vehicle systems, where the driver's brain patterns operate the vehicle systems.
- Real-time tire pressure analysis, where the car can predict when tires will blow out.
- Driver biotelemetry, where the sensors in the driver's suit send live biological information to emergency crews in the event of a crash.
- Active aerodynamics, where electronics control the attack angle of the wings.
- A ground effect design, where the aerodynamics, especially the downforce, are used to suck the car to the ground.
- An enclosed wheel design, where the wheels are fully enclosed and have wear sensors to detect when they are getting worn.
- Alternative power sources, where the car can harness solar and inductive coupling built into the track.
