= Sid Watkins =

English neurosurgeon and Formula One doctor (1928–2012)

Sid Watkins OBE FRCS
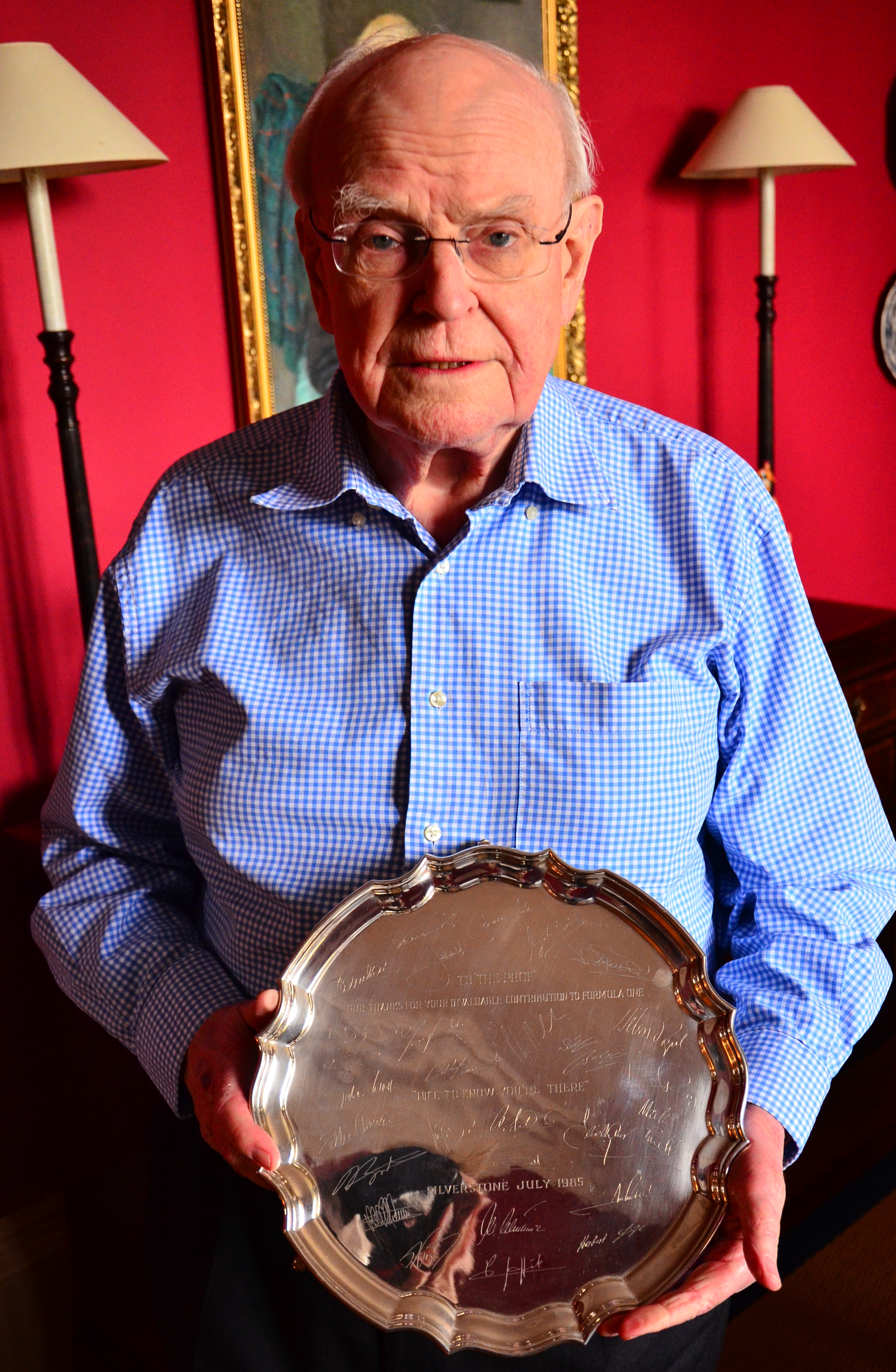
- Watkins in 2012
- Born: Eric Sidney Watkins; 6 September 1928; Liverpool, England
- Died: 12 September 2012 (aged 84); London, England
- Education: University of Liverpool (MD)
- Years active: 1978–2004
- Employer: FIA
- Title: President of the FIA Institute for Motor Sport Safety; Formula One Safety and Medical Delegate
- Successor: Gary Hartstein
- Children: 4

Eric Sidney Watkins (6 September 1928 – 12 September 2012), also known as Professor Sid or simply Prof, was an English neurosurgeon. From 1978 to 2004, Watkins served as Safety and Medical Delegate in Formula One.

Born and raised in Liverpool, Watkins enrolled at the University of Liverpool where he graduated as a Doctor of Medicine in 1952. He then served four years in the Royal Army Medical Corps before specialising in neurosurgery in Oxford and later, in London. Watkins also acted as a race track doctor at weekends which he continued at Watkins Glen International when he was appointed a Professor of Neurosurgery at State University of New York Upstate Medical University in Syracuse.

At a meeting with Brabham team boss Bernie Ecclestone, he was offered the role as the FIA Formula One Safety and Medical Delegate, head of the Formula One on-track medical team, and first responder in case of a crash, a role which Watkins performed for 26 years. He is credited with helping save the lives of many drivers, including: Gerhard Berger, Martin Donnelly, Érik Comas, Rubens Barrichello, Karl Wendlinger, and Mika Häkkinen.

== Early life ==
Eric Sidney Watkins was born on 6 September 1928 in Liverpool to Wallace and Jessica Watkins. Wallace was originally a coal miner from Gloucestershire, but had moved to Liverpool during the Great Depression of the 1930s where he started a small business initially repairing bicycles before progressing to motor vehicle repairs. Watkins worked for his father at the garage until he was 25. He had two brothers and a sister. Watkins gained a scholarship at Prescot Grammar School. He told his father that he wanted to become a doctor, an idea of which his father disapproved.

Watkins graduated as a Doctor of Medicine from the University of Liverpool in 1956; during his time there he carried out research on the effects of heat stress on performance, finding that increased heat greatly affected intellectual performance. This research would later prove useful as part of his work in motor racing. Following graduation, he served with the Royal Army Medical Corps in West Africa for four years. There he competed in his only motorsport event, driving a Ford Zephyr Zodiac in the 1955 West African Rally, retiring from the event after the first stage. He returned to the UK in 1958 to specialise in neurosurgery at the Radcliffe Infirmary, Oxford, and it was in 1961 when he took up his first motorsport event in a medical capacity at a kart race at the Brands Hatch circuit. During his free time he acted as race doctor at the Silverstone Circuit.

Upon receiving an offer to be a professor of neurosurgery at the State University of New York in 1962, Watkins moved to Syracuse, New York, and continued his interest in motorsport at the Watkins Glen circuit. Watkins took four members to the circuit and his own medical equipment due to the lack of supplies provided by circuit officials. He returned to England in 1970 to act as head of neurosurgery at the London Hospital, and was invited to join the RAC medical panel the same year.

== Formula One ==
=== 1970s ===
In 1978, Watkins met Bernie Ecclestone, at the time chief executive of the Formula One Constructors Association, who offered Watkins the position of official Formula One race doctor. Ecclestone had checked in for a medical problem and offered Watkins $35,000 a year for the entire season. Watkins had to pay airfares, hotel bills, rental cars and all incidental expenses. Watkins accepted, and attended his first race at the 1978 Swedish Grand Prix. Outside of the Grand Prix weekends, he remained in his position as a neurosurgeon in London. His first day as the Safety and Medical Delegate, was at Brands Hatch to introduce himself to the drivers. Watkins did not attend private test day sessions due to the large number of sessions held over the course of the year.

Initially, his appointment was met with hostility by some of the racing circuits, who saw his appointment as a way of monitoring their performance. At the time, medical facilities would sometimes consist of nothing more than a tent. At the 1978 Italian Grand Prix, Ronnie Peterson crashed heavily on the first lap, with the car catching fire. Fellow drivers Clay Regazzoni, Patrick Depailler and James Hunt pulled him from the wreckage but by the time Watkins arrived at the scene, Italian police had formed a human wall to prevent people from entering the area. Watkins was initially stopped from assisting with the treatment and there was a long delay of approximately 18 minutes before an ambulance arrived to take Peterson to hospital, where he died the following day. Following the race, Watkins demanded that Ecclestone provide better safety equipment, an anaesthetist, a medical car and a medical helicopter (Medevac). All were provided at the next race in the United States. In addition, it was decided that the medical car containing Watkins would follow the racing cars for the first lap of the race to provide immediate help in the event of a first lap incident. The organisers at Hockenheim had denied Watkins access to race control and Ecclestone threatened to stand in front of the grid and order the drivers out of their cars.

=== 1980s ===
1981 saw FISA, motorsport's governing body at the time, appoint a Medical Commission, with Watkins elected president. In 1982, at the Belgian Grand Prix, Watkins went with the medical car driven by Roland Bruynseraede as it headed to the scene of Gilles Villeneuve's serious accident and placed a tube into his windpipe for ventilation with his heart in normal condition. Villeneuve was airlifted by helicopter to the Gasthuisberg Hospital in Leuven and Watkins spoke to Villeneuve's wife Joann who was in her home in Monaco when 1979 champion Jody Scheckter informed her of the news. Joann flew to Belgium along with Scheckter's wife Pam to speak with Watkins. Joann and Watkins both accepted the decision to turn off his respirator, and Villeneuve died.

At the Canadian Grand Prix later that year, Watkins had to deal with the fatal accident of Riccardo Paletti on the first lap of the race. Watkins got to Paletti's car 16 seconds after impact and opened the visor of the helmet to see his blown pupils. Then, before any medical attention could be received, Paletti's car caught fire due to the petrol tank having ruptured and ignited. Watkins had suitable clothing to prevent him from suffering serious burns but his hands were affected. After he extinguished the fire, he took off his gloves to put an airway into Paletti's throat but Watkins' boots had melted in the fire. At the British Grand Prix in 1985, Watkins received a silver trophy during the drivers briefing. The trophy reads; "To the Prof, our thanks for your invaluable contribution to Formula 1. Nice to know you're there". In 1986, Watkins had the responsibility for caring for Frank Williams who sustained spinal cord injuries in a car crash on a public road.

In 1987, Nelson Piquet crashed during practice at the San Marino Grand Prix, and was declared unfit to race by Watkins. Despite it being only the second race of the season, Piquet tried to persuade officials to allow him to compete knowing any lost points could lose him the championship (which he ultimately won). In response, Watkins threatened to resign if overruled. The officials opted to support Watkins, and Piquet sat out the race, later admitting that it was the correct decision.

=== 1990s ===
Watkins founded the Brain and Spine Foundation in 1992, a charity that aims to improve "the prevention, treatment and care of people affected by disorders of the brain and spine". He was a Patron of the foundation.

At the 1994 San Marino Grand Prix, Watkins had to attend to his close personal friend, three-time champion Ayrton Senna, following the accident which claimed his life. Watkins had concerns about Senna's mental state following two crashes earlier in the weekend that had injured Senna's countryman and protege Rubens Barrichello and killed Austrian Roland Ratzenberger, suggesting to him that the two leave the track, go fishing, and forget about the race. Early in the race, Senna hit a retaining wall at nearly 140 miles per hour and Watkins was the first to attend to the driver. He reported that based on what he ascertained on arriving at the scene, that there was no chance Senna could have been saved, due to the graveness of the head injury he had suffered. Watkins also said he noticed Senna sighed, and his whole body relaxed, and that, though he was not religious, he felt it was at that moment Senna's "spirit left his body". The FIA Expert Advisory Safety Committee was set up in 1994 following the race and Watkins was appointed as its chairman. Watkins was also responsible for setting up a rally research group and karting research group in 2003. The three groups were brought together in 2004 as the FIA Institute for Motor Sport Safety, with Watkins as president.

For the 1995 European Grand Prix, Rubens Barrichello and Max Papis failed their drug tests after the Saturday qualifying session when both tested positive for ephedrine. Watkins later argued that ephedrine had no effect on a driver's ability and that Formula One should not use exactly the same list as the International Olympic Committee (IOC) in any case. At the 1995 Australian Grand Prix, Mika Häkkinen crashed heavily during the Friday qualifying session at the Brewery Bend at high-speed due to a puncture having been sustained by one of his tyres. Häkkinen was immediately rendered unconscious but did not hit his head against the surrounding wall or cockpit. Two volunteer doctors, Jereme Cockings and Steve Lewis, arrived at the scene in 15 seconds and performed an emergency tracheotomy. Watkins arrived last and allowed the doctors to continue, restarting Häkkinen's heart twice.

Watkins was awarded the Mario Andretti Award for Medical Excellence in 1996.

=== 2000s ===
Watkins acted in the defence for David Vissenga in an inquiry into practices into services of the Alfred Hospital, Melbourne, where marshal Graham Beveridge died after being struck by a wheel from Jacques Villeneuve's car in the 2001 Australian Grand Prix. In 2002, Watkins was made an Officer of the Order of the British Empire for recognition of his work in improving the safety of Grand Prix racing.

The University of Liverpool presented him with an honorary doctorate at a ceremony in Liverpool on 8 July 2004. On 26 September 2004, Watkins along with Gary Hartstein were first on the scene when Peter Phillips and three other team members were travelling on the same stretch of road as Watkins and Hartstein when their van collided with another car at high speed. On 12 October 2004, Watkins became the first president of the FIA Foundation for the Automobile and Society, and in December of that year he became the first president of the FIA Institute for Motor Sport Safety, both created in honour of the FIA's hundredth anniversary.

== Retirement ==
After his retirement, the FIA recognised Watkins for being largely responsible for the modernisation of medical standards in Formula One. On 20 January 2005, Watkins announced his retirement from his various medical positions in the FIA, but stated his intention to continue as President of the FIA Institute for Motor Sport Safety. FIA President Max Mosley appointed Watkins's longtime deputy Gary Hartstein as his successor. Following his departure, Mosley remarked that "Professor Watkins has made a unique contribution to improving the standards of safety and medical intervention throughout motor sport." In September 2005, a campaign to knight Watkins was started by a group of supporters.

In July 2008, Watkins was honoured for the award of "Most Outstanding Contribution to the Motorsport Industry" with the award presented by Martin Brundle at the House of Lords. On 8 December 2011 it was announced that Watkins had stepped down as President of the FIA Institute, but would continue in an honorary role. The day after retiring, he received the FIA Academy Gold Medal for Motor Sport at the official FIA Gala prize-giving ceremony in Dubai.

Since 1998, each year the Motorsport Safety Fund organises the Watkins Lecture, which takes place at the Autosport International Show at the National Exhibition Centre in Birmingham. These lectures usually focus on motorsport safety related matters, and have been delivered by guest speakers such as Max Mosley and Ross Brawn. Watkins himself delivered the inaugural lecture and again in 2007.

Watkins wrote or co-authored a number of books on racing safety, including Life at the Limit: Triumph and Tragedy in Formula One.

== Personal life ==
Watkins had two sons, Sid and Alistair and two daughters, Jessica and Martha. He also shared two stepsons, Matthew and Antony with his third wife Susan, a biographer and historian. He had a passion for smoking cigars, drinking whisky, and fishing. His eldest son Sid, was a Consultant Paediatrician at Southampton General Hospital. His second son, Alistair is a former Media Delegate who worked for the FIA, Kirch Media and was the marketing director for British American Racing. His stepson, Antony, is a consultant neurosurgeon at the Queen Elizabeth Hospital and the Royal Hospital for Sick Children in Glasgow. Watkins also had nine grandchildren.

Unlike his friend, Ayrton Senna, who was a devout Catholic, Watkins was non-religious, a fact that he incidentally admitted when discussing the moment when Senna died, stating that:

He (Senna) looked serene. I raised his eyelids and it was clear from his pupils that he had a massive brain injury. We lifted him from the cockpit and laid him on the ground. As we did, he sighed and, although I am not religious, I felt his spirit depart at that moment.

== Death and legacy ==
Watkins died on 12 September 2012 at King Edward VII's Hospital in London. His family was at his bedside. Tributes to Watkins were paid by many drivers who have competed in Formula One and other figures within the sport. Watkins was buried in a private ceremony near the border of Scotland on 18 September. This was followed by a memorial service that was held at St Marylebone Parish Church in London on 18 January 2013. The service was attended by 200 people which included figures from within Formula One.

At the Singapore Grand Prix, a one-minute silence was held in his honour and a book of remembrance was available for people to sign their condolences during the weekend. This book was presented to the Watkins family on behalf of the FIA, FIA Institute and the Formula One community. In December 2012, Top Gear magazine named Sid one of "The Men of the Year 2012" for saving lives in Formula One. Richard Hammond said "He was a legend throughout motorsport, and he's still saving lives now he's gone".

A new building bearing Watkins' name was officially opened by Anne, Princess Royal at The Walton Centre NHS Foundation Trust in Fazakerley, Liverpool on 15 December 2015. Her Royal Highness unveiled a commemorative plaque and a bust of Watkins in honour of his contributions to both motorsport and neurosurgery.

== List of works ==
- Watkins, Sid (1996). Life at the Limit: Triumph and Tragedy in Formula One. Motorbooks Intl. ISBN 0-7603-0315-0.
- Watkins, Sid; Tremayne, David (2000). The Science of Safety: The Battle Against Unacceptable Risks in Motor Racing. Haynes Publications. ISBN 1-85960-664-4.
- Watkins, Sid; Stewart, Jackie (2002). Beyond the Limit. Pan Books. ISBN 0-330-48196-7.

== See also ==
- Grand Prix Drivers' Association
