= 2020 Bahrain Grand Prix =

2020 Formula One race at Bahrain International Circuit

Race 15 of 17 (Note: The outbreak of the COVID-19 pandemic saw several Grands Prix cancelled or rescheduled. The revised calendar consisted of seventeen races.) in the 2020 Formula One World Championship
← Previous race	Next race →

Race details
- Date: 29 November 2020
- Official name: Formula 1 Gulf Air Bahrain Grand Prix 2020
- Location: Bahrain International Circuit, Sakhir, Bahrain
- Course: Permanent racing facility
- Course length: 5.412 km (3.363 miles)
- Distance: 57 laps, 308.238 km (191.530 miles)
- Weather: Clear
- Attendance: 0 (Note: The Grand Prix was held behind closed doors due to the COVID-19 pandemic in Bahrain.)

Pole position
Driver	(United Kingdom) Lewis Hamilton	Mercedes
- Time: 1:27.264

Fastest lap
Driver	(Netherlands) Max Verstappen	Red Bull Racing-Honda
- Time: 1:32.014 on lap 48

Podium
First	(United Kingdom) Lewis Hamilton	Mercedes
Second	(Netherlands) Max Verstappen	Red Bull Racing-Honda
Third	(Thailand) Alexander Albon	Red Bull Racing-Honda

The 2020 Bahrain Grand Prix (officially known as the Formula 1 Gulf Air Bahrain Grand Prix 2020) was a Formula One motor race that took place over 57 laps on 29 November 2020 on the 'Grand Prix Circuit' configuration at the Bahrain International Circuit in Sakhir, Bahrain. The race was the fifteenth round of the 2020 Formula One World Championship. It was the sixteenth time that the Bahrain Grand Prix has been run as a round of the Formula One World Championship.

This race was the first of two back to back Formula One races scheduled to be held in Bahrain. The second race, named the Sakhir Grand Prix, took place at the same venue on 6 December, but was held on a different circuit layout.

The race was suspended for eighty minutes following a serious accident involving Romain Grosjean, which resulted in his Haas VF-20 splitting in two and catching fire. Grosjean escaped with second degree burns on his hands. Grosjean did not participate in the final two races of the season due to his injuries and left Formula One for the IndyCar Series at the end of the season, making this race his last in Formula One. Mercedes driver Lewis Hamilton won the race from pole position ahead of Red Bull Racing teammates Max Verstappen and Alexander Albon. The race was the last of the season to be won by a Mercedes driver; the final two races at Sakhir and Abu Dhabi were won by Sergio Pérez and Max Verstappen, respectively.

== Background ==
=== Impact of the COVID-19 pandemic ===
The race was originally due to take place on 22 March 2020 as the second round of the championship, but the COVID-19 pandemic led to event organisers initially announcing that no spectators would be permitted to attend the race. On 13 March 2020 the race was indefinitely postponed. It was the second time in Formula One history that the Bahrain Grand Prix was postponed after the 2011 Bahrain Grand Prix, which was ultimately cancelled. In its place, an online virtual Grand Prix was held on the original race date featuring racing drivers, celebrities, and e-sport racers. The virtual race was won by Formula Two driver Guanyu Zhou. In August, the Bahrain Grand Prix was rescheduled to 29 November. Due to a surge of COVID-19 cases in the country, organisers announced that the Grand Prix would take place behind closed doors. Local authorities gave special dispensation to allow local health workers to attend with their families.

=== Entrants ===
The drivers and teams were the same as the season entry list with no additional stand-in drivers for the race. Roy Nissany drove for Williams in the first practice session, replacing George Russell, while Robert Kubica drove for Alfa Romeo Racing, in place of Kimi Räikkönen.

=== Tyres ===
Sole Formula One tyre manufacturer Pirelli brought their C2, C3 and C4 compound tyres (the middle range of hardness) for teams to use in dry weather conditions. Pirelli also tested the 2021 tyre compounds during the first 30 minutes of both of Friday's two practice sessions. Drivers, particularly Lewis Hamilton, were ultimately unimpressed with the prototype tyres in practice.

== Practice ==
The first of two practice sessions took place on Friday in unrepresentative daylight conditions and saw Hamilton top the timesheet from Mercedes teammate Valtteri Bottas and Racing Point driver Sergio Pérez.

Hamilton also topped the second session, with Max Verstappen of Red Bull Racing in second and Bottas third. The second session was red flagged twice, the first time being for a crash of Alex Albon coming out of the final corner, from which the Red Bull driver emerged unharmed. The second red flag was for a stray dog that had wandered onto the track. The dog exited the racetrack unharmed, managing to escape through a gap in the marshal posts. Albon was given a new chassis for the rest of the event following his crash in the session.

Verstappen was quickest in the third practice session on Saturday, ahead of Hamilton and Bottas.

== Qualifying ==
The second stage of qualifying was red flagged after Carlos Sainz Jr. experienced a brake failure and stopped on track.

=== Qualifying classification ===
Pos.	No.	Driver	Constructor	Qualifying times			Final grid
Pos.	No.	Driver	Constructor	Q1	Q2	Q3	Final grid
1	44	(United Kingdom) Lewis Hamilton	Mercedes	1:28.343	1:27.586	1:27.264	1
2	77	(Finland) Valtteri Bottas	Mercedes	1:28.767	1:28.063	1:27.553	2
3	33	(Netherlands) Max Verstappen	Red Bull Racing-Honda	1:28.885	1:28.025	1:27.678	3
4	23	(Thailand) Alexander Albon	Red Bull Racing-Honda	1:28.732	1:28.749	1:28.274	4
5	11	(Mexico) Sergio Pérez	Racing Point-BWT Mercedes	1:29.178	1:28.894	1:28.322	5
6	3	(Australia) Daniel Ricciardo	Renault	1:29.005	1:28.648	1:28.417	6
7	31	(France) Esteban Ocon	Renault	1:29.203	1:28.937	1:28.419	7
8	10	(France) Pierre Gasly	AlphaTauri-Honda	1:28.971	1:29.008	1:28.448	8
9	4	(United Kingdom) Lando Norris	McLaren-Renault	1:29.464	1:28.877	1:28.542	9
10	26	(Russia) Daniil Kvyat	AlphaTauri-Honda	1:29.158	1:28.944	1:28.618	10
11	5	(Germany) Sebastian Vettel	Ferrari	1:29.142	1:29.149	N/A	11
12	16	(Monaco) Charles Leclerc	Ferrari	1:29.137	1:29.165	N/A	12
13	18	(Canada) Lance Stroll	Racing Point-BWT Mercedes	1:28.679	1:29.557	N/A	13
14	63	(United Kingdom) George Russell	Williams-Mercedes	1:29.294	1:31.218	N/A	14
15	55	(Spain) Carlos Sainz Jr.	McLaren-Renault	1:28.975	No time	N/A	15
16	99	(Italy) Antonio Giovinazzi	Alfa Romeo Racing-Ferrari	1:29.491	N/A	N/A	16
17	7	(Finland) Kimi Räikkönen	Alfa Romeo Racing-Ferrari	1:29.810	N/A	N/A	17
18	20	(Denmark) Kevin Magnussen	Haas-Ferrari	1:30.111	N/A	N/A	18
19	8	(France) Romain Grosjean	Haas-Ferrari	1:30.138	N/A	N/A	19
20	6	(Canada) Nicholas Latifi	Williams-Mercedes	1:30.182	N/A	N/A	20
107% time: 1:34.527

== Race ==
=== Race report ===
==== First lap and Romain Grosjean's crash ====
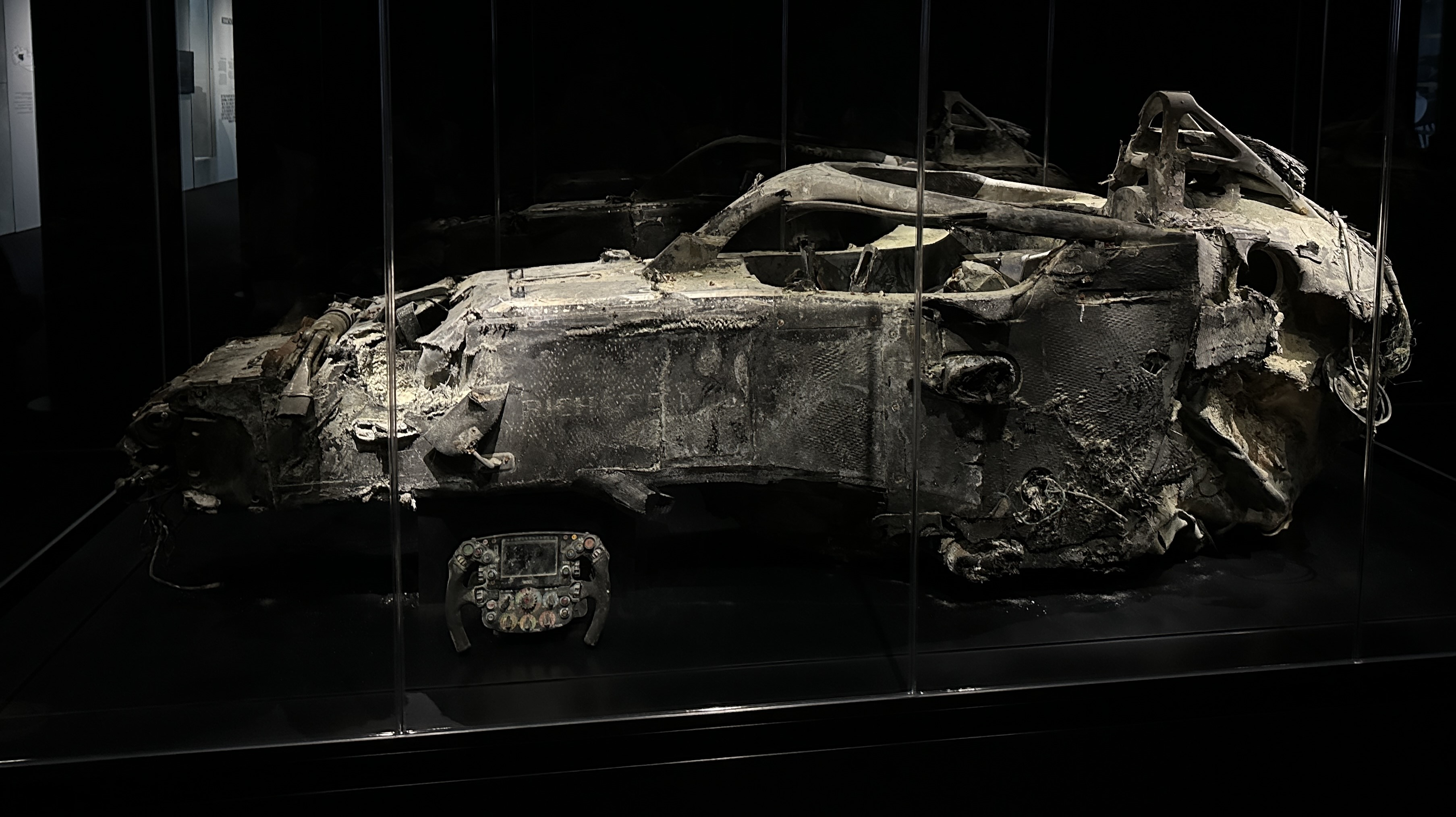
The front half of the wreckage of Grosjean's car, on display in 2023.

The 57-lap race started at the scheduled time of 17:10 local time (UTC+03:00). On the first lap, Haas driver Romain Grosjean clipped the AlphaTauri AT01 of Daniil Kvyat on the straight after turn 3, causing Grosjean's car to ricochet into the trackside crash barrier. Grosjean impacted the barrier travelling at 192 km/h (119 mph) with an estimated force of 67 g (660 m/s^{2}; 2,200 ft/s^{2}).

The impact and angle of the collision caused Grosjean's car to split in half, wedging the front half of the vehicle (including the driver's survival cell) into the crash barrier and tearing off the rear half of the vehicle from the rest of the car, igniting the car immediately upon impact. A subsequent investigation by the FIA concluded the fuel tank's inspection hatch was "dislodged" and the fuel supply connection was ripped from the tank, allowing significant amounts of fuel to escape the tank. As the force of the collision caused the crash barrier to split, the front half of the car was able to penetrate and slip through, which in the process caused the driver's compartment to impact the upper section of the split barrier. The halo device of the driver's compartment was thus credited for saving Grosjean from more serious injuries, and possible death, by sheltering his head and body from this impact with the barrier. Speaking from his hospital bed, Grosjean said the halo was "the greatest thing that we brought to Formula One, and without it, I wouldn't be able to speak to you today".

The wedging of the front of the car into the barrier hindered and delayed Grosjean's ability to climb out of the vehicle; the top half of the barrier which the car had slid through and came to rest under blocked Grosjean from being able to directly lift himself out. Grosjean endured the flames of the wreckage for approximately 28 seconds, while climbing around the barrier to extract himself from the vehicle unaided. Medical car driver Alan van der Merwe and medical delegate Dr. Ian Roberts provided treatment immediately and initially reported that Grosjean seemed to have suffered minor burns on his hands and ankles (where gaps exist between the race suit and the driver's gloves and boots) and a possible broken rib. It was later confirmed Grosjean suffered second-degree burns on his hands and no broken bones. Roberts reported Grosjean's helmet appeared to have been effective in preventing him from inhaling any smoke from the fire.

The crash led to the race being suspended for 80 minutes as debris was cleared and the destroyed metal barrier was replaced with a line of concrete blocks. Grosjean was taken to the track's medical centre, then to Bahrain Defence Force Hospital by helicopter for further treatment. Grosjean was discharged from hospital on the Wednesday morning after his crash.

When TV footage showing Grosjean sitting in the Medical Car was shown, the remaining 19 drivers and all 10 teams gave a round of applause in the pit lane as Grosjean was able to escape the car. Some outlets called the race "the miracle in the desert" due to Grosjean's escape from the crash.

Formula One managing director Ross Brawn said the crash would be investigated, and credited the halo cockpit protection device with protecting Grosjean. The most recent two crashes involving spearing a crash barrier in this way were in the 1973 and 1974 United States Grands Prix, where François Cevert and Helmut Koinigg respectively were killed. The most recent similar crash involving a fuel fire prior to this occurred when Gerhard Berger crashed at the 1989 San Marino Grand Prix.

==== Restarted race ====
Following the barrier repairs, the race restarted at 18:35 local time (UTC+03:00) on the third lap. Drivers restarted in the order they had crossed the second safety car line on lap one. Immediately following the restart, Kvyat and Racing Point driver Lance Stroll collided at turn eight. Stroll's car was flipped upside down but he was not injured in the crash. Kvyat was able to continue but was issued a 10-second time penalty, sending him down the order. Stroll's flipped car brought out a safety car, during which Bottas's car developed a puncture, forcing him to pit for new tyres. The safety car period concluded on the ninth lap, with Hamilton pulling clear of the rest of the field soon after. Hamilton committed to a two-stop strategy on the nineteenth lap, while Verstappen and Pérez behind changed to hard tyres for a one-stop strategy.

On lap 54, while running in third position, Pérez's Racing Point's engine failed and caught fire after turn 10, triggering a double-yellow caution in that zone of the track. As Lando Norris passed the scene, a track marshal, without permission from race control, crossed the track in front of him, carrying a large fire extinguisher. Norris was able to avoid hitting the marshal. Norris later commented on the radio "He's the bravest guy I've ever seen". Race director Michael Masi, while confirming the marshal acted contrary to instructions, defended the marshal's "acting on instinct" in light of the Grosjean fire earlier in the race. Following this a safety car period began which would last for the remainder of the race.

Hamilton won the race, with Verstappen in second position. This was Hamilton's eleventh win of the 2020 season. Pérez's retirement allowed Albon to inherit the final podium position, becoming the first Asian driver to score more than one podium finish. The two McLaren drivers finished in fourth and fifth, allowing McLaren to move ahead of Racing Point into third in the Constructors' Championship standings. Pérez's retirement also led to him losing fourth place in the Drivers' Championship standings to Daniel Ricciardo, who finished the race in seventh place behind Pierre Gasly.

=== Post-race ===
Romain Grosjean released a video message after the race while in hospital. He attributed his survival of the crash to the halo device, a safety device which he had criticised in the past. Haas confirmed that Grosjean would remain overnight at the Bahrain Defence Force Hospital for treatment, and later confirmed Pietro Fittipaldi would stand in for Grosjean at the Sakhir Grand Prix. Daniel Ricciardo was highly critical of Formula One Management (FOM) choosing to broadcast repeated replays of the incident; FOM later responded to this criticism defending their decision to show the replays as did Haas team boss Guenther Steiner. Mercedes team boss Toto Wolff also defended the use of replays whilst additionally stating that had Grosjean's injuries proved to be more serious then he would have considered withdrawing his cars and drivers from the race. Sebastian Vettel, also a senior director of the Grand Prix Drivers Association, expressed concerns over the collapse of the guardrail involved in the crash; although the barrier is designed to deform and absorb energy from the impact in a crash. The Marshals, Dr. Ian Roberts and Alan van der Merwe were awarded the FIA President's medal for their bravery and exceptional reaction to Grosjean's crash. Grosjean attended the next race, the 2020 Sakhir Grand Prix, where he thanked his rescuers for saving his life.

==== Grosjean crash investigation ====
In March 2021 the FIA released findings from their investigation into Grosjean's accident. The report concluded that the fire had been caused by a separation of fuel supply connection from the safety bladder, but that all driver safety measures functioned as expected. The report recommended reviews of fuel cell, survival cell and steering column construction specifications, as well as power unit mounting, fire suppression systems, and the effectiveness of drivers' gloves and helmet visors. Further research into barrier, driver warning, and firefighting systems was also recommended.

The FIA's research project to improve the heat resistance of drivers' gloves resulted in four racewear suppliers trialling new gloves at the 2021 Turkish Grand Prix.

=== Race classification ===
Pos.	No.	Driver	Constructor	Laps	Time/Retired	Grid	Points
1	44	(United Kingdom) Lewis Hamilton	Mercedes	57	2:59:47.515	1	25
2	33	(Netherlands) Max Verstappen	Red Bull Racing-Honda	57	+1.254	3	19^{1}
3	23	(Thailand) Alexander Albon	Red Bull Racing-Honda	57	+8.005	4	15
4	4	(United Kingdom) Lando Norris	McLaren-Renault	57	+11.337	9	12
5	55	(Spain) Carlos Sainz Jr.	McLaren-Renault	57	+11.787	15	10
6	10	(France) Pierre Gasly	AlphaTauri-Honda	57	+11.942	8	8
7	3	(Australia) Daniel Ricciardo	Renault	57	+19.368	6	6
8	77	(Finland) Valtteri Bottas	Mercedes	57	+19.680	2	4
9	31	(France) Esteban Ocon	Renault	57	+22.803	7	2
10	16	(Monaco) Charles Leclerc	Ferrari	56	+1 lap	12	1
11	26	(Russia) Daniil Kvyat	AlphaTauri-Honda	56	+1 lap	10	
12	63	(United Kingdom) George Russell	Williams-Mercedes	56	+1 lap	14	
13	5	(Germany) Sebastian Vettel	Ferrari	56	+1 lap	11	
14	6	(Canada) Nicholas Latifi	Williams-Mercedes	56	+1 lap	20	
15	7	(Finland) Kimi Räikkönen	Alfa Romeo Racing-Ferrari	56	+1 lap	17	
16	99	(Italy) Antonio Giovinazzi	Alfa Romeo Racing-Ferrari	56	+1 lap	16	
17	20	(Denmark) Kevin Magnussen	Haas-Ferrari	56	+1 lap	18	
18^{2}	11	(Mexico) Sergio Pérez	Racing Point-BWT Mercedes	53	Power unit	5	
Ret	18	(Canada) Lance Stroll	Racing Point-BWT Mercedes	2	Collision	13	
Ret	8	(France) Romain Grosjean	Haas-Ferrari	0	Collision	19	
Fastest lap: (Netherlands) Max Verstappen (Red Bull Racing-Honda) – 1:32.014 (lap 48)

Notes

- ^1 – Includes one point for fastest lap.
- ^2 – Sergio Pérez did not finish, but was classified as he had completed more than 90% of the race distance.

== Championship standings after the race ==
Drivers' Championship standings

	Pos.	Driver	Points
	1	(United Kingdom) **Lewis Hamilton**	332
	2	(Finland) Valtteri Bottas	201
	3	(Netherlands) Max Verstappen	189
2	4	(Australia) Daniel Ricciardo	102
1	5	(Mexico) Sergio Pérez	100

Constructors' Championship standings

	Pos.	Constructor	Points
	1	(Germany) **Mercedes**	533
	2	(Austria) Red Bull Racing-Honda	274
1	3	(United Kingdom) McLaren-Renault	171
1	4	(United Kingdom) Racing Point-BWT Mercedes	154 (Note: Racing Point was deducted 15 points after a protest from Renault was upheld regarding the legality of their car.)
	5	(France) Renault	144

- Note: Only the top five positions are included for both sets of standings.
- **Bold text** indicates the 2020 World Champions.

== See also ==
- 2020 Sakhir Formula 2 round

== Notes ==
Previous race: 2020 Turkish Grand Prix	FIA Formula One World Championship; 2020 season	Next race: 2020 Sakhir Grand Prix
Previous race: 2019 Bahrain Grand Prix	Bahrain Grand Prix	Next race: 2021 Bahrain Grand Prix
