= Ian Roberts (physician) =

English physician and Formula One doctor (born 1962 or 1963)

Ian Roberts FRCA
- Born: 1962 or 1963 (age 63–64); Hinckley, Leicestershire, England
- Education: University of Leicester (MB ChB); Keele University (MMedSci); Nottingham Law School (PGDL); Royal College of Anaesthetists (FRCA, FFICM)
- Years active: 2013–present
- Employer: FIA
- Title: Formula One Medical Delegate

Ian Roberts (born 1962 or 1963) is an English physician and anaesthesiologist. Roberts serves as Medical Delegate in Formula One.

Roberts graduated from the University of Leicester as a Bachelor of Medicine in 1986. He then served as the chief medical officer for Silverstone Circuit and the British Grand Prix. In 2013, Roberts replaced Gary Hartstein, becoming Formula One's Medical Rescue Coordinator and later becoming the sport's Medical Delegate. He gained recognition after rescuing Romain Grosjean at the 2020 Bahrain Grand Prix, for which he was awarded the FIA President Award. He has responded to several further high-profile incidents.

== Early and personal life ==
Roberts was born in Hinckley, Leicestershire. As of 2025, he lives in Burton-upon-Trent, Staffordshire.

== Career ==
=== Early career ===
Roberts studied medicine at the University of Leicester from 1981 to 1986. He previously served as the chief medical officer for Silverstone Circuit and the British Grand Prix. He has a background in anaesthesiology, intensive care, and air medicine. In 1995, he became a Fellow of the Royal College of Anaesthetists. He became a consultant in 1998 upon further specialist practice in neuroanaesthesia and intensive care.

=== Formula One ===
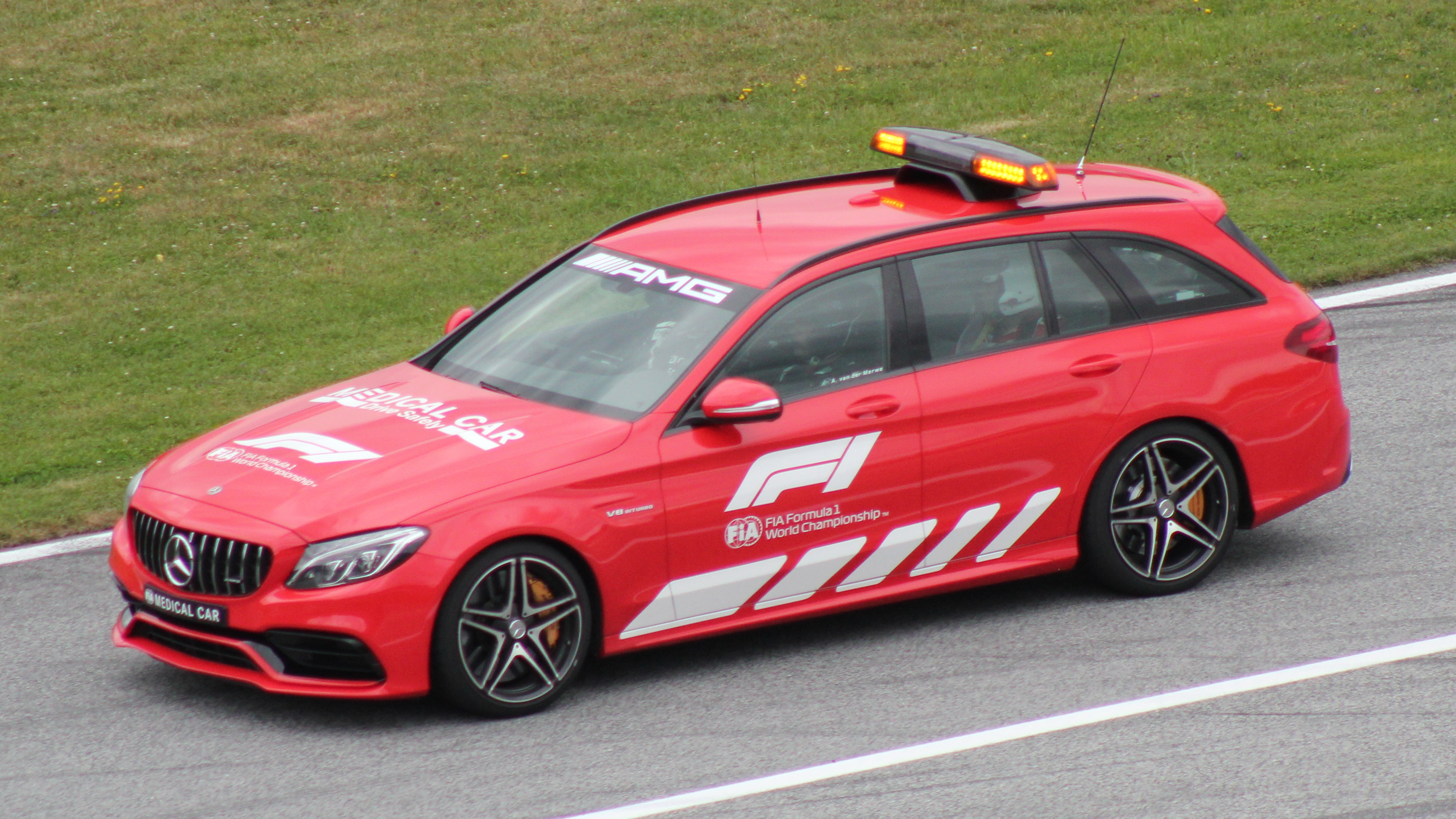
Roberts (pictured at the 2021 Austrian Grand Prix) replaced Gary Hartstein as the Formula One Medical Rescue Coordinator in 2013.

Following the departure of Gary Hartstein, Roberts was chosen by the FIA as the Medical Rescue Coordinator in Formula One for 2013 onwards, and later taking the position of Medical Delegate. He has been responsible for overseeing local medical personnel and assessing the track medical center, as well as serving as the primary physician in the medical car.

==== 2020 Bahrain Grand Prix ====
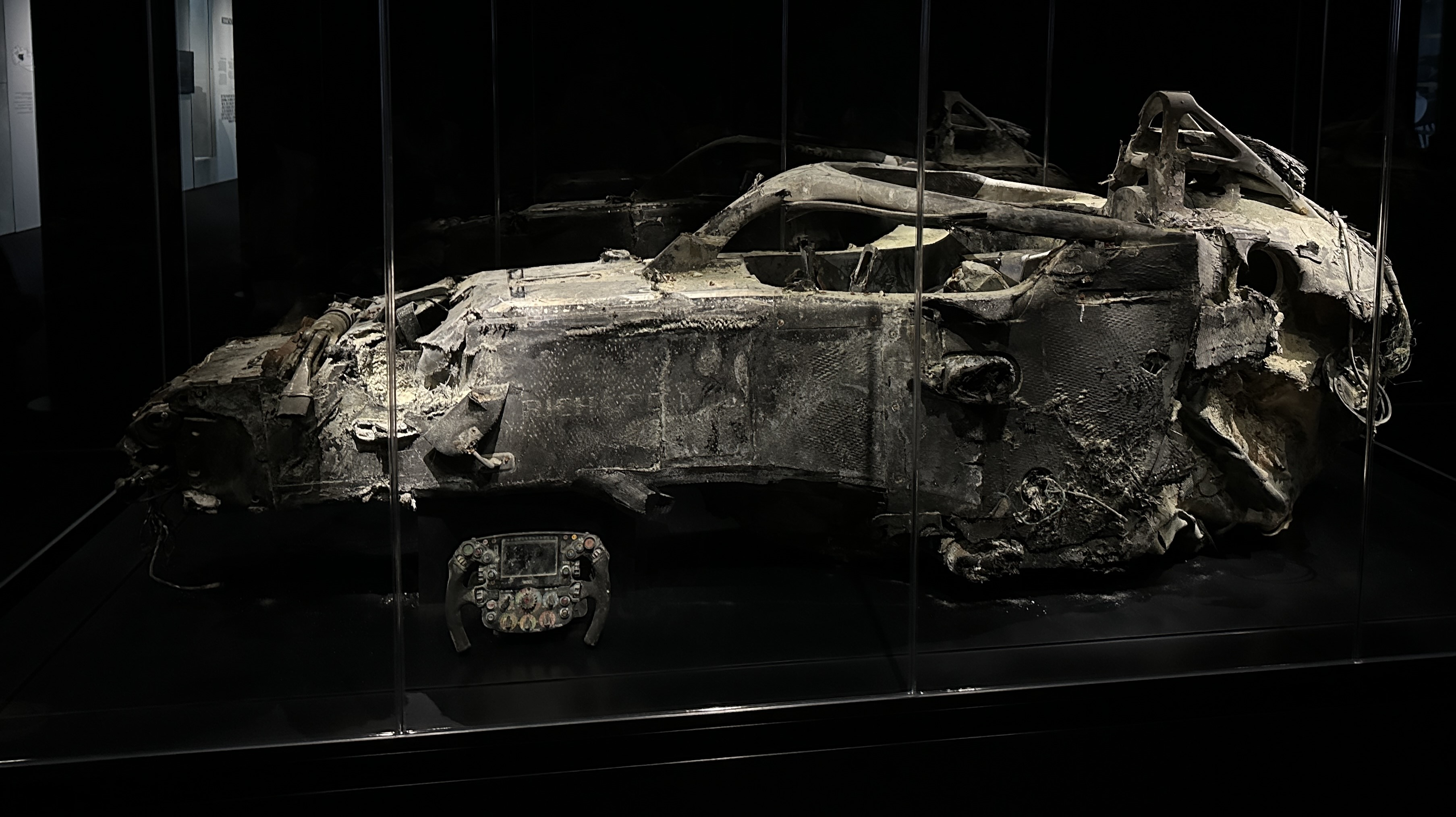
Roberts was awarded the FIA President Award after rescuing Romain Grosjean from his 2020 Bahrain Grand Prix wreck (pictured).

Roberts gained recognition following an incident involving Romain Grosjean during the 2020 Bahrain Grand Prix. On the opening lap of the race, Grosjean collided with a barrier, splitting his Haas VF-20 in half and setting it on fire after a 67 g (660 m/s^{2}; 2,200 ft/s^{2}) impact. Roberts, alongside medical car driver Alan van der Merwe, was commended for his work in rescuing Grosjean—who escaped with second-degree burns on his hands—by various media outlets. Roberts was awarded the FIA President Award for his actions by Jean Todt.

==== Notable incidents ====
Roberts has responded to two fatal incidents in his career:

- Jules Bianchi during the 2014 Japanese Grand Prix
- Anthoine Hubert during the 2019 Spa-Francorchamps Formula 2 round

Other notable incidents Roberts has responded to include:

- Max Verstappen during the 2021 British Grand Prix
- Zhou Guanyu during the 2022 British Grand Prix
- Lance Stroll during qualifying for the 2023 Singapore Grand Prix

== Awards and honours ==
- FIA President Award: 2020
- Innes Ireland Trophy (British Racing Drivers' Club)
- Prince Michael of Kent Award of Merit (Motorsport UK): 2022
