= Gary Hartstein =

American sports physician (born 1955)

- Born: 17 May 1955 (age 70)
- Occupations: Formula One: Medical Delegate (2005–2007); Medical Rescue Coordinator (2008–2012)
- Employer: Fédération Internationale de l'Automobile

Gary Hartstein (born 17 May 1955) is an American sports physician who served as the FIA Medical Delegate for Formula One between 2005 and 2007, later serving as the series' Medical Rescue Coordinator from 2008 until 2012.

== Career ==
Hartstein was born in Staten Island, New York. After finishing his undergraduate study at the University of Rochester, Hartstein to study medicine in Liège, Belgium during the late 1970s. In 1983, he returned to New York to undergo training in anaesthesiology and critical care medicine.

In 1989, Hartstein returned to Belgium and began working at Circuit de Spa-Francorchamps as part of the local medical team attending races. In 1990, Hartstein was assigned to the medical car containing Professor Sid Watkins for a Formula One race.

Hartstein became Watkins' full-time deputy in 1997 to assist with medical response during Formula One races. When Watkins retired at the end of the 2004 season, Hartstein was promoted to the role of FIA Medical Delegate for 2005 onwards. He continued in the role for 2006 and 2007, but was replaced by Jean-Charles Piette prior to the 2008 season. Hartstein was instead given the role of Medical Rescue Coordinator, which meant that he would still be the doctor responsible for being in the medical car and responding to incidents on track. At the end of the 2012 season, his contract was not renewed by the FIA, being replaced by Ian Roberts.
