= Halo (safety device) =

Safety device in open-wheel racing

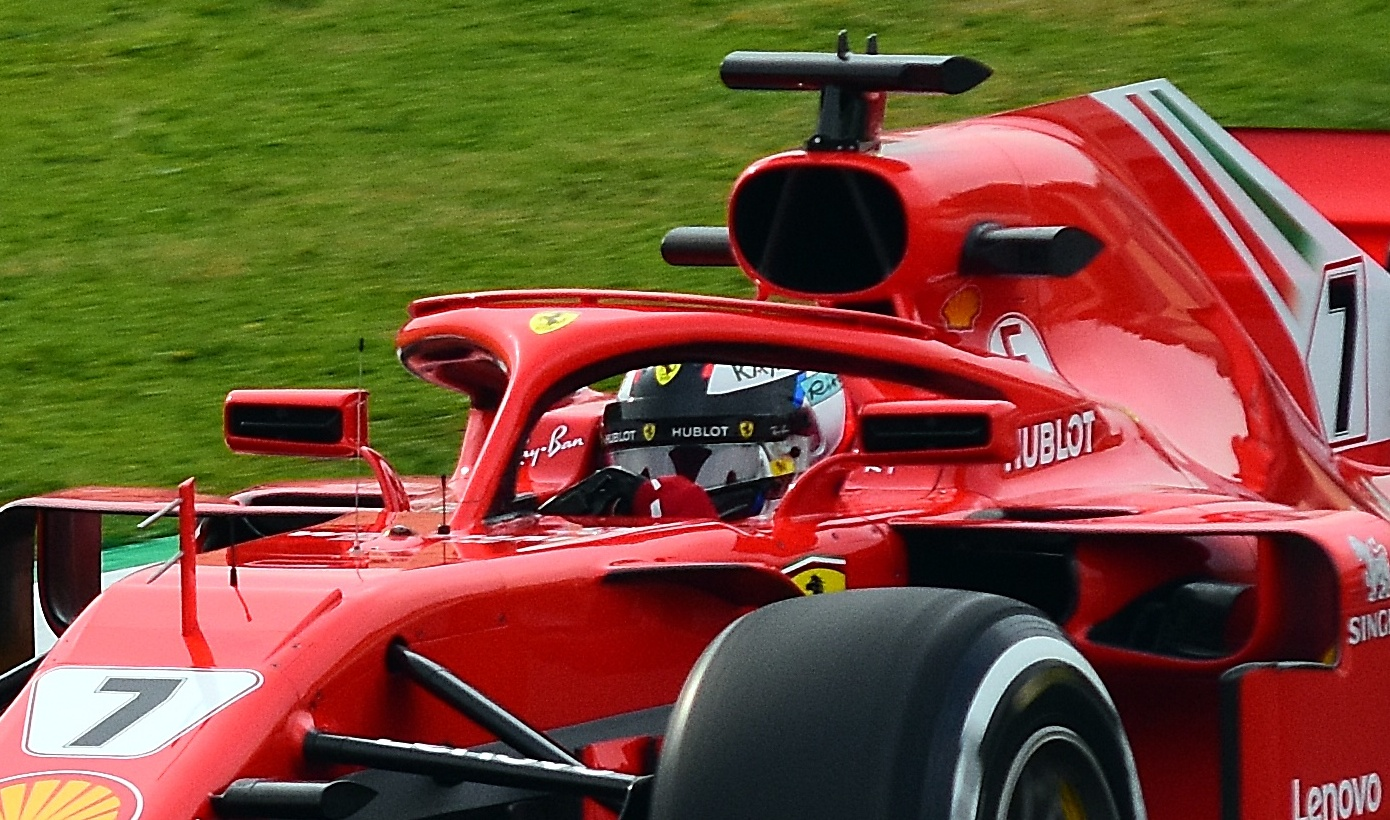
The halo system on a Ferrari SF71H driven by Kimi Räikkönen during pre-season testing in February 2018

The halo is a driver crash-protection system used in open-wheel racing series, which consists of a curved bar placed above the driver's head to protect it from injury.

The first tests of the halo were carried out in 2016 and in July 2017. Since the 2018 season, the FIA has made the halo mandatory on every vehicle in Formula 1, Formula 2, Formula 3, Formula 4, Formula Regional, and Formula E as a safety measure. Other open-wheel racing series also utilize the halo, such as the IndyCar Series, Indy NXT, Super Formula, Super Formula Lights, Euroformula Open and Australian S5000. The IndyCar halo is used as a structural frame for the aeroscreen.

== Construction ==
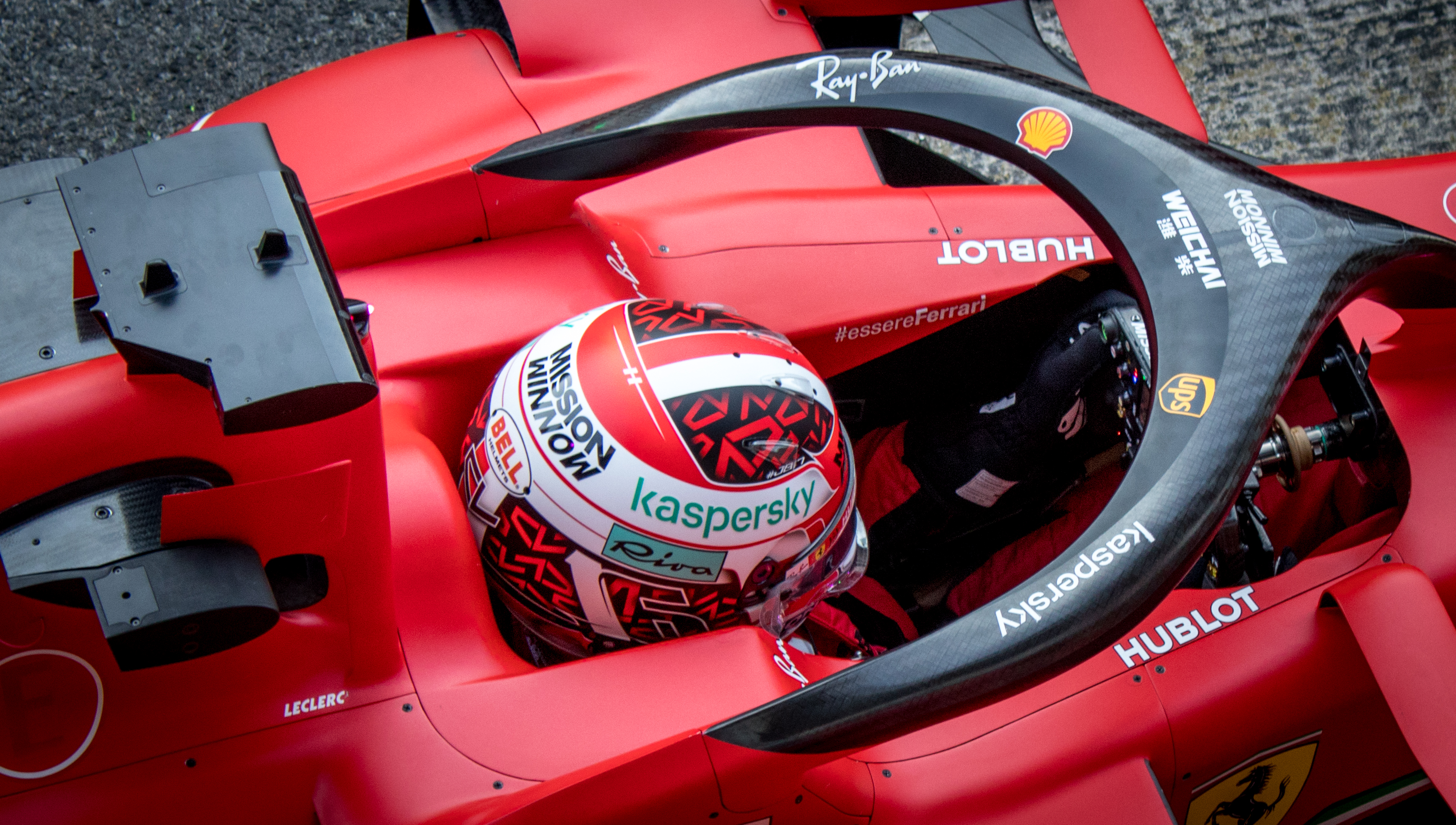
The halo is made of titanium and features a central post directly in the driver's line of vision. Pictured here, a Ferrari SF1000 driven by Charles Leclerc.

The device consists of a bar that surrounds the driver's head and is connected by three points to the vehicle frame. The halo is made of titanium and weighed around 7 kilograms (15 lb) in the version presented in 2016, then rose to 9 kilograms (20 lb) in 2017.

In FIA series the halo system is not developed by the teams, but is manufactured by three approved external manufacturers chosen by the FIA and has the same specification for all vehicles.

In a simulation performed by the FIA, using data from 40 incidents, use of the system provided a 17% increase in the survival rate of the driver.

== History and development ==
In 2009, 2 major accidents happened in top level FIA open wheel series, the fatal accident of Henry Surtees at the Brands Hatch round of the 2009 Formula 2 season and the accident Felipe Massa sustained during qualifying at the 2009 Hungarian Grand Prix. The accidents led to calls for additional cockpit protection.

Initially, the FIA looked into the development of closed cockpit systems, visors, and forward roll structures. "Fighter-jet style" screens were largely seen as the least effective early due to problems with flexing too much or shattering, depending on material used.

During development, the FIA examined three fundamental scenarios—collision between two vehicles, contact between a vehicle and the surrounding environment (such as barriers) and collisions with vehicles and debris. Tests demonstrated that the halo system can significantly reduce the risk of injury to the driver. In many cases, the system was able to prevent the helmet from coming into contact with a barrier when checked against a series of accidents that had occurred in the past. During the study of collisions with vehicles and debris it was found that the halo was able to deflect large objects and provide greater protection against smaller debris.

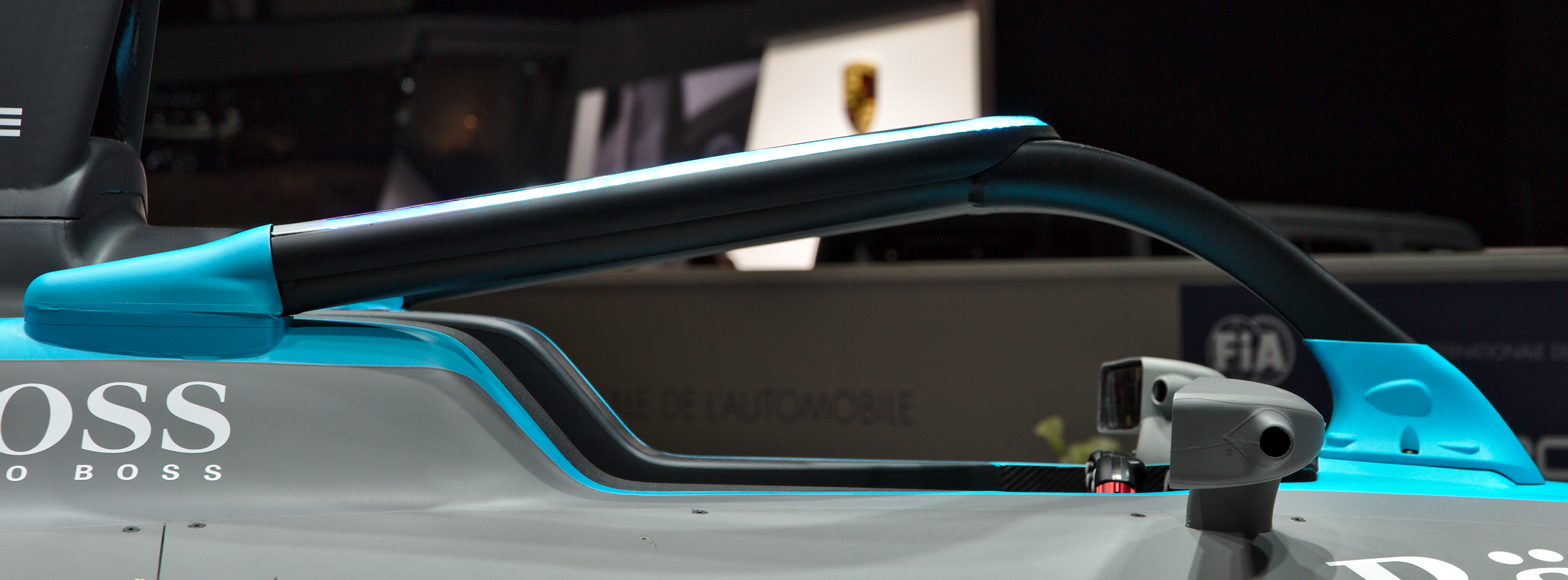
Halo system at the Spark SRT05e. The halo for the FIA Formula E Championship Gen2 car includes a strip of LED lights that indicate the level of power mode the car is in (blue for ATTACK MODE and magenta for Fanboost).

In August 2017, the Dallara F2 2018 was presented and was the first to install the halo system. The SRT05e Formula E car presented in January 2018 had a halo. In November 2018, the 2019 FIA Formula 3 car, which was unveiled in Abu Dhabi, installed the halo as well. Beginning in 2021, the Indy Lights' IL-15 began using the halo.

=== Alternative systems ===
As an alternative to the halo system, Red Bull Advanced Technologies developed the transparent Aeroscreen. The design, which is similar to a small fairing, did not receive much interest from the FIA. In 2019 the Aeroscreen was adapted to use the halo as a structural frame for use in IndyCar.

After the drivers had expressed their opposition to the introduction of the halo system, the FIA developed Shield, a transparent polyvinyl chloride screen. Sebastian Vettel was the first and only driver to try Shield in a Formula 1 car. During the free practice for the 2017 British Grand Prix, he completed a lap with the new system before ending the test early. He complained of distorted and blurred vision that prevented him from driving. Its introduction was subsequently excluded, as there was no guarantee that the issues with Shield could be solved in time for the 2018 season.

=== Initial reception ===
The system aroused some criticism before it was involved in any incidents, including that of Niki Lauda, who claimed that the system distorted the "essence of racing cars". The system was also initially unpopular with fans, with some saying that it was visually unappealing, against the concept of open-cockpit racing, and obstructed the driver's vision. There were safety concerns from several teams, including Ferrari and Mercedes, some drivers stating the invention would make it "harder for the driver to get out of the car". Though other former drivers, including Jackie Stewart, welcomed the system and compared it to the introduction of seat belts, which had been similarly criticized but became the norm in racing and regular vehicles.

=== Cost ===
A single halo can cost between €13,000 and €24,000. Both cars operated by a team must have a halo.

== Notable interventions ==
- At the 2018 Formula 2 race in Spain, Tadasuke Makino's halo was landed on by fellow Japanese driver Nirei Fukuzumi's car. In the 2018 Belgian Grand Prix, Charles Leclerc's halo was struck by Fernando Alonso's airborne McLaren, and both of their halos showed visible damage from the impact. Both Makino and Leclerc credited the halo for possibly saving their lives, and Mercedes team principal Toto Wolff, who had criticised the halo earlier in the season, said that saving Leclerc from injury made the halo "worth it" despite its "terrible aesthetics".
- During a Formula 3 event at Monza on 7 September 2019 the halo potentially saved the life of Alex Peroni, after his vehicle became airborne and crashed.
- At the 2020 Bahrain Grand Prix, Romain Grosjean crashed into the barriers head-on. The halo deflected the upper section of the barrier, protecting Grosjean's head from the impact. Despite initial concern over drivers being unable to evacuate quickly due to the halo, Grosjean was able to climb out largely unassisted, despite the car catching fire upon impact. Grosjean said, "I wasn't for the halo some years ago, but I think it's the greatest thing that we've brought to Formula 1, and without it I wouldn't be able to speak with you today." In a similar pre-halo accident at the 1974 United States Grand Prix, driver Helmut Koinigg was decapitated.
- At the 2021 Italian Grand Prix, Max Verstappen and Lewis Hamilton collided. Verstappen's wheel landed on the halo protecting Hamilton's head, with Hamilton later saying it "saved my neck".
- At the 2022 British Grand Prix, Zhou Guanyu said the halo saved his life after his Alfa Romeo flipped, spun, and careered over the tyre barrier, because the vehicle's roll hoop collapsed as soon as it hit the tarmac. During the Formula 2 feature race earlier in the day, the halo potentially saved the life of Roy Nissany after a collision with Dennis Hauger. Hauger's car was catapulted by a sausage curb after being forced off the track by Nissany, then crashed on to the top of Nissany's car.
- The opening lap of the first 2022 Seoul ePrix had a multi-car collision that involved Nyck de Vries, Oliver Turvey, Dan Ticktum, Oliver Askew, André Lotterer, Sébastien Buemi, Norman Nato, and Nick Cassidy. De Vries' car submarined under Buemi's car as it lost control into a wall, only for Lotterer to hit de Vries from behind, due to a combination of poor track visibility and a wet road. De Vries came out unscathed, praised the halo, and commented that "I would be even smaller than I am" without it.
- During the sixth lap of the 2022 Spa-Francorchamps Formula 3 round Sprint Race, Oliver Goethe's car hit a barrier on the exit of Blanchimont, forcing it to flip upside down and land on Zane Maloney's car. Both drivers were escorted out of their cars with Maloney suffering from only minor bruises on his hands.
- At the 2023 Baku Formula 2 round Jehan Daruvala's car went under Victor Martins' car during a safety restart. Daruvala said "I had nowhere to go and I'm glad the halo was here today".
- At the 2023 Indianapolis 500, Felix Rosenqvist spun out of turn 2 with 16 laps to go. While attempting to dodge Rosenqvist, Kyle Kirkwood's back left tyre came into contact with Rosenqvist's back tyre, completely dislodging Kirkwood's tyre. Kirkwood impacted the outside wall in turn 2 heavily, causing the car to flip over and slide to a halt upside down. Neither driver was injured. Video shows the Aeroscreen protecting Kirkwood from making contact directly with the track and barrier as the car was sliding.
- During the 28 June 2025 Formula 2 sprint race at Austria's Red Bull Ring, the Trident Motorsport car of Sami Meguetounif made contact with and went over the top of the cars of Arvid Lindblad and Luke Browning, flipping over as it went. Former racer Alex Brundle, who was commentating the race, credited the halo for keeping Browning from harm, saying "Chalk another one up for the Halo, guys, because that, as the Trident rolls over the top, as the rollhoop of the Trident tries to encroach the cockpit for Browning, and the Halo prevents it." No drivers involved were injured.

Awards
Preceded by Frédéric Sausset (2016)	Autosport; Pioneering and Innovation Award; 2018	Succeeded by W Series
