= Gunston (cigarette) =

South African cigarette brand

- Product type: Cigarette
- Current owner: British American Tobacco
- Produced by: BAT South Africa
- Country: South Africa
- Introduced: 1950s
- Markets: Switzerland, South Africa, Namibia
- Previous owners: "Winston Tobacco Company"
- Registered as a trademark in: 19 June 1973, expired 19 June 2004
- Tagline: "Men Rate Gunston Great"

Gunston is a South African brand of cigarettes, currently owned and manufactured by the South African subsidiary of conglomerate British American Tobacco.

== History ==
Gunston was established in the 1950s by the Winston Tobacco Company in South Africa. It enjoyed significant popularity in the South African market until its sales began to decrease, with consumers increasingly favoring other brands like Peter Stuyvesant and Marlboro.

On April 28, 1972, a trademark request for the phrase "Gunston cigarettes" was submitted and subsequently approved on June 19, 1973. This trademark remained valid until June 19, 2004.

In December 1999, the Independent Online reported that Gunston, along with brands like John Player International, Camel Plain, and Gitanes, faced the possibility of being banned if the manufacturers did not reduce the tar content in these brands. Manufacturers were given a three-month window to comply with the new regulations, and they did so. These regulations were aligned with the 1999 recommendations from the World Health Organization, which set a maximum limit of 15 mg of tar and 1.5 mg of nicotine in cigarettes. It was also planned to further reduce these limits to 12 mg of tar and 1.2 mg of nicotine after two or three years.

== Advertising ==
Pack of Gunston with a text warning above

Various magazine and poster advertisements were made to advertise the brand. Some ads also included Team Gunston (a Formula One team owned by the Rhodesian racing driver John Love) and the "Gunston 500", a South African surf competition. The slogan that was frequently used was "Men Rate Gunston Great".

Some radio advertisements for Springbok Radio were also made.

== Sponsorships ==
=== Formula 1 ===
Gunston provided sponsorship to Team Gunston from 1968 to 1975. This sponsorship marked an early instance of tobacco sponsorship in motor racing. They supported Rhodesian drivers John Love and Sam Tingle during the 1968 South African Championship for Formula 1 and Formula 5000 vehicles. Before their involvement in Formula 1 sponsorship, the team also participated in the non-championship event, the Rhodesian Grand Prix, which took place at the James McNeillie Circuit in Bulawayo.

=== South African F2 ===
Gunston sponsored Team Gunston in the South African F2.

=== Kyalami 9 Hours ===
Gunston sponsored Team Gunston in the Kyalami 9 Hours (also known as the 1000 km of Kyalami).

=== Surfing ===
Gunston served as the primary sponsor for the surfing championship previously known as the "Durban 500." However, once Gunston took on this sponsorship, the event's name was changed to the "Gunston 500" surfing championship. This sponsorship came to an end when tobacco sponsorships were prohibited in South Africa in 1999.

== See also ==
- Tobacco smoking
