= John Love (racing driver) =

Rhodesian racing driver (1924–2005)

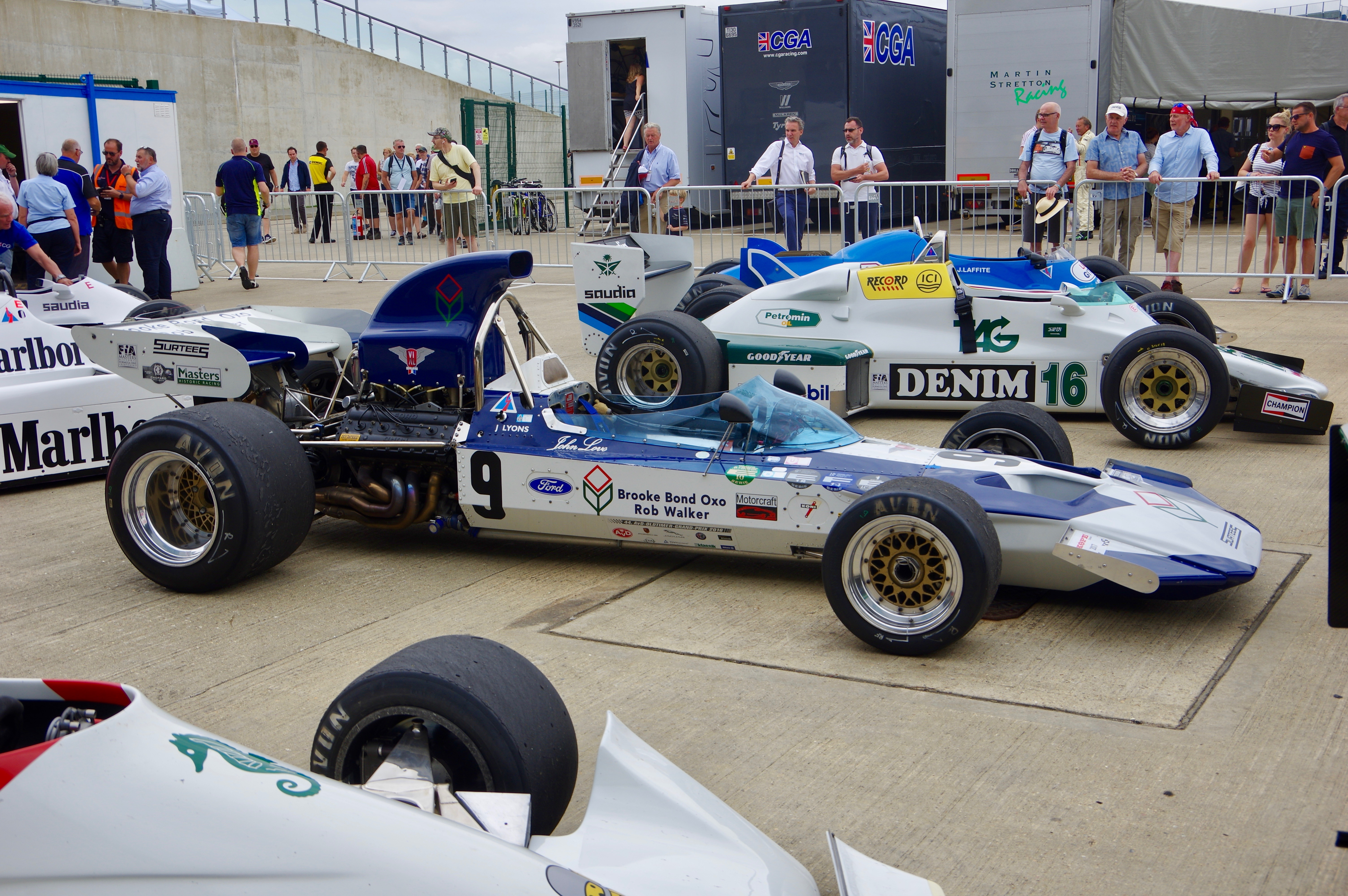
- John Love's Surtees TS9
- Born: John Maxwell Lineham Love; 7 December 1924; Bulawayo, Southern Rhodesia
- Died: 25 April 2005 (aged 80); Bulawayo, Zimbabwe

Formula One World Championship career
- Nationality: Federation of Rhodesia and Nyasaland (1962–1964); Rhodesian (1964) (1965 and 1967–1968); Rhodesian (1969–1972)
- Active years: 1962–1965, 1967–1972
- Team(s): Cooper, privateer (Cooper, Brabham, Lotus, March, Surtees)
- Entries: 10 (9 starts)
- Championships: 0
- Wins: 0
- Podiums: 1
- Career points: 6
- Pole positions: 0
- Fastest laps: 0
- First entry: 1962 South African Grand Prix
- Last entry: 1972 South African Grand Prix

John Maxwell Lineham Love (7 December 1924 – 25 April 2005) was a Rhodesian racing driver. He participated in ten Formula One World Championship Grands Prix, debuting on 29 December 1962. He achieved one podium, and scored a total of six championship points. He also won the 1962 British Saloon Car Championship, now known as the British Touring Car Championship. All but one of his Formula One entries were in races held within Africa, either as championship or non-championship rounds.

Love was born in Bulawayo. He attended Gifford High School. He started his car racing career in a single-seat Cooper F3 with a Manx Norton 500 cc engine after racing a Triumph Grand Prix motorcycle, which Love then-allowed Jim Redman to ride when starting his race career, in recognition of Redman's assistance in preparing and maintaining Love's Cooper.

Six times South African Formula One Champion in the 1960s, Love had originally shone in the European Formula Junior firmament back in 1961–62 at the wheel of a Cooper-Austin from Ken Tyrrell's team. An unfortunate accident at Albi resulted in a very badly broken arm and effectively thwarted his chances of moving into full-time Formula One, but he came close when he was nominated as Phil Hill's replacement in the works Cooper team for the 1964 Italian Grand Prix at Monza.

Love was a regular contestant in the South African Grand Prix from 1965 to 1972. He was leading the 1967 South African Grand Prix at Kyalami in his 2.7 L Climax-engined Cooper, when a misfire prompted him to make a precautionary stop for extra fuel. He dropped back to finish second behind the works Cooper-Maserati of Pedro Rodríguez.

Love would dominate racing in southern Africa in the 1960s, winning the South African Formula One Championship six times in succession from 1964 to 1969. He would also win his home race, the Rhodesian Grand Prix, six times.

Love owned the Jaguar dealership in Bulawayo and had his own stock car racing team in the 1980s. He died in 2005, aged 80, from cancer, in Bulawayo.

== Racing record ==
=== Complete Formula One World Championship results ===
(key)

| Year | Entrant | Chassis | Engine | 1 | 2 | 3 | 4 | 5 | 6 | 7 | 8 | 9 | 10 | 11 | 12 | 13 | WDC | Points |
|---|---|---|---|---|---|---|---|---|---|---|---|---|---|---|---|---|---|---|
| 1962 | John Love | Cooper T55 | Climax FPF 1.5 L4 | NED | MON | BEL | FRA | GBR | GER | ITA | USA | RSA; 8 | | | | | NC | 0 |
| 1963 | John Love | Cooper T55 | Climax FPF 1.5 L4 | MON | BEL | NED | FRA | GBR | GER | ITA | USA | MEX | RSA; 9 | | | | NC | 0 |
| 1964 | Cooper Car Company | Cooper T73 | Climax FWMV 1.5 V8 | MON | NED | BEL | FRA | GBR | GER | AUT | ITA; DNQ | USA | MEX | | | | NC | 0 |
| 1965 | John Love | Cooper T55 | Climax FPF 1.5 L4 | RSA; Ret | MON | BEL | FRA | GBR | NED | GER | ITA | USA | MEX | | | | NC | 0 |
| 1967 | John Love | Cooper T79 | Climax FPF 2.7 L4 | RSA; 2 | MON | NED | BEL | FRA | GBR | GER | CAN | ITA | USA | MEX | | | 11th | 6 |
| 1968 | Team Gunston | Brabham BT20 | Repco-Brabham RB620 3.0 V8 | RSA; 9 | ESP | MON | BEL | NED | FRA | GBR | GER | ITA | CAN | USA | MEX | | NC | 0 |
| 1969 | Team Gunston | Lotus 49 | Ford Cosworth DFV 3.0 V8 | RSA; Ret | ESP | MON | NED | FRA | GBR | GER | ITA | CAN | USA | MEX | | | NC | 0 |
| 1970 | Team Gunston | Lotus 49 | Ford Cosworth DFV 3.0 V8 | RSA; 8 | ESP | MON | BEL | NED | FRA | GBR | GER | AUT | ITA | CAN | USA | MEX | NC | 0 |
| 1971 | Team Peco/Gunston | March 701 | Ford Cosworth DFV 3.0 V8 | RSA; Ret | ESP | MON | NED | FRA | GBR | GER | AUT | ITA | CAN | USA | | | NC | 0 |
| 1972 | Team Gunston | Surtees TS9 | Ford Cosworth DFV 3.0 V8 | ARG | RSA; 16 | ESP | MON | BEL | FRA | GBR | GER | AUT | ITA | CAN | USA | | NC | 0 |

=== Complete Formula One non-championship results ===
(key)

| Year | Entrant | Chassis | Engine | 1 | 2 | 3 | 4 | 5 | 6 | 7 | 8 | 9 | 10 | 11 | 12 | 13 | 14 | 15 | 16 | 17 | 18 | 19 | 20 | 21 |
|---|---|---|---|---|---|---|---|---|---|---|---|---|---|---|---|---|---|---|---|---|---|---|---|---|
| 1961 | A.H. Pillman | LDS Mk1 | Porsche Flat-4 | LOM | GLV | PAU | BRX | VIE | AIN | SYR | NAP | LON | SIL | SOL | KAN | DAN | MOD | FLG | OUL | LEW | VAL | RAN; WD | NAT; DNS | RSA; WD |
| 1962 | A.H. Pillman | LDS Mk1 | Porsche Flat-4 | CAP; 9 | BRX | LOM | LAV | GLV | PAU | AIN | INT | NAP | MAL | CLP | RMS | SOL | KAN | MED | DAN | OUL | MEX | RAN | | |
| 1962 | John Love | Cooper T55 | Climax Straight-4 | | | | | | | | | | | | | | | | | | | | NAT; 6 | |
| 1963 | John Love | Cooper T55 | Climax Straight-4 | LOM | GLV | PAU | IMO | SYR | AIN | INT | ROM | SOL | KAN | MED | AUT | OUL | RAN; 4 | | | | | | | |
| 1964 | John Love | Cooper T55 | Climax Straight-4 | DMT | NWT | SYR | AIN | INT | SOL | MED | RAN; 8 | | | | | | | | | | | | | |
| 1965 | John Love | Cooper T55 | Climax Straight-4 | **CAP**; 2 | ROC | SYR | SMT | INT | MED | | | | | | | | | | | | | | | |
| 1965 | John Love | Cooper T79 | Climax Straight-4 | | | | | | | RAN; 4 | | | | | | | | | | | | | | |
| 1966 | John Love | Cooper T79 | Climax Straight-4 | RSA; 6 | SYR | INT | OUL | | | | | | | | | | | | | | | | | |

=== Complete British Saloon Car Championship results ===
(key) (Races in bold indicate pole position; races in italics indicate fastest lap.)

| Year | Team | Car | Class | 1 | 2 | 3 | 4 | 5 | 6 | 7 | 8 | 9 | 10 | 11 | DC | Pts | Class |
|---|---|---|---|---|---|---|---|---|---|---|---|---|---|---|---|---|---|
| 1962 | Cooper Car Co. | Morris Mini Cooper | A | SNE ovr:? cls:1 | GOO; Ret | AIN ovr:11 cls:1 | SIL ovr:7 cls:1 | CRY ovr:5 cls:1 | | | | | | | **1st** | **58** | **1st** |
| 1962 | Cooper Car Co. | Austin Mini Cooper | A | | | | | | AIN ovr:6 cls:1 | BRH ovr:6 cls:1 | OUL ovr:? cls:1 | | | | **1st** | **58** | **1st** |
| 1963 | Cooper Car Co. | Morris Mini Cooper | A | SNE | OUL | GOO ovr:? cls:? | AIN | SIL | CRY | SIL | BRH | BRH | OUL | SIL | NC | 0 | NC |
| 1964 | Cooper Car Co. | Austin Mini Cooper S | A | SNE | GOO | OUL | AIN | SIL | CRY | BRH | OUL; Ret | | | | NC | 0 | NC |

Sporting positions
| Preceded by John Whitmore | British Saloon Car Championship; Champion; 1962 | Succeeded by Jack Sears |
| Preceded by Neville Lederle | South African Formula One Championship; Champion; 1964–1969 | Succeeded by Dave Charlton |
