= Team Gunston =

Car racing team

- Full name: Team Gunston; John Love
- Base: South Africa
- Founder(s): John Love
- Noted staff: John Love
- Noted drivers: John Love; Sam Tingle; Ian Scheckter; Eddie Keizan

Formula One World Championship career
- First entry: 1962 South African Grand Prix
- Races entered: 11
- Drivers' Championships: 0
- Race victories: 0
- Pole positions: 0
- Fastest laps: 0
- Final entry: 1975 South African Grand Prix

Team Gunston was a privateer team founded by Rhodesian racing driver John Love to enter his own cars in Formula One and sports car racing between 1962 and 1975. He also entered cars under his own name, i.e. John Love. Commonly the vehicles were entered for Love himself, but he also provided cars for a number of other drivers during the period.

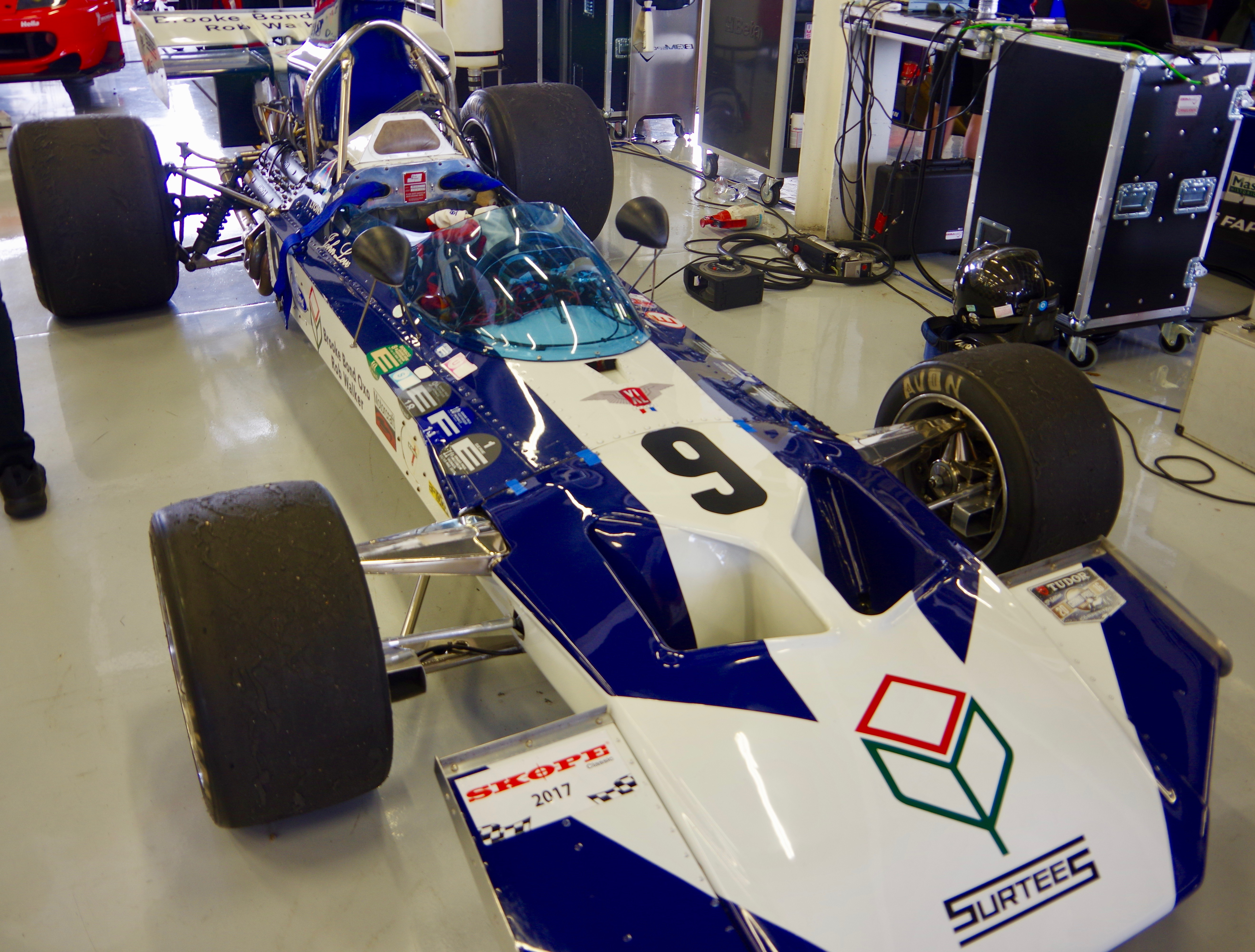
Love's Surtees TS9

At the 1968 South African Grand Prix Team Gunston became the first Formula One team to implement sponsorship brands as a livery when they entered a private Brabham car.

== Complete Formula One World Championship results ==
(key) (Results in bold indicate pole position; results in italics indicate fastest lap.)

Year	Entrant	Chassis	Engine(s)	Tyres	Drivers	1	2	3	4	5	6	7	8	9	10	11	12	13	14	15
1962	John Love	Cooper T55	Climax FPF 1.5 L4	**D**		NED	MON	BEL	FRA	GBR	GER	ITA	USA	RSA						
1962	John Love	Cooper T55	Climax FPF 1.5 L4	**D**	(Federation of Rhodesia and Nyasaland) John Love									8						
1963	John Love	Cooper T55	Climax FPF 1.5 L4	**D**		MON	BEL	NED	FRA	GBR	GER	ITA	USA	MEX	RSA					
1963	John Love	Cooper T55	Climax FPF 1.5 L4	**D**	(Federation of Rhodesia and Nyasaland) John Love										9					
1965	John Love	Cooper T55	Climax FPF 1.5 L4	**D**		RSA	MON	BEL	FRA	GBR	NED	GER	ITA	USA	MEX					
1965	John Love	Cooper T55	Climax FPF 1.5 L4	**D**	(Rhodesia) John Love	Ret														
1967	John Love	Cooper T79	Climax FPF 2.8 L4	**F**		RSA	MON	NED	BEL	FRA	GBR	GER	CAN	ITA	USA	MEX				
1967	John Love	Cooper T79	Climax FPF 2.8 L4	**F**	(Rhodesia) John Love	2														
1968	Team Gunston	Brabham BT20; LDS Mk 3	Repco 620 3.0 V8	**D** **F**		RSA	ESP	MON	BEL	NED	FRA	GBR	GER	ITA	CAN	USA	MEX			
1968	Team Gunston	Brabham BT20; LDS Mk 3	Repco 620 3.0 V8	**D** **F**	(Rhodesia) John Love	9														
1968	Team Gunston	Brabham BT20; LDS Mk 3	Repco 620 3.0 V8	**D** **F**	(Rhodesia) Sam Tingle	Ret														
1968	John Love	Cooper T79	Climax FPF 2.8 L4	**D** **F**	(South Africa) Basil van Rooyen	Ret														
1969	Team Gunston	Lotus 49; Brabham BT24	Ford Cosworth DFV 3.0 V8; Repco 620 3.0 V8	**D** **F**		RSA	ESP	MON	NED	FRA	GBR	GER	ITA	CAN	USA	MEX				
1969	Team Gunston	Lotus 49; Brabham BT24	Ford Cosworth DFV 3.0 V8; Repco 620 3.0 V8	**D** **F**	(Rhodesia) John Love	Ret														
1969	Team Gunston	Lotus 49; Brabham BT24	Ford Cosworth DFV 3.0 V8; Repco 620 3.0 V8	**D** **F**	(Rhodesia) Sam Tingle	8														
1970	Team Gunston	Lotus 49; Brabham BT26A	Ford Cosworth DFV 3.0 V8	**D** **G**		RSA	ESP	MON	BEL	NED	FRA	GBR	GER	AUT	ITA	CAN	USA	MEX		
1970	Team Gunston	Lotus 49; Brabham BT26A	Ford Cosworth DFV 3.0 V8	**D** **G**	(Rhodesia) John Love	8														
1970	Team Gunston	Lotus 49; Brabham BT26A	Ford Cosworth DFV 3.0 V8	**D** **G**	(South Africa) Peter de Klerk	11														
1971	Team Gunston	March 701; Brabham BT26A	Ford Cosworth DFV 3.0 V8	**F**		RSA	ESP	MON	NED	FRA	GBR	GER	AUT	ITA	CAN	USA				
1971	Team Gunston	March 701; Brabham BT26A	Ford Cosworth DFV 3.0 V8	**F**	(Rhodesia) John Love	Ret														
1971	Team Gunston	March 701; Brabham BT26A	Ford Cosworth DFV 3.0 V8	**F**	(South Africa) Jackie Pretorius	Ret														
1972	Team Gunston	Surtees TS9; Brabham BT33	Ford Cosworth DFV 3.0 V8	**F**		ARG	RSA	ESP	MON	BEL	FRA	GBR	GER	AUT	ITA	CAN	USA			
1972	Team Gunston	Surtees TS9; Brabham BT33	Ford Cosworth DFV 3.0 V8	**F**	(Rhodesia) John Love		16													
1972	Team Gunston	Surtees TS9; Brabham BT33	Ford Cosworth DFV 3.0 V8	**F**	(South Africa) Willie Ferguson		DNS													
1974	Team Gunston	Lotus 72E	Ford Cosworth DFV 3.0 V8	**G**		ARG	BRA	RSA	ESP	BEL	MON	SWE	NED	FRA	GBR	GER	AUT	ITA	CAN	USA
1974	Team Gunston	Lotus 72E	Ford Cosworth DFV 3.0 V8	**G**	(South Africa) Ian Scheckter			13												
1974	Team Gunston	Lotus 72E	Ford Cosworth DFV 3.0 V8	**G**	(South Africa) Paddy Driver			Ret												
1975	Team Gunston	Lotus 72D	Ford Cosworth DFV 3.0 V8	**G**		ARG	BRA	RSA	ESP	MON	BEL	SWE	NED	FRA	GBR	GER	AUT	ITA	USA	
1975	Team Gunston	Lotus 72D	Ford Cosworth DFV 3.0 V8	**G**	(South Africa) Guy Tunmer			11												
1975	Team Gunston	Lotus 72D	Ford Cosworth DFV 3.0 V8	**G**	(South Africa) Eddie Keizan			13												
