= Jackie Pretorius =

South African racing driver (1934–2009)

- Born: 22 November 1934; Potchefstroom, Union of South Africa
- Died: 30 March 2009 (aged 74); Johannesburg, South Africa

Formula One World Championship career
- Nationality: (South Africa) South African
- Active years: 1965, 1968, 1971, 1973
- Team(s): non-works Brabham, privateer LDS, Frank Williams Racing Cars
- Entries: 4 (3 starts)
- Championships: 0
- Wins: 0
- Podiums: 0
- Career points: 0
- Pole positions: 0
- Fastest laps: 0
- First entry: 1965 South African Grand Prix
- Last entry: 1973 South African Grand Prix

Jacobus "Jackie" Pretorius (22 November 1934 – 30 March 2009) was a racing driver from South Africa. He participated in four Formula One World Championship Grands Prix, debuting on 1 January 1965, and scoring no championship points.

Pretorius competed in Formula One at national level in his home country of South Africa, enjoying some success throughout the late 1960s and early 1970s also by winning the 3 Hours of Pietermaritzburg in 1967. After racing a Lotus and a Lola, he won two races in 1971 driving a Brabham.

Pretorius died in Johannesburg aged 74, on 30 March 2009, after being in a coma for three weeks. He was attacked in his home early on a Friday morning by burglars. His wife Shirley died in a similar incident in the same house several years earlier.

== Complete Formula One World Championship results ==
(key)

| Year | Entrant | Chassis | Engine | 1 | 2 | 3 | 4 | 5 | 6 | 7 | 8 | 9 | 10 | 11 | 12 | 13 | 14 | 15 | WDC | Points |
|---|---|---|---|---|---|---|---|---|---|---|---|---|---|---|---|---|---|---|---|---|
| 1965 | Jackie Pretorius | LDS Mk 1 | Alfa Romeo Straight-4 | RSA; DNPQ | MON | BEL | FRA | GBR | NED | GER | ITA | USA | MEX | | | | | | NC | 0 |
| 1968 | Team Pretoria | Brabham BT11 | Climax Straight-4 | RSA; NC | ESP | MON | BEL | NED | FRA | GBR | GER | ITA | CAN | USA | MEX | | | | NC | 0 |
| 1971 | Team Gunston | Brabham BT26A | Cosworth V8 | RSA; Ret | ESP | MON | NED | FRA | GBR | GER | AUT | ITA | CAN | USA | | | | | NC | 0 |
| 1973 | Frank Williams Racing Cars | Iso–Marlboro FX3B | Cosworth V8 | ARG | BRA | RSA; Ret | ESP | BEL | MON | SWE | FRA | GBR | NED | GER | AUT | ITA | CAN | USA | NC | 0 |
