= 1968 Formula One season =

22nd season of the FIA's Formula One motor racing

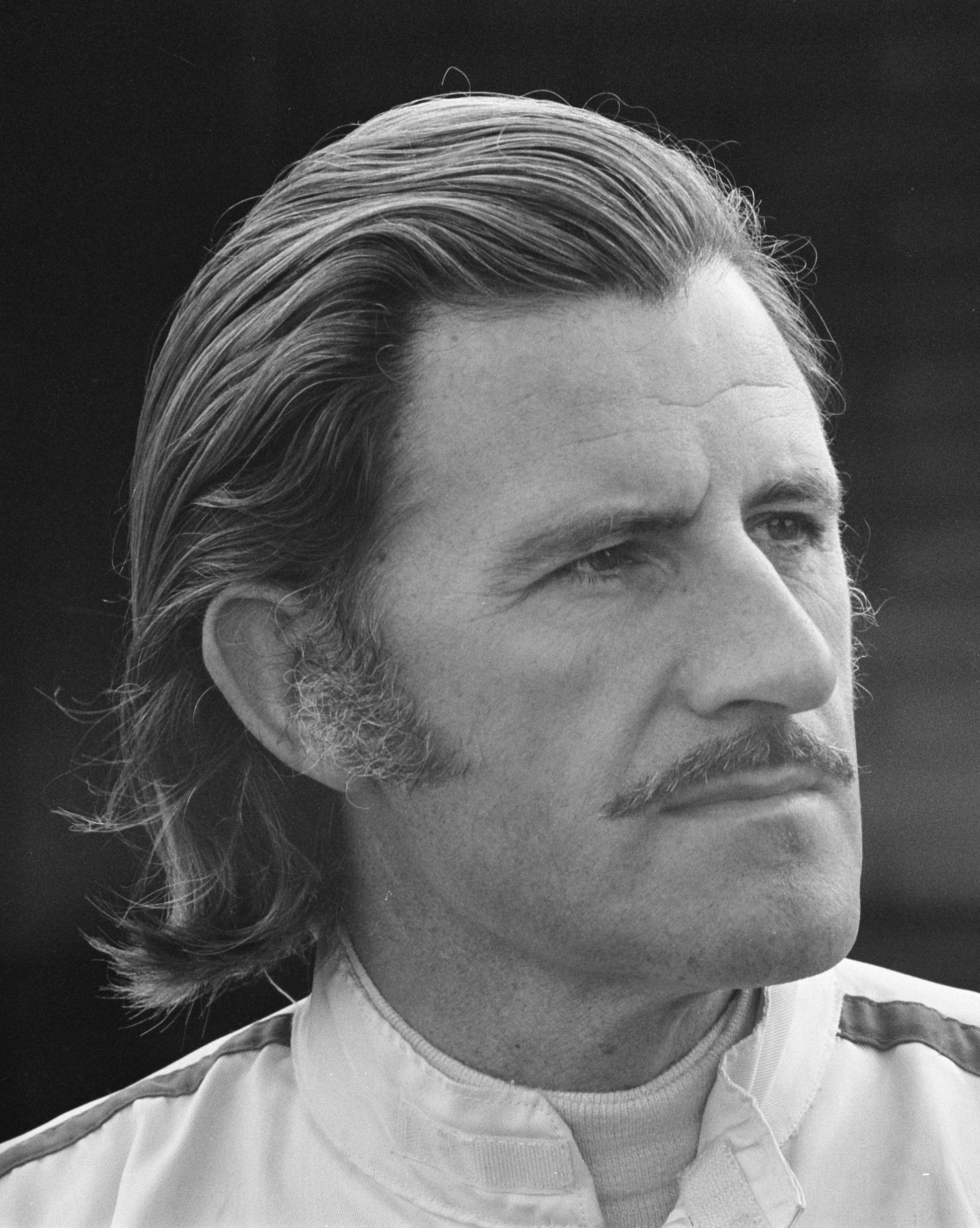
Graham Hill won his second championship, driving a Lotus-Ford.

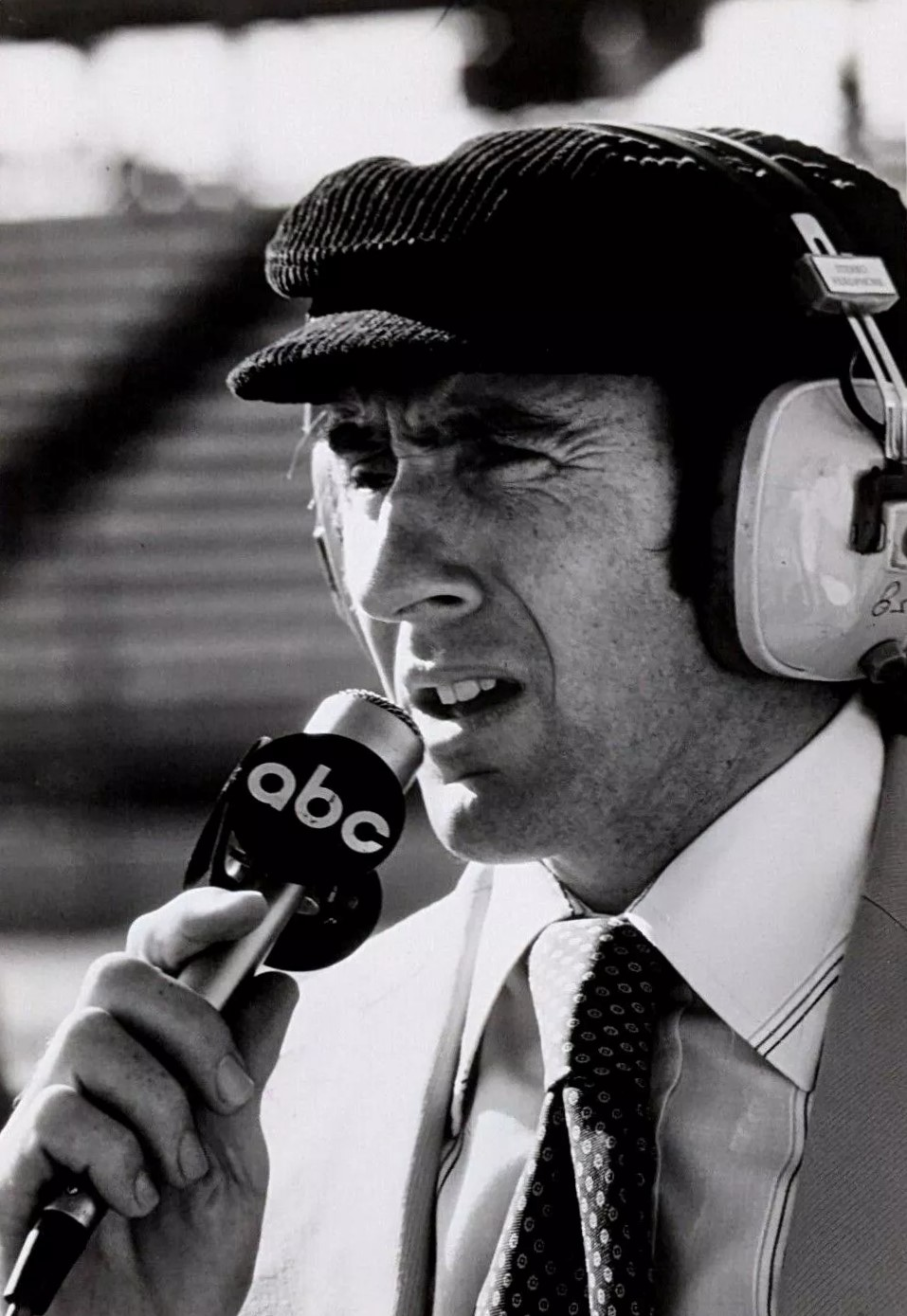
Jackie Stewart finished as runner-up in the World Drivers' Championship.

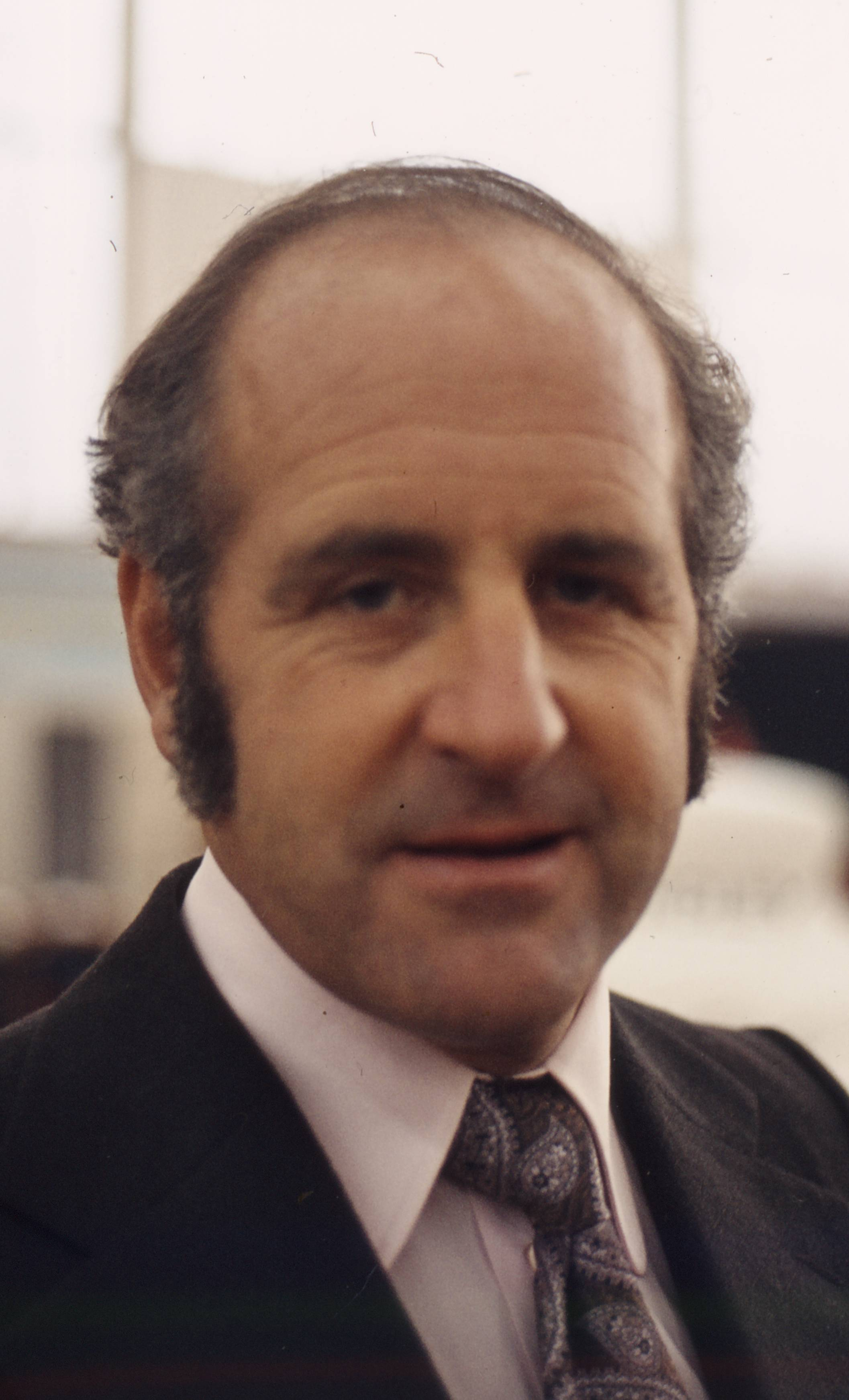
Defending Champion Denny Hulme finished third in the championship.

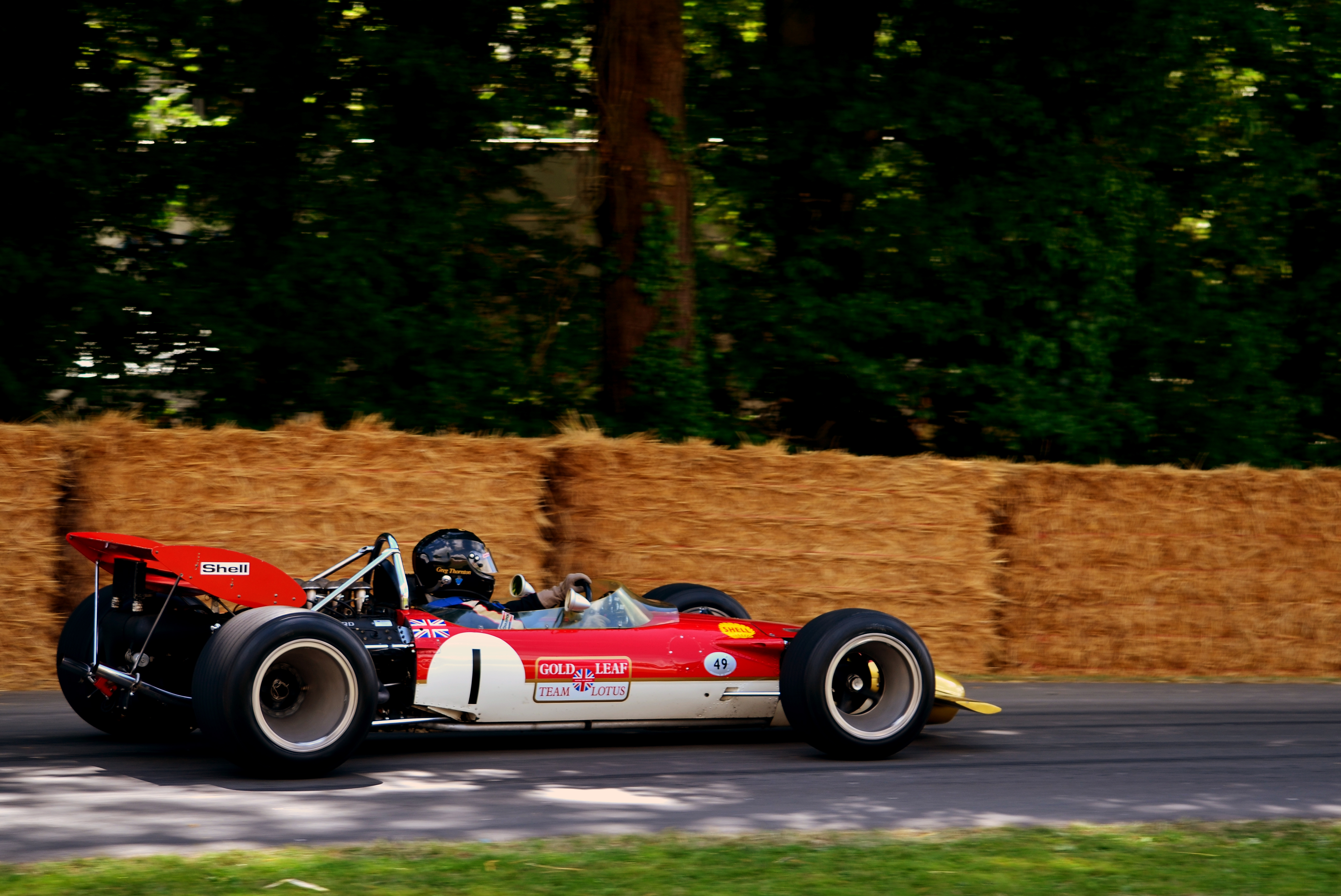
Lotus won the International Cup for F1 Manufacturers with the Lotus 49 & 49B.

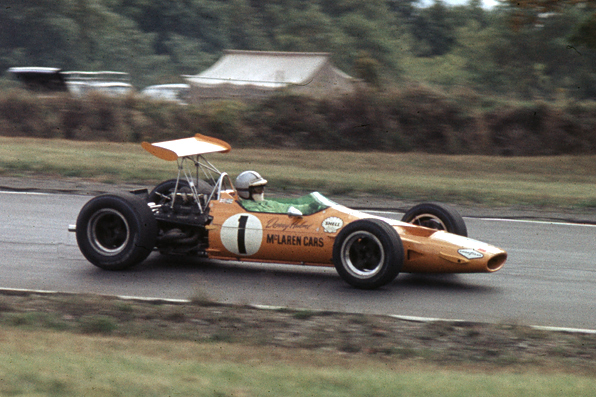
McLaren finished runner- up with the McLaren M5A & M7A.

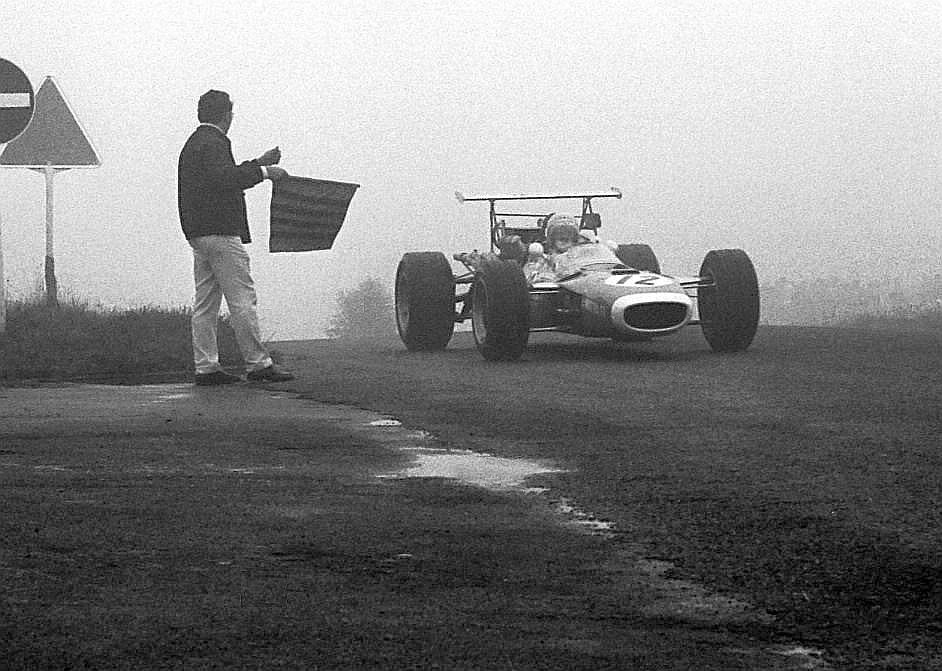
Matra finished third with the Matra MS7 & MS11.

The 1968 Formula One season was the 22nd season of the FIA's Formula One motor racing. It featured the 19th World Championship of Drivers, the 11th International Cup for F1 Manufacturers, and three non-championship races open to Formula One cars. The World Championship was contested over twelve races between 1 January and 3 November 1968.

Great Britain driver Graham Hill, driving a Lotus-Ford Cosworth, won his second Drivers' Championship, six years after his first. Lotus were awarded the Manufacturers' Cup for the third time. Repco produced a more powerful version of their V8 to help Brabham's compete against Ford's new Cosworth DFV, but it proved very unreliable: Jochen Rindt qualified on pole position twice but also only finished twice. Hill's main rivals were Jackie Stewart at Tyrrell Matra and 1967 champion Denny Hulme at McLaren.

The 1968 season turned out to be a turning point in terms of safety, with four Grand Prix drivers being involved in fatal crashes: two-time World Champion Jim Clark, Mike Spence, Jo Schlesser and Ludovico Scarfiotti. It was the last year where all the races were run on tracks with almost no safety modifications.

On the topic of technology, the 1968 headlines were dominated by the wings introduced by Lotus's owner Colin Chapman. He installed modest front wings and a rear spoiler on his Lotus 49B at the 1968 Monaco Grand Prix. Brabham and Ferrari went one better at the 1968 Belgian Grand Prix with full-width wings mounted on struts high above the driver. Lotus replied with a full-width wing directly connected to the rear suspension that required a re-design of the wishbones and transmission shafts. Matra then produced a high mounted front wing connected to the front suspension. This last innovation was mostly used during practice as it required a lot of effort from the driver. By the end of the season most teams were using sophisticated wings.

== Teams and drivers ==
The following teams and drivers competed in the 1968 FIA World Championship.

| Entrant | Constructor | Chassis | Engine | Tyre | Driver | Rounds |
|---|---|---|---|---|---|---|
| (United Kingdom) Bruce McLaren Motor Racing | McLaren-BRM | M5A | BRM P101 3.0 V12 | G | (New Zealand) Denny Hulme | 1 |
| (United Kingdom) Bruce McLaren Motor Racing | McLaren-Ford | M7A | Ford Cosworth DFV 3.0 V8 | G | (New Zealand) Denny Hulme | 2–12 |
| (United Kingdom) Bruce McLaren Motor Racing | McLaren-Ford | M7A | Ford Cosworth DFV 3.0 V8 | G | (New Zealand) Bruce McLaren | 2–12 |
| (United Kingdom) Brabham Racing Organisation | Brabham-Repco | BT24; BT26 | Repco 740 3.0 V8; Repco 860 3.0 V8 | G | (Australia) Jack Brabham | All |
| (United Kingdom) Brabham Racing Organisation | Brabham-Repco | BT24; BT26 | Repco 740 3.0 V8; Repco 860 3.0 V8 | G | (Austria) Jochen Rindt | All |
| (United Kingdom) Brabham Racing Organisation | Brabham-Repco | BT24; BT26 | Repco 740 3.0 V8; Repco 860 3.0 V8 | G | (United States) Dan Gurney | 5 |
| (United Kingdom) Team Lotus (United Kingdom) Gold Leaf Team Lotus | Lotus-Ford | 49; 49B | Ford Cosworth DFV 3.0 V8 | F | (United Kingdom) Jim Clark | 1 |
| (United Kingdom) Team Lotus (United Kingdom) Gold Leaf Team Lotus | Lotus-Ford | 49; 49B | Ford Cosworth DFV 3.0 V8 | F | (United Kingdom) Graham Hill | All |
| (United Kingdom) Team Lotus (United Kingdom) Gold Leaf Team Lotus | Lotus-Ford | 49; 49B | Ford Cosworth DFV 3.0 V8 | F | (United Kingdom) Jackie Oliver | 3–12 |
| (United Kingdom) Team Lotus (United Kingdom) Gold Leaf Team Lotus | Lotus-Ford | 49; 49B | Ford Cosworth DFV 3.0 V8 | F | (United States) Mario Andretti | 9, 11 |
| (United Kingdom) Team Lotus (United Kingdom) Gold Leaf Team Lotus | Lotus-Ford | 49; 49B | Ford Cosworth DFV 3.0 V8 | F | (Canada) Bill Brack | 10 |
| (United Kingdom) Team Lotus (United Kingdom) Gold Leaf Team Lotus | Lotus-Ford | 49; 49B | Ford Cosworth DFV 3.0 V8 | F | (Mexico) Moisés Solana | 12 |
| (United States) Anglo American Racers | Eagle-Weslake | T1G | Weslake 58 3.0 V12 | G | (United States) Dan Gurney | 1, 3, 7–9 |
| (United States) Anglo American Racers | McLaren-Ford | M7A | Ford Cosworth DFV 3.0 V8 | G | (United States) Dan Gurney | 10–12 |
| (Japan) Honda Racing | Honda | RA300; RA301; RA302 | Honda RA273E 3.0 V12; Honda RA301E 3.0 V12; Honda RA302E 3.0 V8 | F | (United Kingdom) John Surtees | All |
| (Japan) Honda Racing | Honda | RA300; RA301; RA302 | Honda RA273E 3.0 V12; Honda RA301E 3.0 V12; Honda RA302E 3.0 V8 | F | (France) Jo Schlesser | 6 |
| (Japan) Honda Racing | Honda | RA300; RA301; RA302 | Honda RA273E 3.0 V12; Honda RA301E 3.0 V12; Honda RA302E 3.0 V8 | F | (United Kingdom) David Hobbs | 9 |
| (Italy) Scuderia Ferrari SpA SEFAC | Ferrari | 312/67; 312/67/68; 312/68 | Ferrari 242 3.0 V12; Ferrari 242C 3.0 V12 | F | (New Zealand) Chris Amon | 1–2, 4–12 |
| (Italy) Scuderia Ferrari SpA SEFAC | Ferrari | 312/67; 312/67/68; 312/68 | Ferrari 242 3.0 V12; Ferrari 242C 3.0 V12 | F | (Belgium) Jacky Ickx | 1–2, 4–10, 12 |
| (Italy) Scuderia Ferrari SpA SEFAC | Ferrari | 312/67; 312/67/68; 312/68 | Ferrari 242 3.0 V12; Ferrari 242C 3.0 V12 | F | (Italy) Andrea de Adamich | 1 |
| (Italy) Scuderia Ferrari SpA SEFAC | Ferrari | 312/67; 312/67/68; 312/68 | Ferrari 242 3.0 V12; Ferrari 242C 3.0 V12 | F | (United Kingdom) Derek Bell | 9, 11 |
| (United Kingdom) Owen Racing Organisation | BRM | P115; P126; P133; P138 | BRM P101 3.0 V12; BRM P75 3.0 H16 | G | (Mexico) Pedro Rodríguez | All |
| (United Kingdom) Owen Racing Organisation | BRM | P115; P126; P133; P138 | BRM P101 3.0 V12; BRM P75 3.0 H16 | G | (United Kingdom) Mike Spence | 1 |
| (United Kingdom) Owen Racing Organisation | BRM | P115; P126; P133; P138 | BRM P101 3.0 V12; BRM P75 3.0 H16 | G | (United Kingdom) Richard Attwood | 3–8 |
| (United Kingdom) Owen Racing Organisation | BRM | P115; P126; P133; P138 | BRM P101 3.0 V12; BRM P75 3.0 H16 | G | (United States) Bobby Unser | 9, 11 |
| (United Kingdom) Cooper Car Company | Cooper-Maserati | T81B; T86 | Maserati 10/F1 3.0 V12 | F | (United Kingdom) Brian Redman | 1 |
| (United Kingdom) Cooper Car Company | Cooper-Maserati | T81B; T86 | Maserati 10/F1 3.0 V12 | F | (Italy) Ludovico Scarfiotti | 1 |
| (United Kingdom) Cooper Car Company | Cooper-BRM | T86B | BRM P101 3.0 V12 | F | (United Kingdom) Brian Redman | 2, 4 |
| (United Kingdom) Cooper Car Company | Cooper-BRM | T86B | BRM P101 3.0 V12 | F | (Italy) Ludovico Scarfiotti | 2–3 |
| (United Kingdom) Cooper Car Company | Cooper-BRM | T86B | BRM P101 3.0 V12 | F | (Belgium) Lucien Bianchi | 3–5, 8, 10–12 |
| (United Kingdom) Cooper Car Company | Cooper-BRM | T86B | BRM P101 3.0 V12 | F | (United Kingdom) Vic Elford | 6–12 |
| (United Kingdom) Cooper Car Company | Cooper-BRM | T86B | BRM P101 3.0 V12 | F | (France) Johnny Servoz-Gavin | 6 |
| (United Kingdom) Cooper Car Company | Cooper-BRM | T86B | BRM P101 3.0 V12 | F | (United Kingdom) Robin Widdows | 7 |
| (United Kingdom) Matra International | Matra-Ford | MS9; MS10 | Ford Cosworth DFV 3.0 V8 | D | (United Kingdom) Jackie Stewart | 1, 4–12 |
| (United Kingdom) Matra International | Matra-Ford | MS9; MS10 | Ford Cosworth DFV 3.0 V8 | D | (France) Johnny Servoz-Gavin | 3, 9–10, 12 |
| (United Kingdom) Matra International | Matra-Ford | MS9; MS10 | Ford Cosworth DFV 3.0 V8 | D | (France) Jean-Pierre Beltoise | 2 |
| (France) Matra Sports | Matra-Ford | MS7 | Ford Cosworth FVA 1.6 L4 | D | (France) Jean-Pierre Beltoise | 1 |
| (France) Matra Sports | Matra | MS11 | Matra MS9 3.0 V12 | D | (France) Jean-Pierre Beltoise | 3–12 |
| (France) Matra Sports | Matra | MS11 | Matra MS9 3.0 V12 | D | (France) Henri Pescarolo | 10–12 |
| (Rhodesia) Team Gunston | Brabham-Repco | BT20 | Repco 620 3.0 V8 | F | (Rhodesia) John Love | 1 |
| (Rhodesia) Team Gunston | LDS-Repco | Mk 3 | Repco 620 3.0 V8 | F | (Rhodesia) Sam Tingle | 1 |
| (United Kingdom) Rob Walker/Jack Durlacher Racing Team | Cooper-Maserati | T81 | Maserati 9/F1 3.0 V12 | F | (Switzerland) Jo Siffert | 1 |
| (United Kingdom) Rob Walker/Jack Durlacher Racing Team | Lotus-Ford | 49; 49B | Ford Cosworth DFV 3.0 V8 | F | (Switzerland) Jo Siffert | 2–12 |
| (Switzerland) Joakim Bonnier Racing Team | Cooper-Maserati | T81 | Maserati 9/F1 3.0 V12 | F G | (Sweden) Jo Bonnier | 1 |
| (Switzerland) Joakim Bonnier Racing Team | McLaren-BRM | M5A | BRM P101 3.0 V12 | F G | (Sweden) Jo Bonnier | 3–5, 7, 9–11 |
| (Switzerland) Joakim Bonnier Racing Team | Honda | RA301 | Honda RA301E 3.0 V12 | F G | (Sweden) Jo Bonnier | 12 |
| (South Africa) Scuderia Scribante | Brabham-Repco | BT11 | Repco 620 3.0 V8 | F | (South Africa) Dave Charlton | 1 |
| (South Africa) Team Pretoria | Brabham-Climax | BT11 | Climax FPF 2.8 L4 | F | (South Africa) Jackie Pretorius | 1 |
| (Rhodesia) John Love | Cooper-Climax | T79 | Climax FPF 2.8 L4 | D | (South Africa) Basil van Rooyen | 1 |
| (United Kingdom) Reg Parnell Racing | BRM | P126 | BRM P101 3.0 V12 | G | (United Kingdom) Piers Courage | 2–12 |
| (Switzerland) Charles Vögele Racing | Brabham-Repco | BT20 | Repco 620 3.0 V8 | G | (Switzerland) Silvio Moser | 3, 5, 7–9 |
| (West Germany) Caltex Racing Team | Brabham-Repco | BT24 | Repco 740 3.0 V8 | D | (West Germany) Kurt Ahrens Jr. | 8 |
| (West Germany) Bayerische Motoren Werke AG | Lola-BMW | T102 | BMW M12/1 1.6 L4 | D | (West Germany) Hubert Hahne | 8 |
| (United Kingdom) Bernard White Racing | BRM | P261 | BRM P101 3.0 V12 | G | (Australia) Frank Gardner | 9 |
| (Canada) Castrol Oils Ltd | Eagle-Climax | T1F | Climax FPF 2.8 L4 | G | (Canada) Al Pease | 10 |

=== Team and driver changes ===
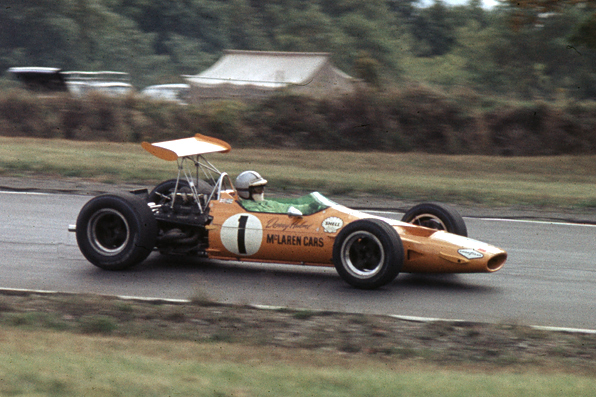
1967 champion Denny Hulme signed with McLaren.

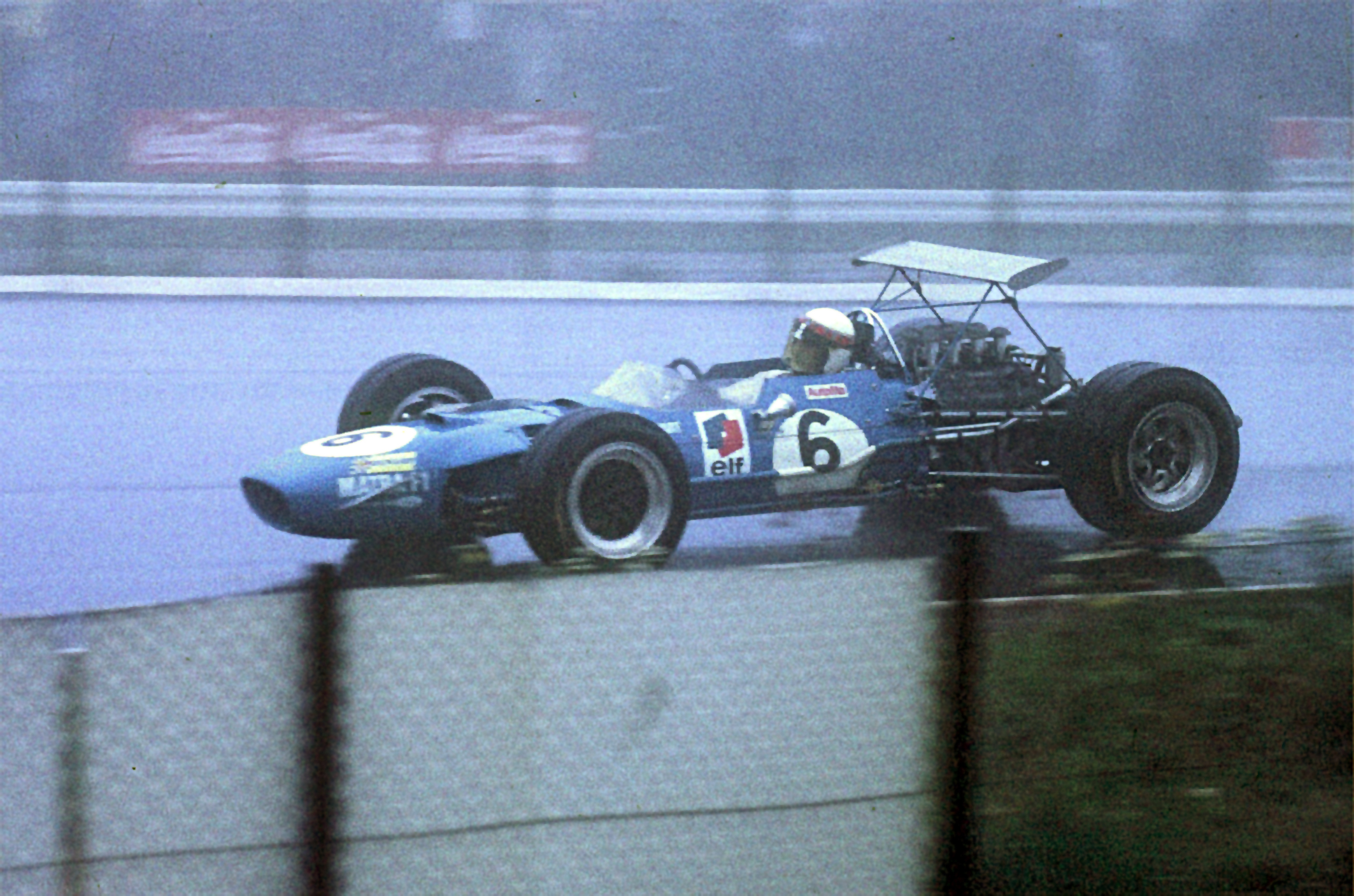
Jackie Stewart was signed by Ken Tyrrell in his new Matra team.

- After receiving offers from every team bar two, Jochen Rindt signed with 1967 champions Brabham.
- Reigning drivers' champion Denny Hulme moved to Bruce McLaren's team. (The two worked together in Can-Am and would dominate the series from 1967 to 1971.) After Lotus lost its exclusive right to use Cosworth DFV engines, McLaren also started using Cosworth instead of BRM.
- Scuderia Ferrari ran Chris Amon as their only full-time driver in 1967, but attracted Jacky Ickx for this year.
- Ken Tyrrell entered F1 with Matra International, a joint-venture between Tyrrell Racing and car manufacturer Matra. They signed 1967 BRM driver Jackie Stewart. Matra kept running their factory team as well, powered by their own V12s. BRM signed Pedro Rodríguez to replace Stewart.
- With Rindt, Ickx and Rodríguez gone, Cooper needed a complete new driver line-up, which they found in Formula Two driver Brian Redman and long-time Ferrari employee Ludovico Scarfiotti. The team switched from Maserati engines to take over McLaren's contract with BRM.

==== Mid-season changes ====
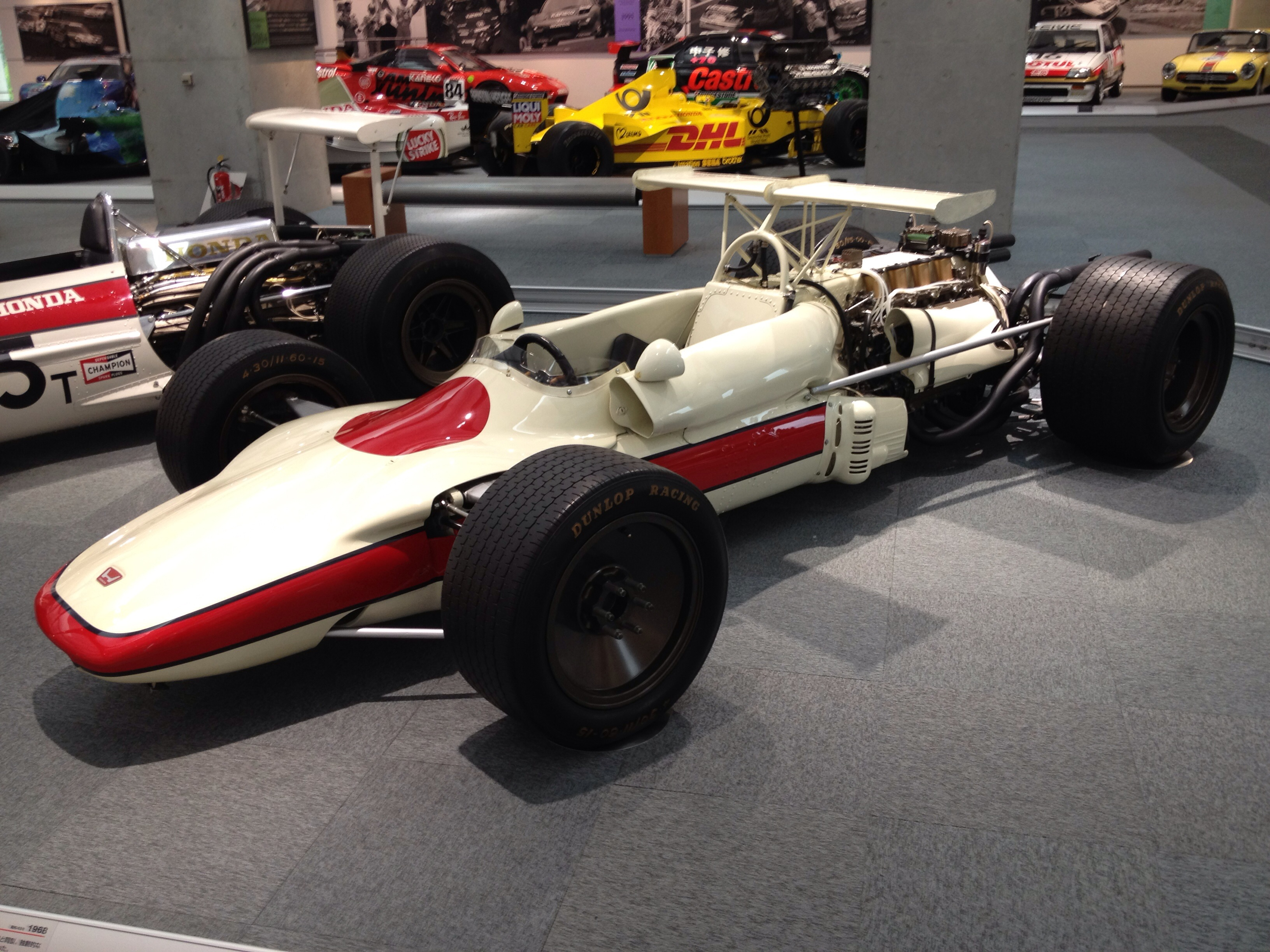
The second of two Honda RA302s; this one never raced, while the first was driven by Jo Schlesser in his fatal 1968 accident.

- Jim Clark was killed in a racing accident during the 1968 Deutschland Trophäe Formula Two race. Colin Chapman drew in F2 driver Jackie Oliver to fill the seat.
- Chapman lost his Indianapolis 500 driver Mike Spence when he crashed during practice for the 1968 event. In F1, Spence had been driving for BRM, who signed Richard Attwood to replace him for the majority of rounds. That year's Indy 500 winner, Bobby Unser, took the seat in Italy and the United States.
- Both of Cooper's drivers were involved in serious crashes: Redman exited the Belgian Grand Prix with a broken arm, while Scarfiotti would suffer a fatal crash at a hillclimbing race in Germany. The team then hired Lucien Bianchi and Vic Elford.
- Jo Schlesser was signed by Honda to drive the experimental air-cooled RA302, which works driver John Surtees had refused. In just his debut race, the French Grand Prix, local hero Schlesser crashed on the second lap. The fully-fueled car exploded instantly.
- Both Matra teams expanded to two cars near the end of the year. The French team promoted F2 driver Henri Pescarolo and the British team went for F3 driver Johnny Servoz-Gavin.
- Dan Gurney, founder and driver from Anglo American Racers, switched from his own Eagle chassis to a customer McLaren chassis, powered by a Cosworth DFV.

== Calendar ==
| Round | Grand Prix | Circuit | Date |
|---|---|---|---|
| 1 | South African Grand Prix | (South Africa) Kyalami Grand Prix Circuit, Midrand | 1 January |
| 2 | Spanish Grand Prix | (Spain) Circuito Permanente Del Jarama, Madrid | 12 May |
| 3 | Monaco Grand Prix | Circuit de Monaco, Monte Carlo | 26 May |
| 4 | Belgian Grand Prix | (Belgium) Circuit de Spa-Francorchamps, Stavelot | 9 June |
| 5 | Dutch Grand Prix | (Netherlands) Circuit Zandvoort, Zandvoort | 23 June |
| 6 | French Grand Prix | (France) Rouen-Les-Essarts, Orival | 7 July |
| 7 | British Grand Prix | (United Kingdom) Brands Hatch, West Kingsdown | 20 July |
| 8 | German Grand Prix | (West Germany) Nürburgring, Nürburg | 4 August |
| 9 | Italian Grand Prix | (Italy) Autodromo Nazionale di Monza, Monza | 8 September |
| 10 | Canadian Grand Prix | (Canada) Circuit Mont-Tremblant, Mont-Tremblant | 22 September |
| 11 | United States Grand Prix | (United States) Watkins Glen International, New York | 6 October |
| 12 | Mexican Grand Prix | Magdalena Mixhuca, Mexico City | 3 November |

=== Calendar changes ===
- The Spanish Grand Prix returned after a fourteen-year absence, hosted at Jarama near Madrid on 12 May.
- The Belgian and Dutch Grand Prix switched places, with F1 visiting Circuit de Spa-Francorchamps first this year.
- The French Grand Prix returned to Rouen-Les-Essarts after four years, replacing the Bugatti version of the Circuit de la Sarthe.
- The British Grand Prix was moved from Silverstone to Brands Hatch, in keeping with the event-sharing arrangement between the two circuits.
- The Canadian Grand Prix was moved from Mosport Park to the new Circuit Mont-Tremblant in Quebec. The two tracks started an agreement to alternately host the GP., The race was moved to September, behind the Italian Grand Prix.

== Regulation changes ==
=== Technical and safety regulations ===
Dan Gurney became the first driver to wear a full-face helmet at the 1968 German Grand Prix. He had helped to invent it with the Bell Helmets company and had already used it at the 1968 Indianapolis 500. Within some years, it became the obvious choice among drivers and was later deemed mandatory.

All cars had to be fitted with a rollbar that stretched out to at least 5 cm (2.0 in) above the driver's helmet, an electrical circuit breaker, an oil catch tank and a reverse gear. And the cockpit had to allow easy evacuation.

=== Other ===
The FIA decided to permit unrestricted sponsorship on cars after the withdrawal of support from automobile related firms like BP, Shell and Firestone. Team Gunston, a South African privateer team, was the first Formula One team to paint their cars in the livery of their sponsors when they entered a private Brabham for John Love, painted in the colours of Gunston cigarettes, in the 1968 South African Grand Prix. In the next round at the 1968 Spanish Grand Prix, Team Lotus, initially using the British racing green, became the first works team to follow this example, with Graham Hill's Lotus 49B entered in the red, gold and white colours of the Imperial Tobacco's Gold Leaf brand.

== Championship report ==
=== Early season ===
==== Round 1: South Africa ====
The fast and flowing Kyalami circuit between Johannesburg and Pretoria played host to the South African Grand Prix for the second time on New Year's Day 1968. Briton Jim Clark was fastest by a second with his Lotus-Ford/Cosworth teammate Graham Hill alongside him with Jackie Stewart in the new Matra-Ford/Cosworth completing the front row. On the second row there were the two Brabham-Repcos of Austrian Jochen Rindt and Australian Jack Brabham while the third row featured Briton John Surtees in the Honda and the Ferraris of Italian Andrea de Adamich (in a third car) and New Zealander Chris Amon. The race began with Stewart taking the lead from Clark while Hill dropped back to seventh behind Rindt, Surtees, Brabham and Amon. On the second lap, Clark took the lead while Brabham overtook Surtees and Hill passed both Amon and Surtees to run fifth. Further back there was drama when Italian Ludovico Scarfiotti's Cooper-Maserati suffered a water leak and the driver was scalded by the escaping hot water. He was taken to hospital with first degree burns. On the seventh lap, Brabham overtook Rindt for third place but soon afterwards he ran into engine trouble and dropped back, leaving Rindt third again. He came under threat from Hill and on lap 13 the Englishman moved to third place. Amon moved into fifth place having overtaken Surtees on the same lap. The order remained stable as Hill chased and caught Stewart and on lap 27 he moved ahead. Stewart stayed with him until Lap 43 of 80 when the Matra retired with a connecting rod failure. This moved Rindt to third once again and the order then remained unchanged all the way to the finish with Lotus scoring a dominant 1–2 finish with Rindt third. Clark won his 25th and last championship Grand Prix from teammate Graham Hill and Austrian Jochen Rindt in a Brabham. Clark broke Juan Manuel Fangio's 10 1/2 year record of 24 Grand Prix victories, and would go on to hold this record until his countryman and friend Jackie Stewart broke the record in 1973.

==== Gap between rounds 1 and 2 ====
Many F1 drivers in the 1960s went to compete in the Tasman series in New Zealand and Australia during the European winter and the Southern Hemisphere summer, which was a nine-week, eight-race series that started in early January and ended in late February/early March, with respective races every week in open wheel racing cars that were very similar to F1 cars of the time, with exactly the same chassis- only these variants had 2.5 litre engines, as opposed to Formula One world championship cars, which had 3 litre engines.

The non-championship Race of Champions at the English Brands Hatch circuit near London in March was won by Bruce McLaren in his own McLaren car, ahead of Mexican Pedro Rodriguez in a BRM and McLaren's teammate and countryman Denny Hulme.

The BRDC International Trophy race at the Silverstone circuit in England was another non-championship race held 5 weeks after the Race of Champions. The race was won by Hulme in a McLaren, ahead of fellow New Zealanders McLaren and Chris Amon in a Ferrari.

On 7 April, Jim Clark, one of the most successful and popular drivers of all time, was killed at Hockenheim in West Germany at a non-championship Formula Two event. The Scotsman had gone off the track caused by what was believed to be a deflating rear tire; 90% of the Hockenheim circuit was made up of two long, slightly curving straights running through thick forests. And because there was no protection from the solid trees lining the circuit on both sides, Clark's Lotus smashed into a wall of trees, breaking the Scotsman's neck and killing him instantly; the car was totally destroyed.

=== European summer ===
==== Round 2: Spain ====
There was a four-month gap between the South African Grand Prix in January and the Spanish Grand Prix in May. Formula One had lost yet another driver: Briton Mike Spence died after a practice accident at the Indianapolis Motor Speedway while running one of Andy Granatelli's Lotus turbines when he hit the wall at Turn One and one of the wheels came back into his cockpit and hit him on the head. The first Spanish Grand Prix since 1954 was held at the brand-new, ultra-modern Jarama circuit just north of the Spanish capital city of Madrid, having held a non-championship race in 1967, which Jim Clark won. Jackie Stewart had to miss this race due to a wrist injury; Amon took pole. In the race, Rodriguez took the lead from Frenchman Jean-Pierre Beltoise, Amon and Hulme. The top three remained unchanged in the early laps but on lap 12 Beltoise took the lead in his Matra-Ford. As he did so the Frenchman's car began smoking and on lap 16 he dropped out, leaving Amon (who had overtaken Rodriguez) in the lead. For the next 30 laps, the New Zealander was ahead while Rodriguez shadowed him until he lost control on lap 28 and crashed. This put Hill into second place with Hulme third and Surtees fourth. On lap 58, Amon's fuel pump failed and so Hill took the lead and went on to win from Hulme and his promising countryman Brian Redman in a Cooper-BRM.

==== Round 3: Monaco ====
It was only a year since Lorenzo Bandini had been killed at Monaco, so the chicane was tightened and the race was shortened by 20 laps. Ferrari did not attend amid reports that the team was not happy with the safety standards at the circuit. Team Lotus was there, however, and Graham Hill and Jackie Oliver ran in the new red and gold livery of Gold Leaf and the cars featured the first hints of aerodynamic front and rear wings. BRM had been planning to run Briton Chris Irwin as Mike Spence's replacement but in practice for the Nürburgring 1,000 km (620 mi) sportscar race the previous weekend Irwin had flipped an Alan Mann Ford F3L sportscar at the Flugplatz section and had suffered serious head injuries, Irwin never raced again. So, Reg Parnell Racing's Richard Attwood was promoted to the works team. Jackie Stewart was still out of action with a wrist injury from the Jarama F2 race a month earlier and so his place in the Matra International team was taken by F1 debutant Johnny Servoz-Gavin. Jean-Pierre Beltoise appeared with the new Matra V12 engine in the back of his Matra Sports entry. Brian Redman was busy racing for the Gulf John Wyer team at the Spa 1000 km sportscar race and his place with Cooper was taken by Belgian Lucien Bianchi. Denny Hulme was also being kept busy as he jetted backwards and forwards to Indianapolis qualifying. Qualifying at Monaco resulted in pole position by 0.6 seconds for Hill with an impressive Frenchman Johnny Servoz-Gavin alongside him on the front row. The second row featured Jo Siffert (in Rob Walker's Lotus) and John Surtees in the Honda with Brabham's Jochen Rindt and Attwood on the third row. Then came Bruce McLaren and Beltoise, Pedro Rodriguez (BRM) and Hulme. At the start Servoz-Gavin took the lead but after three laps he suffered a driveshaft failure and crashed. This left Hill in the lead and there he stayed for the rest of the afternoon. The first few laps saw a number of accident with Oliver and McLaren colliding on the first lap, Jochen Rindt (Brabham) crashing on lap nine while trying to pass Surtees. Brabham, Dan Gurney and Siffert all went out with mechanical trouble while Beltoise broke his suspension running over a curb and Piers Courage (Reg Parnell Racing BRM) stopped because his car was handling so badly. Surtees then disappeared with a gearbox failure and on the same lap Rodriguez crashed and so only five cars were left by the end of lap 16. As a result, the excitement was limited although third placed Hulme stopped in the mid-race to have a driveshaft replaced and dropped to fifth, leaving Bianchi to finish third behind Hill and Attwood with Ludovico Scarfiotti fourth in the second Cooper-BRM.

==== Round 4: Belgium ====
Formula One arrived at the fastest circuit of the year: the notoriously dangerous and challenging 14 km (8.7 mi) Spa-Francorchamps circuit in Belgium. Amon took pole at an average speed of more than 240 km/h (150 mph) around this unprotected rural road circuit, an incredible average speed by even today's standards. The appearance of wings on the Lotus at Monaco did not go unnoticed and for this race, various teams arrived with experimental wings on their cars. Ferrari was back in action having missed Monaco and entered two cars for Chris Amon and Jacky Ickx. Jackie Stewart was back in action for Ken Tyrrell's Matra International team and Lucien Bianchi stayed with the Cooper-BRM team, replacing Ludovico Scarfiotti, as the Italian was committed to racing in the European Hillclimb Championship event at Rossfeld in southern Germany in a Porsche 908. American Dan Gurney and Kiwi Denny Hulme had flown back from Indianapolis having finished second and fourth in the race. Amon was fastest in practice on Friday with Stewart and Ickx alongside him on the front row. Then came John Surtees in the Honda and Hulme with Bruce McLaren, Piers Courage (Reg Parnell Racing BRM) and Pedro Rodriguez (BRM) sharing the third row. Both Lotus drivers had trouble and were on the penultimate row of the grid. Saturday was completely ruined by rain and by the news from Rossfeld that Scarfiotti had been killed. The Italian Scarfiotti was the third Grand Prix driver to die in 2 months, this was turning into the bloodiest year in the history of Grand Prix racing since its origins in the 1900s. Race day was dull and overcast and at the start Amon took the lead with Ickx, Surtees and Hulme chasing him. By the end of the second lap Surtees had taken the lead. There were a rash of retirements early on with Hill, Richard Attwood (BRM), Brabham and Rindt all going out with mechanical trouble. On the seventh lap, Briton Brian Redman (Cooper-BRM) went out when his suspension failed near Les Combes and he crashed violently into a concrete barrier, then went over the barrier and into a parked Ford Cortina road car. The Cooper caught fire but Redman escaped with a badly broken right arm and a few minor burns- he did not race for most of that year. Soon afterwards Amon went out with a radiator problem and then the leader Surtees disappeared when his suspension failed. This left Hulme in the lead but he was quickly overtaken by Stewart and the two diced until Hulme slowed with a driveshaft problem. This left Stewart half a minute clear of McLaren but on the penultimate lap the Matra-Ford driver ran out of petrol and dropped behind McLaren, Rodriguez and Ickx. This was the McLaren team's first ever championship F1 victory, and Bruce McLaren's first championship Grand Prix victory since the 1962 Monaco Grand Prix. Bruce also became only the third driver to win a race in a car manufactured by his own team – Jack Brabham having done it in 1966 and Dan Gurney in 1967 at Spa-Francorchamps.

==== Round 5: The Netherlands ====
The traditional home for the Dutch Grand Prix was the fast beach-side Zandvoort circuit near Amsterdam. The Brabham team had its new Repco V8 engine ready and was running a third car for Dan Gurney who had no Weslake engines available for his Eagle. Cooper ran only one car for Lucien Bianchi following the death of Scarfiotti and Brian Redman's accident at Spa a fortnight earlier. In qualifying Chris Amon was fastest in his Ferrari with Jochen Rindt's Brabham and Graham Hill's Lotus sharing the front row. Jack Brabham was on the second row with Jackie Stewart, while the third row featured Belgian Jacky Ickx in a Ferrari, Hulme, and McLaren. The weather was bad all weekend and it was raining lightly at the start. Rindt took the lead but he was in third place by the end of the first lap, behind Hill and Stewart. The rain intensified and on lap four Stewart moved into the lead. He quickly built up a big lead while Hill came under pressure from Beltoise who had moved quickly through the midfield. On lap 23, Beltoise went off and had to pit to clear his throttle of sand and so he dropped back to seventh. When he re-joined he quickly moved up the field, passing Gurney, Ickx, Amon and Rodriguez to get to third place. On lap 50, he overtook Hill for second place. On lap 61, Hill had a spin and dropped to fourth behind Rodriguez. On lap 82, he did it again but this time had to retire. Stewart won his first Grand Prix for more than two years from Beltoise to give Matra chassis a 1–2 result with Rodriguez third for BRM. Ickx was fourth for Ferrari while the Swiss Silvio Moser survived to finish fifth in his private Brabham, although he was three laps behind the winner.

==== Round 6: France ====
After races at Clermont-Ferrand, Reims and the short Le Mans circuit in 1965, 1966 and 1967 respectively, the French GP returned to the spectacular and dangerous 4-mile (6.4-km) Rouen-Les-Essarts rural road circuit in a forested and hilly area of northern France. This circuit was very fast, narrow and was littered with high-speed sweepers, including a section of fast, anti-banked downhill curves; and two brick-surfaced hairpins at the ends of the track. An all-French team in the form of an Alpine-Renault Grand Prix car was expected to make its debut at its home race, but never materialised, due to its engine lacking 100 brake horsepower compared to the opposition, leading to Renault killing the project. The entry was little changed from the field which had raced in the wet at Zandvoort two weeks earlier with the one exception being the new Honda RA302 car with an air-cooled V8 engine- this new Honda was an experimental research and development car. This had been tested by John Surtees who declined to race it, as he felt it was not suitable for racing. The company founder, Soichiro Honda, was visiting France to try to boost European sales and so it was decided that the car should be entered by Honda France for the popular 40-year-old French racer Jo Schlesser, who had competed in two previous GPs in F2 Matras. Cooper fielded Briton Vic Elford and Matra's Johnny Servoz-Gavin to replace the late Ludovico Scarfiotti and the injured Brian Redman while Dan Gurney was missing because of a lack of engines for his Eagle. Qualifying saw Jackie Oliver walk away from a 125 mph (201 km/h) accident which heavily damaged his Lotus. The car could not be repaired in time and so Oliver was forced to miss the rest of the meeting. Jochen Rindt set the fastest time in qualifying in his Brabham with Jackie Stewart's Matra-Ford and Jacky Ickx's Ferrari sharing the front row of the grid. Hulme and Amon shared the second row while Bruce McLaren (McLaren), Surtees (Honda) and Jean-Pierre Beltoise (Matra) made up row three. Championship leader Graham Hill was ninth. Light rain was falling when the race began but most of the drivers decided to start on intermediate tires. The exception was Ickx who chose full wets. As a result, the Belgian was in the lead at the end of the first lap. Stewart and Rindt were battling over second place with Surtees fourth. On the third lap at the notorious Six-Frere's corner, which was one of the anti-banked sweepers after the start Schlesser lost control of the R&D Honda and crashed. The car went up the embankment there, overturned and caught fire. The full fuel tank and magnesium chassis burned so intensely that nothing could be done to save Schlesser. The fire burned all over the track, and the drivers were forced to take evasive action at such a high speed part of the circuit. He became the fourth F1 driver to die that season (after Jim Clark, Mike Spence and Ludovico Scarfiotti). But the race went on anyway. Rindt suffered a puncture from wreckage at the scene of the crash and had to pit, dropping to the back of the field. Surtees has moved ahead of Stewart and so ran second until he was overtaken by Rodriguez on lap seven. Further back, Hill overtook Stewart for fourth place but then retired with a driveshaft failure. Ickx went off on lap 19 and dropped behind Rodriguez and Surtees but he caught and repassed both men within two laps and stayed ahead for the rest of the afternoon to score his first ever victory, in only his ninth Grand Prix. Rodriguez had to pit with gearbox problems and he dropped away, leaving Surtees second (although the Honda driver also stopped to replace broken goggles). Third place went to Stewart with Cooper-BRM driver Vic Elford fourth on his Grand Prix debut.

==== Round 7: Britain ====
The dreadful 1968 season continued on as Graham Hill arrived at Brands Hatch with a big lead in the World Championship and with seven other British drivers in the 20-car field, there was plenty for the fans to cheer. The only major change from the miserable French GP (where Honda driver Jo Schlesser had been killed) was the arrival in the Cooper-BRM team of Robin Widdows. The cars had sprouted increasingly dramatic rear wings in an effort to get as much downforce as possible. Qualifying showed that Team Lotus was dominant with Hill fastest by half a second and Jackie Oliver alongside him. Chris Amon completed the front row in his Ferrari. On the second row, Jo Siffert (Rob Walker Lotus) lined up alongside Jochen Rindt's Brabham while the third row featured Dan Gurney (back in action after missing several races in his Eagle-Weslake because of engine problems), Jackie Stewart in Ken Tyrrell's Matra-Ford and Jack Brabham's Brabham. There was light rain at the start (for the third consecutive race) and Oliver took the lead from Hill and Siffert. The leading Lotus was trailing smoke and on the fourth lap Oliver was overtaken by Hill. Despite the smoke trail, Oliver remained second. However, on the 27th lap, Hill went out with a rear suspension failure and so Oliver went back into the lead. Behind him, Siffert fought for second place with Amon but gradually the Lotus driver moved away. On lap 44, Oliver came to a halt with a transmission failure and so Siffert inherited the lead and went on to win his first ever Grand Prix and Rob Walker's first victory in seven years. The Ferraris of Amon and Ickx came home second and third.

==== Round 8: Germany ====
After Jo Siffert's unexpected victory for Rob Walker at Brands Hatch, the F1 teams headed off to the most challenging circuit of the year: the 14.2 mi (22.9 km) Nürburgring and more bad weather, the previous four races having all been affected by rain. The field was much as normal with the only major additions being German Kurt Ahrens, driving a third Brabham and German Hubert Hahne entered in a BMW-entered Lola-BMW Formula 2 car, the Munich manufacturer having a look at the state of competitiveness in F1. It rained throughout practice and Jacky Ickx took pole position in his Ferrari by a full 10 seconds with Chris Amon (Ferrari) second and Jochen Rindt third in his Brabham. Graham Hill was on the second row in his Lotus, alongside the Cooper-BRM of Vic Elford. The third row featured Jackie Stewart's Matra-Ford, John Surtees in the Honda and Piers Courage in a Reg Parnell Racing BRM. At the start of the race–in pouring rain—Hill took the lead from Amon, Rindt and Stewart. In the course of the first lap however, Stewart moved to the front and built a nine-second lead, using his Dunlop wet tires to maximum effect. By the end of the second lap, his lead was out to 34 seconds and after 14 laps he was over four minutes ahead of second-placed Graham Hill, who spun at one point but was able to get out of the car, push it back into the right direction and get it restarted before Rindt arrived, third-placed Amon having spun off earlier on the same lap. Hill managed to keep Rindt behind him third, while fourth place fell to Ickx. Stewart later referred to this race as his greatest Grand Prix victory.

The Gold Cup non-championship race at the Oulton Park circuit near Manchester, England attracted some of the big names and victory went to Jackie Stewart in his Matra-Ford.

==== Round 9: Italy ====
There was a five-week gap in the World Championship calendar between the German and Italian Grands Prix and after a season of rainfall and tragedy the F1 circus was able to take a break. The entry at the Monza Autodrome near Milan was the biggest of the season with American driver Mario Andretti entered in a third Lotus and his USAC rival Bobby Unser replacing Richard Attwood in the BRM team. Ken Tyrrell's Matra International has expanded to run two cars the second being driven by Johnny Servoz-Gavin. Ferrari ran a third car for rising British star Derek Bell while Honda fielded a second RA301 for David Hobbs. Cooper had been planning to run three cars but Robin Widdows was out of action after an accident and so the team ran only Vic Elford and Lucien Bianchi. Early qualifying saw Andretti and Unser setting fast times as both wanted to fly back to the United States to participate in the Indiana State Fairgrounds Hoosier Hundred the following day. They then intended to fly back across the Atlantic and race in the Grand Prix. The organisers announced that if the two drivers did fly back to the United States and race in the Hoosier Hundred, there they would be banned from competing in the Italian race under a rule which forbade drivers to compete in another event within 24 hours of the start of the Grand Prix. They flew off back to Indiana for the dirt race and did not return. Qualifying resulted in John Surtees taking pole his Honda with Bruce McLaren (McLaren) and Chris Amon (Ferrari) alongside him. The second row was shared by Jacky Ickx's Ferrari and Graham Hill's Lotus while Jackie Stewart shared the third row with Denny Hulme (McLaren) and Bell's Ferrari. For the first time in months, a championship Grand Prix took place in sunny conditions with Surtees taking the lead at the start. McLaren was ahead by the time the cars returned at the end of the first lap. McLaren stayed ahead until lap seven when Surtees slipstreamed into the lead. The following lap McLaren was ahead again while Amon crashed and Surtees also hit the wall trying to avoid the Ferrari. This put Siffert into second place with Stewart third. Stewart then moved to second and a slipstreaming battle developed for the lead between McLaren, Stewart, Siffert and Hulme. Hill disappeared when a wheel fell off his Lotus. McLaren dropped out when he had to pit for more oil on lap 35. Stewart was the next to disappear with engine failure on lap 43 and when Siffert went out with a rear suspension failure of lap 59, Hulme was left to win. There had been a lively battle behind the leaders between Servoz-Gavin, Ickx and Rindt. Ickx had emerged ahead but in the closing laps had to stop for more fuel and so dropped to third behind Servoz-Gavin, Rindt having gone out with an engine failure.

=== North American trilogy ===
==== Round 10: Canada ====
After the successful Canadian GP at Mosport Park near Toronto the previous year, the event was given a more reasonable date in the 1968 calendar, but the race was moved to the exciting Mont Tremblant circuit at St Jovite, in Quebec, one and a half hours northwest of Montreal. With the final three races being held in North America, traveling was also reduced. Attention now centred on the battle for the World Championship with Graham Hill still ahead after his early season successes with 30 points by Jacky Ickx with 27, Jackie Stewart with 26 and Denny Hulme with 24. Lotus ran a third car for Canadian star Bill Brack, while Dan Gurney ran in a third McLaren (having given up with his Eagle-Weslake program). An old Eagle appeared in the hands of local driver Al Pease while BRM ran only one car for Pedro Rodriguez. Matra Sports expanded to a two-car operation Jean-Pierre Beltoise being joined by Henri Pescarolo and with Jackie Stewart running alongside Johnny Servoz-Gavin in the Matra International entries, there were four Matras in the field. In qualifying Ickx's hopes of the World title ended when he crashed after his throttle stuck open. He suffered a broken leg. Jochen Rindt took pole position for Brabham—the new Repco engine finally beginning to work—with Chris Amon's Ferrari and Jo Siffert's Rob Walker Lotus alongside on the front row. Gurney did well to qualify on the second row alongside Hill, while the third row featured Hulme (McLaren), John Surtees (Honda) and Bruce McLaren (McLaren). At the start Amon took the lead with Siffert chasing him. Then came Rindt, Gurney and Hill. The order at the front remained stable with Surtees dropping out early from eighth place. On lap 14, Hill managed to pass Gurney and 12 laps later Gurney dropped away with a broken radiator. On lap 29 of 90, Siffert disappeared with an oil leak and so Rindt was second but he retired soon afterwards with an engine failure which promoted Hill to second place. That too was short-lived as Hill soon dropped behind Hulme and McLaren because of a serious vibration problem. Hill gradually fell back and was overtaken by Rodriguez and Servoz-Gavin. A few laps later the Frenchman spun out and so Hill moved back to fourth. Amon seemed to have everything under control until the 73rd lap when his Ferrari's transmission failed. This gave McLaren a 1–2 victory with Rodriguez grabbing third for BRM. The result put Hulme and Hill equal in points in the World Championship with two races to go.

==== Round 11: United States ====
There were some additions to the usual F1 field at the small Watkins Glen circuit in up-state New York with Team Lotus running a third car for Mario Andretti (who had practiced but not raced for the team in Italy) and Bobby Unser who has suffered a similar fate at Monza in the second BRM. McLaren again ran a third car for Dan Gurney while Ferrari replaced Ickx (who had broken his leg in practice for the Canadian GP) with Derek Bell. Things did not begin well for Unser who did serious damage to his BRM in the first session. On Saturday however, Mario Andretti gave everyone a surprise when he put his Lotus on pole position, ahead of Jackie Stewart's Matra. On the second row was Graham Hill in his Lotus and Chris Amon's Ferrari while World Championship hopeful Denny Hulme (who was equal on points with Hill after his win in Canada a fortnight earlier) was on the third row alongside Jochen Rindt's Brabham. Jack Oliver suffered a wheel failure and crashed the second Lotus heavily. Henri Pescarolo was also a nonstarter when his Matra V12 blew up. A big crowd gathered in the hope that Andretti would be able to beat the F1 regulars and at the start Mario edged into the lead although Stewart overtook him before the end of the first lap. Amon was able to get into third ahead of Hill while Hulme moved quickly up to fifth place. The order remained stable for the first few laps and then Amon spun and dropped back. On lap 14 of 108, Andretti's Lotus was dragging part of the bodywork and he was forced to pit and dropped to the tail of the field. He began to fight back but eventually retired with clutch failure. More significantly, however, Hulme spun on oil and had to pit to have a damaged brake pipe fixed. He eventually re-joined, aiming to pick up points but suffered a driveshaft failure in the closing laps and crashed. This left Stewart and Hill untroubled at the front and Gurney running third. He dropped behind Surtees after a spin but recovered to retake the position. In the final minutes of the race, Gurney had a puncture and so Surtees took third place after all. The result was a boost to Graham Hill who moved six point clear of Hulme in the World Championship race although Stewart's win put him only three points behind Hill. So it would be a three-way fight for the title in Mexico a month later. This would be the last time three British drivers would share the podium until the 2026 Barcelona-Catalunya Grand Prix.

==== Round 12: Mexico ====
The final round of the championship in Mexico was moved back 2 weeks because of the 1968 Mexico City Summer Olympics having taken place only 3 weeks previously. When the F1 teams finally arrived at the high-altitude Magadelena Mixhuca Park circuit in Mexico City for the final round of the World Championship four weeks after Watkins Glen, Graham Hill had 39 points, Jackie Stewart had 36 and Denny Hulme had 33. All the contenders were overshadowed in qualifying by the Swiss Jo Siffert in Rob Walker's Lotus 49 who took pole position with Chris Amon's Ferrari second. Hill and Hulme shared the second row while Dan Gurney (in the third McLaren) was alongside John Surtees's Honda on the third row. Stewart was on row four with Jack Brabham's Brabham. For the occasion, the third Lotus was driven by Moises Solana, who out-qualified Lotus driver Jack Oliver after the Essex driver had a spin. At the start of the race neither man on the front well got away well and it was Hill who took the lead although he was overtaken at the first corner by the fast-starting Surtees. Hill re-took the lead later in the lap and was clear by the end of the lap. Stewart had moved to third ahead of Amon, Hulme, Pedro Rodriguez (BRM) and Jochen Rindt (Brabham). In the early laps, the order switched around considerably. Surtees dropped back through the field as his engine overheated and Rindt disappeared with an ignition problem. Jacky Ickx was back in action in his Ferrari after missing the US Grand Prix because of a leg injury but his race was also short-lived because of an ignition failure. Stewart took the lead for several laps but Hill passed him again while Hulme ran third until his car began to handle oddly and Siffert overtook him. Hulme retired on lap 11, when a rear suspension failure sent him into a guardrail, bringing to an end his World Championship challenge. It was now a straight fight between Hill and Stewart although Siffert decided to get in on the act and took the lead on lap 22. He then had to pit with a broken throttle cable and so it was Hill and Stewart again at the front. They were well clear of third-placed Brabham. And then Stewart began to drop back quickly with a fuel feed problem. The engine began to misfire and the handling also went awry. On lap 51, McLaren and Brabham both overtook him (the New Zealander having overtaken the Australian earlier). Brabham's race ended soon afterwards with an engine problem and as Johnny Servoz-Gavin also went out with an engine problem it was left to Oliver to take third place behind Hill and McLaren. Stewart ended up back in seventh position. Hill was World Champion for the second time.

== Results and standings ==
=== Grands Prix ===
| Round | Grand Prix | Pole position | Fastest lap | Winning driver | Winning constructor | Tyre | Report |
|---|---|---|---|---|---|---|---|
| 1 | (South Africa) South African Grand Prix | (United Kingdom) Jim Clark | (United Kingdom) Jim Clark | (United Kingdom) Jim Clark | (United Kingdom) Lotus-Ford | F | Report |
| 2 | (Spain) Spanish Grand Prix | (New Zealand) Chris Amon | (France) Jean-Pierre Beltoise | (United Kingdom) Graham Hill | (United Kingdom) Lotus-Ford | F | Report |
| 3 | Monaco Grand Prix | (United Kingdom) Graham Hill | (United Kingdom) Richard Attwood | (United Kingdom) Graham Hill | (United Kingdom) Lotus-Ford | F | Report |
| 4 | (Belgium) Belgian Grand Prix | (New Zealand) Chris Amon | (United Kingdom) John Surtees | (New Zealand) Bruce McLaren | (United Kingdom) McLaren-Ford | G | Report |
| 5 | (Netherlands) Dutch Grand Prix | (New Zealand) Chris Amon | (France) Jean-Pierre Beltoise | (United Kingdom) Jackie Stewart | (France) Matra-Ford | D | Report |
| 6 | (France) French Grand Prix | (Austria) Jochen Rindt | (Mexico) Pedro Rodríguez | (Belgium) Jacky Ickx | (Italy) Ferrari | F | Report |
| 7 | (United Kingdom) British Grand Prix | (United Kingdom) Graham Hill | (Switzerland) Jo Siffert | (Switzerland) Jo Siffert | (United Kingdom) Lotus-Ford | F | Report |
| 8 | (West Germany) German Grand Prix | (Belgium) Jacky Ickx | (United Kingdom) Jackie Stewart | (United Kingdom) Jackie Stewart | (France) Matra-Ford | D | Report |
| 9 | (Italy) Italian Grand Prix | (United Kingdom) John Surtees | (United Kingdom) Jackie Oliver | (New Zealand) Denny Hulme | (United Kingdom) McLaren-Ford | G | Report |
| 10 | (Canada) Canadian Grand Prix | (Austria) Jochen Rindt | (Switzerland) Jo Siffert | (New Zealand) Denny Hulme | (United Kingdom) McLaren-Ford | G | Report |
| 11 | United States Grand Prix | (United States) Mario Andretti | (United Kingdom) Jackie Stewart | (United Kingdom) Jackie Stewart | (France) Matra-Ford | D | Report |
| 12 | (Mexico) Mexican Grand Prix | (Switzerland) Jo Siffert | (Switzerland) Jo Siffert | (United Kingdom) Graham Hill | (United Kingdom) Lotus-Ford | F | Report |

=== Scoring system ===
Points were awarded to the top six classified finishers. The International Cup for F1 Manufacturers only counted the points of the highest-finishing driver for each race. For both the Championship and the Cup, the best five results from rounds 1-6 and the best five results from rounds 7-12 were counted.

Numbers without parentheses are championship points; numbers in parentheses are total points scored. Points were awarded in the following system:

| Position | 1st | 2nd | 3rd | 4th | 5th | 6th |
|---|---|---|---|---|---|---|
| Race | 9 | 6 | 4 | 3 | 2 | 1 |

=== World Drivers' Championship standings ===
| Pos. | Driver | RSA (South Africa) | ESP (Spain) | MON (Monaco) | BEL (Belgium) | NED (Netherlands) | FRA (France) | GBR (United Kingdom) | GER (West Germany) | ITA (Italy) | CAN (Canada) | USA (United States) | MEX (Mexico) | Pts. |
|---|---|---|---|---|---|---|---|---|---|---|---|---|---|---|
| 1 | (United Kingdom) Graham Hill | 2 | 1 | 1^{P} | Ret | 9 | Ret | Ret^{P} | 2 | Ret | 4 | 2 | 1 | 48 |
| 2 | (United Kingdom) Jackie Stewart | Ret | | | 4 | 1 | 3 | 6 | 1^{F} | Ret | 6 | 1^{F} | 7 | 36 |
| 3 | (New Zealand) Denny Hulme | 5 | 2 | 5 | Ret | Ret | 5 | 4 | 7 | 1 | 1 | Ret | Ret | 33 |
| 4 | (Belgium) Jacky Ickx | Ret | Ret | | 3 | 4 | 1 | 3 | 4^{P} | 3 | DNS | | Ret | 27 |
| 5 | (New Zealand) Bruce McLaren | | Ret | Ret | 1 | Ret | 8 | 7 | 13 | Ret | 2 | 6 | 2 | 22 |
| 6 | (Mexico) Pedro Rodríguez | Ret | Ret | Ret | 2 | 3 | NC^{F} | Ret | 6 | Ret | 3 | Ret | 4 | 18 |
| 7 | (Switzerland) Jo Siffert | 7 | Ret | Ret | 7 | Ret | 11 | 1^{F} | Ret | Ret | Ret^{F} | 5 | 6^{P}^{F} | 12 |
| 8 | (United Kingdom) John Surtees | 8 | Ret | Ret | Ret^{F} | Ret | 2 | 5 | Ret | Ret^{P} | Ret | 3 | Ret | 12 |
| 9 | (France) Jean-Pierre Beltoise | 6 | 5^{F} | Ret | 8 | 2^{F} | 9 | Ret | Ret | 5 | Ret | Ret | Ret | 11 |
| 10 | (New Zealand) Chris Amon | 4 | Ret^{P} | | Ret^{P} | 6^{P} | 10 | 2 | Ret | Ret | Ret | Ret | Ret | 10 |
| 11 | (United Kingdom) Jim Clark | 1^{P}^{F} | | | | | | | | | | | | 9 |
| 12 | (Austria) Jochen Rindt | 3 | Ret | Ret | Ret | Ret | Ret^{P} | Ret | 3 | Ret | Ret^{P} | Ret | Ret | 8 |
| 13 | (United Kingdom) Richard Attwood | | | 2^{F} | Ret | 7 | 7 | Ret | 14 | | | | | 6 |
| 14 | (France) Johnny Servoz-Gavin | | | Ret | | | Ret | | | 2 | Ret | | Ret | 6 |
| 15 | (United Kingdom) Jackie Oliver | | | Ret | 5 | NC | DNS | Ret | 11 | Ret^{F} | Ret | DNS | 3 | 6 |
| 16 | (Italy) Ludovico Scarfiotti | Ret | 4 | 4 | | | | | | | | | | 6 |
| 17 | (Belgium) Lucien Bianchi | | | 3 | 6 | Ret | | | Ret | | NC | NC | Ret | 5 |
| 18 | (United Kingdom) Vic Elford | | | | | | 4 | Ret | Ret | Ret | 5 | Ret | 8 | 5 |
| 19 | (United Kingdom) Brian Redman | Ret | 3 | | Ret | | | | | | | | | 4 |
| 20 | (United Kingdom) Piers Courage | | Ret | Ret | Ret | Ret | 6 | 8 | 8 | 4 | Ret | Ret | Ret | 4 |
| 21 | (United States) Dan Gurney | Ret | | Ret | | Ret | | Ret | 9 | Ret | Ret | 4 | Ret | 3 |
| 22 | (Sweden) Jo Bonnier | Ret | | DNQ | Ret | 8 | | Ret | | 6 | Ret | NC | 5 | 3 |
| 23 | (Australia) Jack Brabham | Ret | DNS | Ret | Ret | Ret | Ret | Ret | 5 | Ret | Ret | Ret | 10 | 2 |
| 24 | (Switzerland) Silvio Moser | | | DNQ | | 5 | | NC | DNS | DNQ | | | | 2 |
| — | (France) Henri Pescarolo | | | | | | | | | | Ret | DNS | 9 | 0 |
| — | (Rhodesia) John Love | 9 | | | | | | | | | | | | 0 |
| — | (West Germany) Hubert Hahne | | | | | | | | 10 | | | | | 0 |
| — | (West Germany) Kurt Ahrens Jr. | | | | | | | | 12 | | | | | 0 |
| — | (South Africa) Jackie Pretorius | NC | | | | | | | | | | | | 0 |
| — | (United Kingdom) Derek Bell | | | | | | | | | Ret | | Ret | | 0 |
| — | (United States) Mario Andretti | | | | | | | | | DNS | | Ret^{P} | | 0 |
| — | (United States) Bobby Unser | | | | | | | | | DNS | | Ret | | 0 |
| — | (Italy) Andrea de Adamich | Ret | | | | | | | | | | | | 0 |
| — | (South Africa) Dave Charlton | Ret | | | | | | | | | | | | 0 |
| — | (United Kingdom) Mike Spence | Ret | | | | | | | | | | | | 0 |
| — | (South Africa) Basil van Rooyen | Ret | | | | | | | | | | | | 0 |
| — | (Rhodesia) Sam Tingle | Ret | | | | | | | | | | | | 0 |
| — | (France) Jo Schlesser | | | | | | Ret | | | | | | | 0 |
| — | (United Kingdom) Robin Widdows | | | | | | | Ret | | | | | | 0 |
| — | (United Kingdom) David Hobbs | | | | | | | | | Ret | | | | 0 |
| — | (Canada) Bill Brack | | | | | | | | | | Ret | | | 0 |
| — | (Mexico) Moisés Solana | | | | | | | | | | | | Ret | 0 |
| — | (Canada) Al Pease | | | | | | | | | | DNS | | | 0 |
| — | (Australia) Frank Gardner | | | | | | | | | DNQ | | | | 0 |
| Pos. | Driver | RSA (South Africa) | ESP (Spain) | MON (Monaco) | BEL (Belgium) | NED (Netherlands) | FRA (France) | GBR (United Kingdom) | GER (West Germany) | ITA (Italy) | CAN (Canada) | USA (United States) | MEX (Mexico) | Pts. |

Key
| Colour | Result |
|---|---|
| Gold | Winner |
| Silver | Second place |
| Bronze | Third place |
| Green | Other points position |
| Blue | Other classified position |
| Blue | Not classified, finished (NC) |
| Purple | Not classified, retired (Ret) |
| Red | Did not qualify (DNQ) |
| Black | Disqualified (DSQ) |
| White | Did not start (DNS) |
| White | Race cancelled (C) |
| Blank | Did not practice (DNP) |
| Blank | Excluded (EX) |
| Blank | Did not arrive (DNA) |
| Blank | Withdrawn (WD) |
| Blank | Did not enter (empty cell) |
| Annotation | Meaning |
| P | Pole position |
| F | Fastest lap |

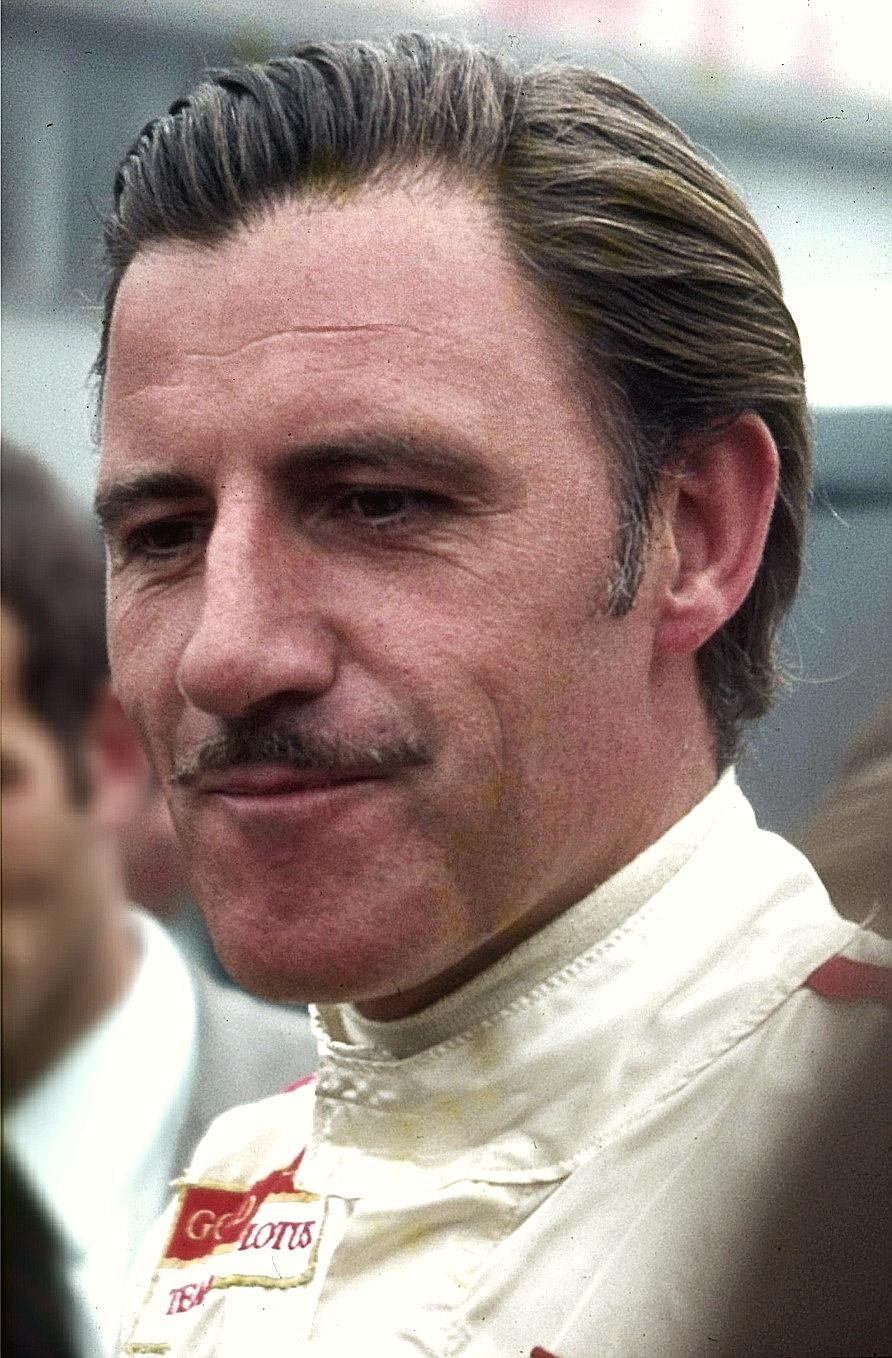
Graham Hill (pictured in 1969) won his 2nd and last Drivers' Championship, driving for Lotus

=== International Cup for F1 Manufacturers standings ===
| Pos. | Manufacturer | RSA (South Africa) | ESP (Spain) | MON (Monaco) | BEL (Belgium) | NED (Netherlands) | FRA (France) | GBR (United Kingdom) | GER (West Germany) | ITA (Italy) | CAN (Canada) | USA (United States) | MEX (Mexico) | Pts. |
|---|---|---|---|---|---|---|---|---|---|---|---|---|---|---|
| 1 | (United Kingdom) Lotus-Ford | 1 | 1 | 1 | 5 | 9 | 11 | 1 | 2 | Ret | 4 | 2 | 1 | 62 |
| 2 | (United Kingdom) McLaren-Ford | | 2 | 5 | 1 | Ret | 5 | 4 | 7 | 1 | 1 | 4 | 2 | 49 |
| 3 | (France) Matra-Ford | 6 | 5 | Ret | 4 | 1 | 3 | 6 | 1 | 2 | 6 | 1 | 7 | 45 |
| 4 | (Italy) Ferrari | 4 | Ret | | 3 | 4 | 1 | 2 | 4 | 3 | Ret | Ret | Ret | 32 |
| 5 | (United Kingdom) BRM | Ret | Ret | 2 | 2 | 3 | 6 | 8 | 6 | 4 | 3 | Ret | 4 | 28 |
| 6 | (Japan) Honda | 8 | Ret | Ret | Ret | Ret | 2 | 5 | Ret | Ret | Ret | 3 | 5 | 14 |
| 7 | (United Kingdom) Cooper-BRM | | 3 | 3 | 6 | Ret | 4 | Ret | Ret | Ret | 5 | NC | 8 | 14 |
| 8 | (United Kingdom) Brabham-Repco | 3 | Ret | Ret | Ret | 5 | Ret | Ret | 3 | Ret | Ret | Ret | 10 | 10 |
| 9 | (France) Matra | | | Ret | 8 | 2 | 9 | Ret | Ret | 5 | Ret | Ret | 9 | 8 |
| 10 | (United Kingdom) McLaren-BRM | 5 | WD | DNQ | Ret | 8 | | Ret | WD | 6 | Ret | NC | DNS | 3 |
| — | (United Kingdom) Cooper-Maserati | 7 | | | | | | WD | | | | | | 0 |
| — | (United States) Eagle-Weslake | Ret | | Ret | WD | | WD | Ret | 9 | Ret | | | | 0 |
| — | (United Kingdom) Lola-BMW | | | | | | | | 10 | | | | | 0 |
| — | (United Kingdom) Brabham-Climax | NC | | | | | | | | | | | | 0 |
| — | (South Africa) LDS-Repco | Ret | | | | | | | | | | | | 0 |
| — | (United Kingdom) Cooper-Climax | Ret | | | | | | | | | | | | 0 |
| — | (United States) Eagle-Climax | | | | | | | | | | DNS | | | 0 |
| Pos. | Manufacturer | RSA (South Africa) | ESP (Spain) | MON (Monaco) | BEL (Belgium) | NED (Netherlands) | FRA (France) | GBR (United Kingdom) | GER (West Germany) | ITA (Italy) | CAN (Canada) | USA (United States) | MEX (Mexico) | Pts. |

- Bold results counted to championship totals.

== Non-championship races ==
Other Formula One races held in 1968, which did not count towards the World Championship.

| Race name | Circuit | Date | Winning driver | Constructor | Report |
|---|---|---|---|---|---|
| (United Kingdom) III Race of Champions | Brands Hatch | 17 March | (New Zealand) Bruce McLaren | (United Kingdom) McLaren-Cosworth | Report |
| (United Kingdom) XX BRDC International Trophy | Silverstone | 27 April | (New Zealand) Denny Hulme | (United Kingdom) McLaren-Cosworth | Report |
| (United Kingdom) XV International Gold Cup | Oulton Park | 17 August | (United Kingdom) Jackie Stewart | (France) Matra-Cosworth | Report |
