= LDS (automobile) =

South African motorsport team

LDS as a Formula One chassis constructor
- Base: South Africa
- Founder(s): Doug Serrurier

Formula One World Championship career
- Engines: Alfa Romeo L4, Climax L4, Repco V8
- Entrants: Otelle Nucci; Sam Tingle; Team Gunston; Jackie Pretorius
- First entry: 1962 South African Grand Prix
- Last entry: 1968 South African Grand Prix
- Races entered: 5
- Race victories: 0
- Constructors' Championships: 0
- Drivers' Championships: 0
- Pole positions: 0
- Fastest laps: 0

LDS is the name given to various single seater racing specials built for the South African Formula One Championship. The "specials" were built by Louis Douglas Serrurier, hence the name. The Mark 1 and Mark 2 models were based on Cooper designs, whilst the Mark 3 was based on the Brabham BT11. Mark 1 and Mark 2 models (1962–1965) used Alfa Romeo 1.5-litre straight-4 engines.

A total of eight LDS cars participated in five World Championship Grands Prix. They did not score any World Championship points.

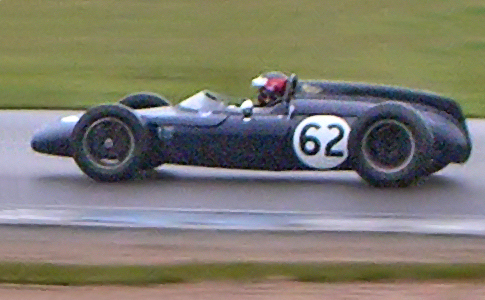
Ian Ashley racing an LDS-Alfa Romeo Mk 1

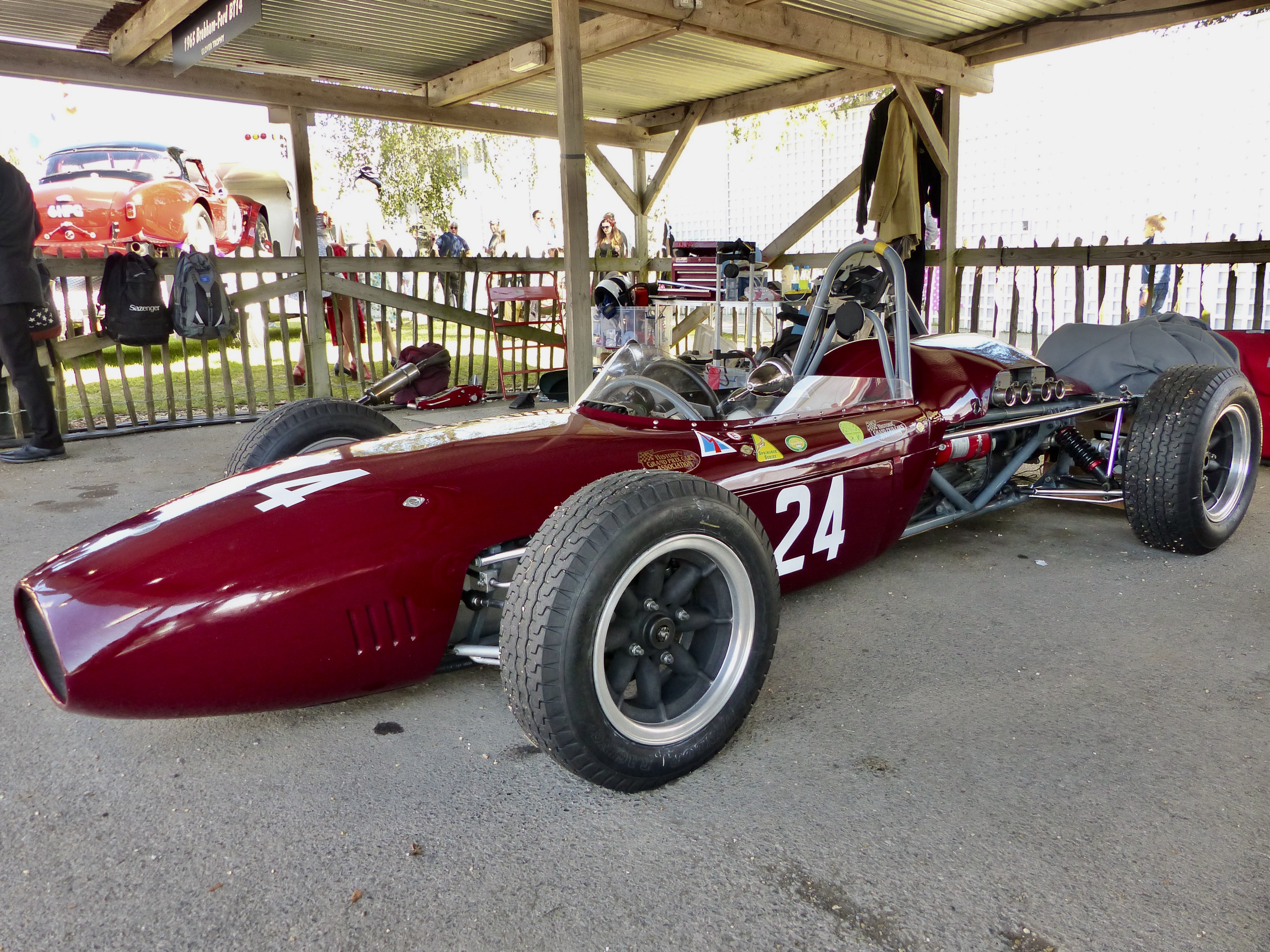
LDS-Climax Mk 3, Goodwood Revival Meeting, 2016

== Complete Formula One World Championship results ==
(key) (results in bold indicate pole position) (results in italics indicate fastest lap)

Year	Entrant	Chassis	Engine	Tyres	Driver	1	2	3	4	5	6	7	8	9	10	11	12	Points	WCC
1962	Otelle Nucci	LDS Mk1	Alfa Romeo Giulietta 1.5 L4	D		NED	MON	BEL	FRA	GBR	GER	ITA	USA	RSA				0	NC
1962	Otelle Nucci	LDS Mk1	Alfa Romeo Giulietta 1.5 L4	D	(South Africa) Doug Serrurier									Ret				0	NC
1963	Otelle Nucci	LDS Mk1	Alfa Romeo Giulietta 1.5 L4	D		MON	BEL	NED	FRA	GBR	GER	ITA	USA	MEX	RSA			0	NC
1963	Otelle Nucci	LDS Mk1	Alfa Romeo Giulietta 1.5 L4	D	(South Africa) Doug Serrurier										11			0	NC
1963	Sam Tingle	LDS Mk1	Alfa Romeo Giulietta 1.5 L4	D	(Federation of Rhodesia and Nyasaland) Sam Tingle										Ret			0	NC
1965	Otelle Nucci	LDS Mk2	Coventry Climax FPF 1.5 L4	D		RSA	MON	BEL	FRA	GBR	NED	GER	ITA	USA	MEX			0	NC
1965	Otelle Nucci	LDS Mk2	Coventry Climax FPF 1.5 L4	D	(South Africa) Doug Serrurier	DNQ												0	NC
1965	Sam Tingle	LDS Mk1	Alfa Romeo Giulietta 1.5 L4	D	(Rhodesia) Sam Tingle	13												0	NC
1965	Jackie Pretorius	LDS Mk1	Alfa Romeo Giulietta 1.5 L4	D	(South Africa) Jackie Pretorius	DNPQ												0	NC
1967	Sam Tingle	LDS Mk3B	Coventry Climax FPF 2.8 L4	D		RSA	MON	NED	BEL	FRA	GBR	GER	CAN	ITA	USA	MEX		0	NC
1967	Sam Tingle	LDS Mk3B	Coventry Climax FPF 2.8 L4	D	(Rhodesia) Sam Tingle	Ret												0	NC
1968	Team Gunston	LDS Mk3B	Repco-Brabham RB620 3.0 V8	F		RSA	ESP	MON	BEL	NED	FRA	GBR	GER	ITA	CAN	USA	MEX	0	NC
1968	Team Gunston	LDS Mk3B	Repco-Brabham RB620 3.0 V8	F	(Rhodesia) Sam Tingle	Ret												0	NC
