= 1968 South African Grand Prix =

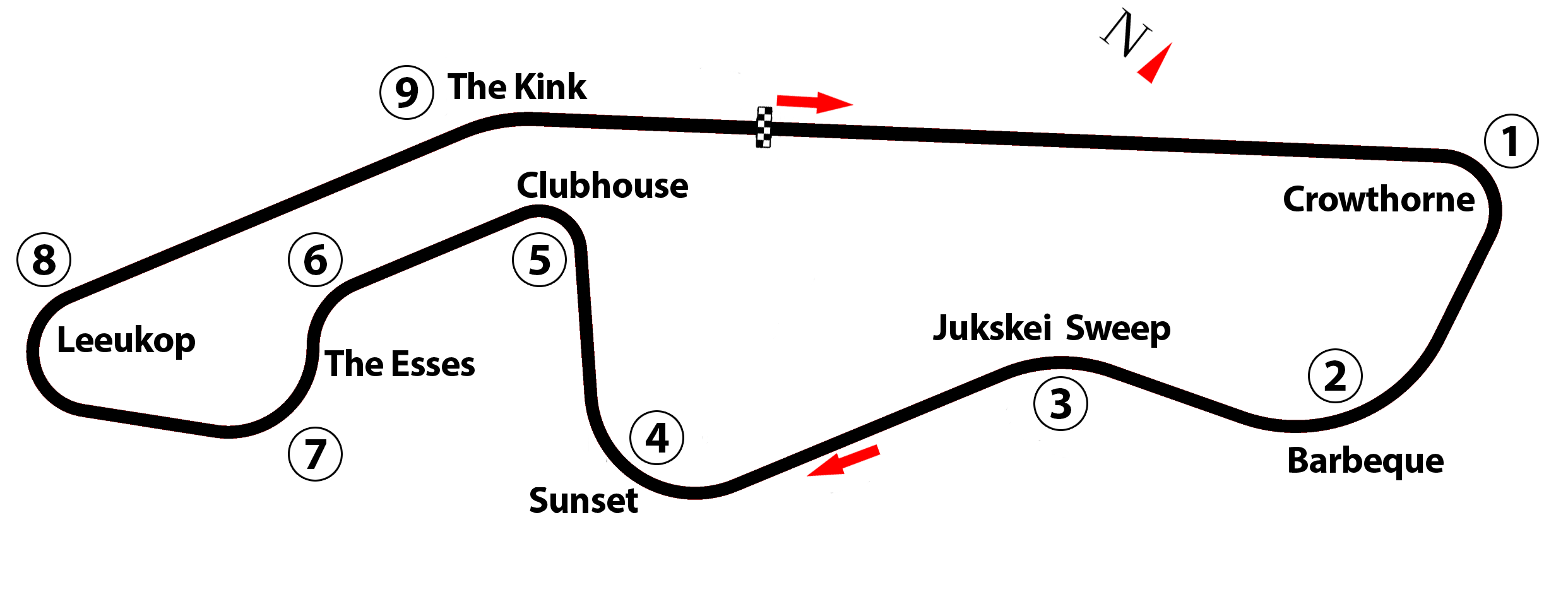

Race details
- Date: 1 January 1968
- Official name: 2nd AA Grand Prix of South Africa
- Location: Kyalami, Midrand, Transvaal Province, South Africa
- Course: Permanent racing facility
- Course length: 4.104 km (2.550 miles)
- Distance: 80 laps, 328.320 km (204.009 miles)
- Weather: Very hot, dry

Pole position
Driver	(United Kingdom) Jim Clark	Lotus-Ford
- Time: 1:21.6

Fastest lap
Driver	(United Kingdom) Jim Clark	Lotus-Ford
- Time: 1:23.7 on lap 73

Podium
First	(United Kingdom) Jim Clark	Lotus-Ford
Second	(United Kingdom) Graham Hill	Lotus-Ford
Third	(Austria) Jochen Rindt	Brabham-Repco

The 1968 South African Grand Prix, formally the 2nd AA Grand Prix of South Africa (Afrikaans: Tweede AA Suid-Afrikaanse Grand Prix), was a Formula One motor race held at Kyalami Circuit on Monday 1 January 1968. It was race 1 of 12 in both the 1968 World Championship of Drivers and the 1968 International Cup for Formula One Manufacturers. The 80-lap race was won by two time World Drivers' Champion and 1965 Indianapolis 500 winner Jim Clark for Lotus-Ford after starting from pole position. The race is significant as not only the last Formula One race to be won by Clark, but also the last in which he ever competed, due to his fatal crash at the Hockenheimring in Germany three months later. At this race Team Gunston became the first Formula One team to paint their cars in the livery of their sponsors instead of national colours when they entered a private Brabham for John Love and an LDS for Sam Tingle.

This was also Mike Spence's final race, as he too was killed a few months later, while practising for the 1968 Indianapolis 500.

The first six slots on the grid were filled by either previous or future world champions. However the reigning champion, Denny Hulme, only started in ninth.

Clark broke many records during the weekend, such as leading the most Grands Prix (43), having the most laps led (1,943), having the most perfect weekends (11), achieving the most pole positions (33) and finally achieving 25 race wins, beating Juan Manuel Fangio's 11-year-old record.

== Classification ==
=== Qualifying ===
The qualifying session was held on 31 December 1967.

Pos	No	Driver	Constructor	Time	Gap
1	4	(United Kingdom) Jim Clark	Lotus-Ford	1:21.6	—
2	5	(United Kingdom) Graham Hill	Lotus-Ford	1:22.6	+1.0
3	16	(United Kingdom) Jackie Stewart	Matra-Ford	1:22.7	+1.1
4	3	(Austria) Jochen Rindt	Brabham-Repco	1:23.0	+1.4
5	2	(Australia) Jack Brabham	Brabham-Repco	1:23.2	+1.6
6	7	(United Kingdom) John Surtees	Honda	1:23.5	+1.9
7	10	(Italy) Andrea de Adamich	Ferrari	1:23.6	+2.0
8	8	(New Zealand) Chris Amon	Ferrari	1:23.8	+2.2
9	1	(New Zealand) Denny Hulme	McLaren-BRM	1:24.0	+2.4
10	11	(Mexico) Pedro Rodríguez	BRM	1:24.9	+3.3
11	9	(Belgium) Jacky Ickx	Ferrari	1:24.9	+3.3
12	6	(United States) Dan Gurney	Eagle-Weslake	1:25.6	+4.0
13	12	(United Kingdom) Mike Spence	BRM	1:25.9	+4.3
14	22	(South Africa) Dave Charlton	Brabham-Repco	1:26.2	+4.6
15	15	(Italy) Ludovico Scarfiotti	Cooper-Maserati	1:26.3	+4.7
16	19	(Switzerland) Jo Siffert	Cooper-Maserati	1:26.4	+4.8
17	17	(Rhodesia) John Love	Brabham-Repco	1:27.0	+5.4
18	21	(France) Jean-Pierre Beltoise	Matra-Ford	1:27.2	+5.6
19	20	(Sweden) Jo Bonnier	Cooper-Maserati	1:27.3	+5.7
20	25	(South Africa) Basil van Rooyen	Cooper-Climax	1:27.8	+6.2
21	14	(United Kingdom) Brian Redman	Cooper-Maserati	1:28.0	+6.4
22	18	(Rhodesia) Sam Tingle	LDS-Repco	1:28.6	+7.0
23	23	(South Africa) Jackie Pretorius	Brabham-Climax	1:29.0	+7.4

=== Race ===
Pos	No	Driver	Constructor	Laps	Time/Retired	Grid	Points
1	4	(United Kingdom) Jim Clark	Lotus-Ford	80	1:53:56.6	1	9
2	5	(United Kingdom) Graham Hill	Lotus-Ford	80	+ 25.3	2	6
3	3	(Austria) Jochen Rindt	Brabham-Repco	80	+ 30.4	4	4
4	8	(New Zealand) Chris Amon	Ferrari	78	+ 2 Laps	8	3
5	1	(New Zealand) Denny Hulme	McLaren-BRM	78	+ 2 Laps	9	2
6	21	(France) Jean-Pierre Beltoise	Matra-Ford	77	+ 3 Laps	18	1
7	19	(Switzerland) Jo Siffert	Cooper-Maserati	77	+ 3 Laps	16	
8	7	(United Kingdom) John Surtees	Honda	75	+ 5 Laps	6	
9	17	(Rhodesia) John Love	Brabham-Repco	75	+ 5 Laps	17	
NC	23	(South Africa) Jackie Pretorius	Brabham-Climax	71	+ 9 Laps	23	
Ret	6	(United States) Dan Gurney	Eagle-Weslake	58	Oil Leak	12	
Ret	9	(Belgium) Jacky Ickx	Ferrari	51	Oil Leak	11	
Ret	20	(Sweden) Jo Bonnier	Cooper-Maserati	46	Overheating	19	
Ret	16	(United Kingdom) Jackie Stewart	Matra-Ford	43	Engine	3	
Ret	18	(Rhodesia) Sam Tingle	LDS-Repco	35	Overheating	22	
Ret	25	(South Africa) Basil van Rooyen	Cooper-Climax	22	Engine	20	
Ret	11	(Mexico) Pedro Rodríguez	BRM	20	Fuel System	10	
Ret	2	(Australia) Jack Brabham	Brabham-Repco	16	Engine	5	
Ret	10	(Italy) Andrea de Adamich	Ferrari	13	Accident	7	
Ret	12	(United Kingdom) Mike Spence	BRM	7	Fuel System	14	
Ret	14	(United Kingdom) Brian Redman	Cooper-Maserati	4	Oil Leak	21	
Ret	22	(South Africa) Dave Charlton	Brabham-Repco	3	Differential	14	
Ret	15	(Italy) Ludovico Scarfiotti	Cooper-Maserati	2	Water Pipe	15	

== Notes ==
- This was the Formula One World Championship debut for South African driver Basil van Rooyen and Italian driver Andrea de Adamich.

== Championship standings after the race ==
Drivers' Championship standings

Pos	Driver	Points
1	(United Kingdom) Jim Clark	9
2	(United Kingdom) Graham Hill	6
3	(Austria) Jochen Rindt	4
4	(New Zealand) Chris Amon	3
5	(New Zealand) Denny Hulme	2

Constructors' Championship standings

Pos	Constructor	Points
1	(United Kingdom) Lotus-Ford	9
2	(United Kingdom) Brabham-Repco	4
3	(Italy) Ferrari	3
4	(United Kingdom) McLaren-BRM	2
5	(France) Matra-Ford	1

- Note: Only the top five positions are included for both sets of standings.

Previous race: 1967 Mexican Grand Prix	FIA Formula One World Championship; 1968 season	Next race: 1968 Spanish Grand Prix
Previous race: 1967 South African Grand Prix	South African Grand Prix	Next race: 1969 South African Grand Prix
