= 1962 South African Grand Prix =

- Race 9 of 9 in the 1962 Formula One season

Race details
- Date: 29 December 1962
- Official name: 9th International RAC Grand Prix of South Africa
- Location: Prince George Circuit; East London, South Africa
- Course: Temporary road circuit
- Course length: 3.920 km (2.436 miles)
- Distance: 82 laps, 321.415 km (199.718 miles)
- Weather: Dry, windy

Pole position
Driver	(United Kingdom) Jim Clark	Lotus-Climax
- Time: 1:29.3

Fastest lap
Driver	(United Kingdom) Jim Clark	Lotus-Climax
- Time: 1:31.0 on lap 3

Podium
First	(United Kingdom) Graham Hill	BRM
Second	(New Zealand) Bruce McLaren	Cooper-Climax
Third	(South Africa) Tony Maggs	Cooper-Climax

The 1962 South African Grand Prix, formally titled the 9th International RAC Grand Prix of South Africa, was a Formula One motor race held at East London on 29 December 1962. It was the ninth and final race in both the 1962 World Championship of Drivers and the 1962 International Cup for Formula One Manufacturers. The 82-lap race was won by Graham Hill driving a BRM, the Englishman taking his first Drivers' Championship in the process, with New Zealander Bruce McLaren and local driver Tony Maggs second and third, respectively, in works Cooper-Climaxes.

Hill went into the race with a nine-point lead in the Drivers' Championship over Scotland's Jim Clark, driving a works Lotus-Climax. A Clark win would give him the championship regardless of Hill's performance because only the top 5 results counted for the championship. After taking pole position, Clark led comfortably until an oil leak 20 laps from the finish forced him to retire, handing the championship to Hill. The win also gave BRM their first and only Manufacturers' Cup.

== Classification ==
=== Qualifying ===
Pos	No	Driver	Constructor	Qualifying times			Gap
Pos	No	Driver	Constructor	Q1	Q2	Q3	Gap
1	1	(United Kingdom) Jim Clark	Lotus-Climax	1:38.5	1:29.8	1:29.3†	—
2	3	(United Kingdom) Graham Hill	BRM	1:33.1	1:30.0	1:29.6	+0.3
3	10	(Australia) Jack Brabham	Brabham-Climax	No time	1:32.3	1:31.0	+1.7
4	11	(United Kingdom) Innes Ireland	Lotus-Climax	No time	1:33.6	1:31.1	+1.8
5	6	(United Kingdom) John Surtees	Lola-Climax	1:35.5	1:36.1	1:31.5	+2.2
6	9	(South Africa) Tony Maggs	Cooper-Climax	1:39.7	1:31.7	1:32.7	+2.4
7	4	(United States) Richie Ginther	BRM	1:34.0	1:32.8	1:31.7	+2.4
8	8	(New Zealand) Bruce McLaren	Cooper-Climax	No time	1:33.0	1:31.7	+2.4
9	2	(United Kingdom) Trevor Taylor	Lotus-Climax	No time	1:32.7	(1:30.9)†	+3.4
10	20	(South Africa) Neville Lederle	Lotus-Climax	No time	1:36.0	1:33.6	+4.3
11	7	(United Kingdom) Roy Salvadori	Lola-Climax	1:37.0	1:35.4	No time	+6.1
12	18	(Federation of Rhodesia and Nyasaland) John Love	Cooper-Climax	No time	1:36.4	1:37.6	+7.1
13	14	(South Africa) Ernie Pieterse	Lotus-Climax	No time	1:37.3	1:36.8	+7.5
14	21	(South Africa) Doug Serrurier	LDS-Alfa Romeo	1:38.7	1:37.2	1:36.8	+7.5
15	22	(South Africa) Mike Harris	Cooper-Alfa Romeo	1:40.2	No time	1:39.1	+9.8
16	15	(Netherlands) Carel Godin de Beaufort	Porsche	No time	1:39.3	1:39.2	+9.9
17	5	(South Africa) Bruce Johnstone^{1}	BRM	—	—	—	—

- ^1 – Bruce Johnstone was unable to set a time in qualifying due to engine problems, and consequently had to start from the back of the grid.
- † — Jim Clark (1:28.9) and Trevor Taylor posted faster times in their back-up machines, fitted with fuel-injection engines, but these cars were discarded for the race due to reliability issues.

=== Race ===
Pos	No	Driver	Constructor	Laps	Time/Retired	Grid	Points
1	3	(United Kingdom) Graham Hill	BRM	82	2:08:03.3	2	9
2	8	(New Zealand) Bruce McLaren	Cooper-Climax	82	+ 49.8	8	6
3	9	(South Africa) Tony Maggs	Cooper-Climax	82	+ 50.3	6	4
4	10	(Australia) Jack Brabham	Brabham-Climax	82	+ 53.8	3	3
5	11	(United Kingdom) Innes Ireland	Lotus-Climax	81	+ 1 Lap	4	2
6	20	(South Africa) Neville Lederle	Lotus-Climax	78	+ 4 Laps	10	1
7	4	(United States) Richie Ginther	BRM	78	+ 4 Laps	7	
8	18	(Federation of Rhodesia and Nyasaland) John Love	Cooper-Climax	78	+ 4 Laps	12	
9	5	(South Africa) Bruce Johnstone	BRM	76	+ 6 Laps	17	
10	14	(South Africa) Ernie Pieterse	Lotus-Climax	71	+ 11 Laps	13	
11	15	(Netherlands) Carel Godin de Beaufort	Porsche	70	Fuel System	16	
Ret	1	(United Kingdom) Jim Clark	Lotus-Climax	62	Oil Leak	1	
Ret	21	(South Africa) Doug Serrurier	LDS-Alfa Romeo	62	Radiator	14	
Ret	7	(United Kingdom) Roy Salvadori	Lola-Climax	56	Fuel Leak	11	
Ret	22	(South Africa) Mike Harris	Cooper-Alfa Romeo	31	Wheel Bearing	15	
Ret	6	(United Kingdom) John Surtees	Lola-Climax	26	Engine	5	
Ret	2	(United Kingdom) Trevor Taylor	Lotus-Climax	11	Gearbox	9	
WD	12	(Federation of Rhodesia and Nyasaland) Gary Hocking	Lotus-Climax		Driver killed prior to event		
WD	16	(South Africa) Syd van der Vyver	Lotus-Climax		Car damaged		
WD	17	(United States) Tony Settember	Emeryson-Climax				
WD	19	(Federation of Rhodesia and Nyasaland) Sam Tingle	Lotus-Climax		Driver competing elsewhere		

== Notes ==
- This was the Formula One World Championship debut for South African drivers Neville Lederle, Ernie Pieterse, Doug Serrurier, Bruce Johnstone and Syd van der Vyver; and for Rhodesian drivers John Love, Mike Harris, Gary Hocking and Sam Tingle. It was also the first race for a Rhodesian driver.
- LDS also made its debut in the Formula One World Championship in this race, being the first South African constructor.
- This race was the 100th Formula One World Championship Grand Prix, excluding the eleven Indianapolis 500 races that were held between 1950-1960. In those 100 races:
  - Maurice Trintignant was the most experienced, having raced 75 of them, but also having the most retirements at 35.
  - Juan Manuel Fangio had achieved 29 pole positions, 23 fastest laps, 24 Grands Prix wins, 35 podium places, and 5 World Championships.
  - Ferrari was the most constant constructor and engine supplier, having raced 94 of them (93 as a constructor), BRM had had a record 12 retirements as a constructor. A Maserati-powered car had retired the race a record 13 times.
  - Ferrari also achieved 38 pole positions, 34 fastest laps, 35 Grands Prix wins, 128 podium places and 5 Drivers' World Titles in this timespan.
  - British engine supplier Coventry Climax had achieved 2 Constructors' World Titles.

== Final Championship standings ==
Drivers' Championship standings

Pos	Driver	Points
1	(United Kingdom) Graham Hill	42 (52)
2	(United Kingdom) Jim Clark	30
3	(New Zealand) Bruce McLaren	27 (32)
4	(United Kingdom) John Surtees	19
5	(United States) Dan Gurney	15

Constructors' Championship standings

Pos	Constructor	Points
1	(United Kingdom) BRM	42 (56)
2	(United Kingdom) Lotus-Climax	36 (38)
3	(United Kingdom) Cooper-Climax	29 (37)
4	(United Kingdom) Lola-Climax	19
5	(Germany) Porsche	18 (19)

- Notes: Only the top five positions are included for both sets of standings. Only the best 5 results counted towards the Championship. Numbers without parentheses are Championship points; numbers in parentheses are total points scored.

Previous race: 1962 United States Grand Prix	FIA Formula One World Championship; 1962 season	Next race: 1963 Monaco Grand Prix
Previous race: 1961 South African Grand Prix	South African Grand Prix	Next race: 1963 South African Grand Prix
