= 1968 Belgian Grand Prix =

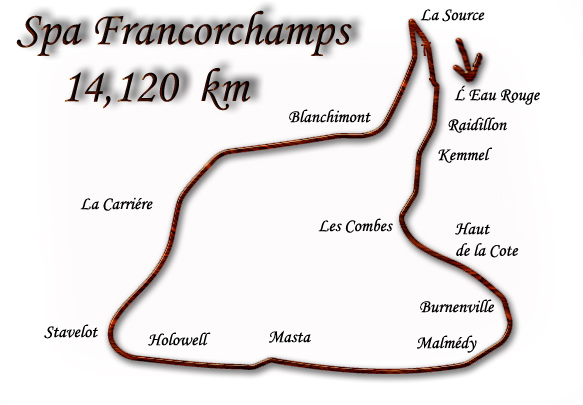

Race details
- Date: 9 June 1968
- Official name: XXVIII Grand Prix de Belgique
- Location: Circuit de Spa-Francorchamps, Francorchamps, Spa, Belgium
- Course: Permanent racing facility
- Course length: 14.100 km (8.761 miles)
- Distance: 28 laps, 394.800 km (245.317 miles)
- Weather: Overcast, Dry

Pole position
Driver	(New Zealand) Chris Amon	Ferrari
- Time: 3:28.6

Fastest lap
Driver	(United Kingdom) John Surtees	Honda
- Time: 3:30.5 on lap 5

Podium
First	(New Zealand) Bruce McLaren	McLaren-Ford
Second	(Mexico) Pedro Rodríguez	BRM
Third	(Belgium) Jacky Ickx	Ferrari

The 1968 Belgian Grand Prix was a Formula One motor race held at the Spa-Francorchamps Circuit on 9 June 1968. It was race 4 of 12 in both the 1968 World Championship of Drivers and the 1968 International Cup for Formula One Manufacturers. The 28-lap race was won by McLaren driver Bruce McLaren after he started from sixth position. Pedro Rodríguez finished second for the BRM team and Ferrari driver Jacky Ickx came in third.

On the seventh lap Brian Redman went off the circuit when his suspension failed and he crashed into and over a concrete barrier and into a parked car. His Cooper caught fire but Redman escaped with a severely broken right arm and a few minor burns.

== Background ==
After the introduction of 'dive plane' wings on the nosecone on a Formula One car by Lotus at the previous race, the 1968 Monaco Grand Prix, Ferrari added a strut mounted negative incidence wing – to their lead driver Chris Amon's car and he nabbed pole position, and was 4 seconds faster in qualifying than the next fastest car of Jackie Stewart, though Amon claimed to have performed similar lap times without the wings. Amon's teammate Jacky Ickx did not have wings on his car. The Brabham team also fitted a rear wing to Jack Brabham's car, paired with dive planes on the nose to counteract lift. Wings were added to Ickx's car (and many other teams copied the idea for their cars) for the next race, the 1968 Dutch Grand Prix at Zandvoort. As 1968 season progressed, many F1 teams utilized strut mounted wings attached directly to suspension elements – copying Chaparral sports car practice – to increase cornering speeds, reducing lap times. Ferrari never utilized strut mounted wings attached to suspension, as Enzo Ferrari considered it far too dangerous, continuing with strut mounted wings mounted directly to the chassis.

== Classification ==
=== Qualifying ===
Pos	No	Driver	Constructor	Time	Gap
1	22	(New Zealand) Chris Amon	Ferrari	3:28.6	—
2	7	(United Kingdom) Jackie Stewart	Matra-Ford	3:32.3	+3.7
3	23	(Belgium) Jacky Ickx	Ferrari	3:34.3	+5.7
4	20	(United Kingdom) John Surtees	Honda	3:35.0	+6.4
5	6	(New Zealand) Denny Hulme	McLaren-Ford	3:35.4	+6.8
6	5	(New Zealand) Bruce McLaren	McLaren-Ford	3:37.1	+8.5
7	14	(United Kingdom) Piers Courage	BRM	3:37.2	+8.6
8	11	(Mexico) Pedro Rodríguez	BRM	3:37.8	+9.2
9	3	(Switzerland) Jo Siffert	Lotus-Ford	3:39.0	+10.4
10	16	(United Kingdom) Brian Redman	Cooper-BRM	3:41.4	+12.8
11	12	(United Kingdom) Richard Attwood	BRM	3:45.2	+16.6
12	15	(Belgium) Lucien Bianchi	Cooper-BRM	3:45.9	+17.3
13	10	(France) Jean-Pierre Beltoise	Matra	3:52.9	+24.3
14	1	(United Kingdom) Graham Hill	Lotus-Ford	4:06.1	+37.5
15	2	(United Kingdom) Jackie Oliver	Lotus-Ford	4:30.8	+1:02.2
16	17	(Sweden) Jo Bonnier	McLaren-BRM	4:34.3	+1:05.7
17	19	(Austria) Jochen Rindt	Brabham-Repco	4:46.7	+1:18.1
18	18	(Australia) Jack Brabham	Brabham-Repco		

=== Race ===
Pos	No	Driver	Constructor	Laps	Time/Retired	Grid	Points
1	5	(New Zealand) Bruce McLaren	McLaren-Ford	28	1:40:02.1	6	9
2	11	(Mexico) Pedro Rodríguez	BRM	28	+ 12.1	8	6
3	23	(Belgium) Jacky Ickx	Ferrari	28	+ 39.6	3	4
4	7	(United Kingdom) Jackie Stewart	Matra-Ford	27	Out of fuel	2	3
5	2	(United Kingdom) Jackie Oliver	Lotus-Ford	26	Transmission	15	2
6	15	(Belgium) Lucien Bianchi	Cooper-BRM	26	+ 2 Laps	12	1
7	3	(Switzerland) Jo Siffert	Lotus-Ford	25	Oil pressure	9	
8	10	(France) Jean-Pierre Beltoise	Matra	25	+ 3 Laps	13	
Ret	14	(United Kingdom) Piers Courage	BRM	22	Engine	7	
Ret	6	(New Zealand) Denny Hulme	McLaren-Ford	18	Halfshaft	5	
Ret	20	(United Kingdom) John Surtees	Honda	11	Suspension	4	
Ret	22	(New Zealand) Chris Amon	Ferrari	8	Radiator	1	
Ret	16	(United Kingdom) Brian Redman	Cooper-BRM	6	Spun Off	10	
Ret	12	(United Kingdom) Richard Attwood	BRM	6	Oil Pipe	11	
Ret	18	(Australia) Jack Brabham	Brabham-Repco	6	Throttle	18	
Ret	1	(United Kingdom) Graham Hill	Lotus-Ford	5	Halfshaft	14	
Ret	19	(Austria) Jochen Rindt	Brabham-Repco	5	Engine	17	
Ret	17	(Sweden) Jo Bonnier	McLaren-BRM	1	Wheel	16	

== Notes ==
- This was the first of many Grand Prix wins for McLaren. Also, Bruce McLaren was the third driver to win in a car of his own making, after Jack Brabham and Dan Gurney.

== Championship standings after the race ==
Drivers' Championship standings

	Pos	Driver	Points
	1	(United Kingdom) Graham Hill	24
	2	(New Zealand) Denny Hulme	10
14	3	(New Zealand) Bruce McLaren	9
1	4	(United Kingdom) Jim Clark	9
10	5	(Mexico) Pedro Rodríguez	6

Constructors' Championship standings

	Pos	Constructor	Points
	1	(United Kingdom) Lotus-Ford	29
	2	(United Kingdom) McLaren-Ford	17
1	3	(United Kingdom) BRM	12
1	4	(United Kingdom) Cooper-BRM	9
1	5	(Italy) Ferrari	7

- Note: Only the top five positions are included for both sets of standings.

Previous race: 1968 Monaco Grand Prix	FIA Formula One World Championship; 1968 season	Next race: 1968 Dutch Grand Prix
Previous race: 1967 Belgian Grand Prix	Belgian Grand Prix	Next race: 1970 Belgian Grand Prix
