= History of Formula One =

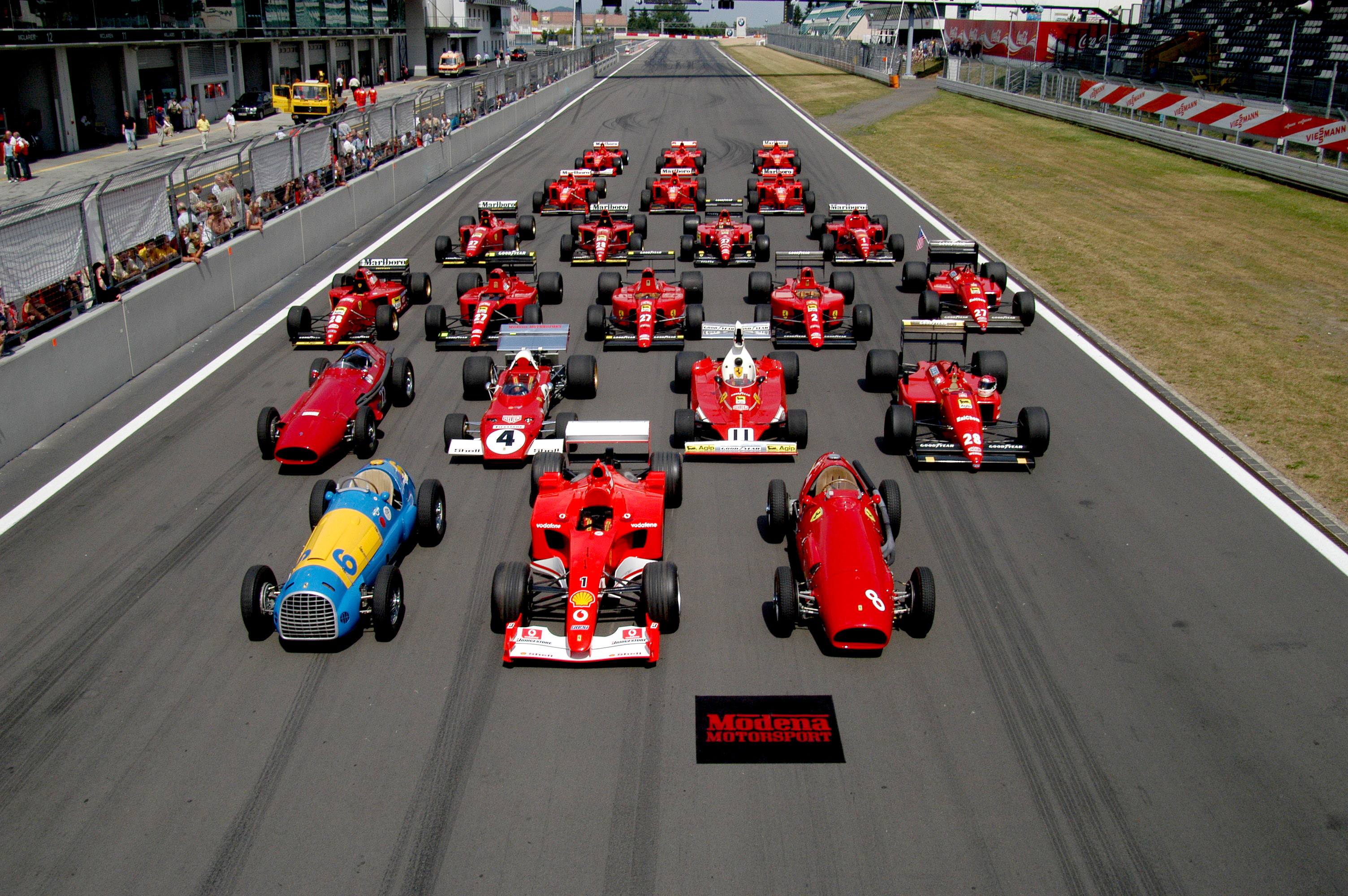
Some Scuderia Ferrari Formula One cars from between 1950 and 2002

Formula One automobile racing has its roots in the European Grand Prix championships of the 1920s and 1930s. The modern era officially began in 1946 when the Fédération Internationale de l'Automobile (FIA) standardised a set of engine and chassis rules, which led to the inaugural FIA World Championship of Drivers in 1950 at the Silverstone Circuit.

The history of Formula One is marked by the evolution of its technical regulations, and distinct periods of team and driver dominance. Significant mechanical developments include the mid-engine layout shift in the late 1950s, ground-effect aerodynamics and turbocharging in the 1970s and 1980s, active suspension in the 1990s, and 1.6-liter V6 turbo-hybrid power units introduced in 2014. These technical shifts coincided with dominant eras for constructors including Alfa Romeo, Ferrari, Cooper, Lotus, Williams, McLaren, Mercedes and Red Bull.

Driver safety regulation transformed significantly following driver casualties in the 1960s, 1970s and 1994, leading to mandatory circuit updates, structural crash standards, and cockpit protection systems such as the halo. Commercially, the championship shifted from a largely European-based series with independent non-championship races and regional series (such as in South Africa and the United Kingdom in the 1960s and 1970s) to a centralised global broadcast property controlled through commercial rights agreements starting in the late 1970s.

== History ==
=== Early years and continuation of pre-World War II supercharged engines (1946–1950) ===
Formula One was first defined in 1946 by the Commission Sportive Internationale (CSI) of the FIA, forerunner of FISA, as the premier single-seater racing category in worldwide motorsport to become effective in 1947. This new "International Formula" was initially known variously as Formula A, Formula I, or Formula 1 with the corresponding "Voiturette" formula being titled Formula B, Formula II, or Formula 2. When the 500cc formula was internationally recognised as Formula 3 in 1950 it was never titled as "Formula C" so the three International Formulae were then "officially" titled Formula 1, Formula 2 and Formula 3.

In the beginning, the formula was largely based on pre-World War II regulations defined by engine capacity. The regulation expected to bring a new balance between supercharged and normally aspirated cars. Non-supercharged 4.5-litre pre-war Grand Prix cars were allowed to race against the pre-war 1.5-litre supercharged 'voiturettes', while pre-war supercharged 3-litre Grand Prix cars were banned.

There is some debate as to what can be considered to be the first Formula 1 race. The first race under the new regulations was the 1946 Turin Grand Prix held on 1 September, won by Achille Varzi in an Alfa Romeo 158 Alfetta, but this was before the Formula was officially in place. The next contender is the 1947 Swedish Winter Grand Prix which was won by Reg Parnell driving an ERA; but this race was run on ice and some consider that it therefore was not a "proper" race (there is also some doubt whether it was a Formula 1 race or a Formule Libre race). The third claimant is the 1947 Pau Grand Prix which was won by Nello Pagani driving a Maserati 4CL, which is irrefutable.

Championships for drivers or constructors were not introduced immediately. In the early years there were around 20 races held from late spring to early autumn in Europe, although not all of these were considered significant. Most competitive cars came from Italy, particularly Maserati. Some pre-war racing heroes like Rudolf Caracciola, Manfred Von Brauchitsch and Tazio Nuvolari floundered and ended their careers, while drivers like Alberto Ascari and Juan Manuel Fangio rose to the front.

=== Era of factory Italian and Mercedes front-engine cars (1950–1957) ===
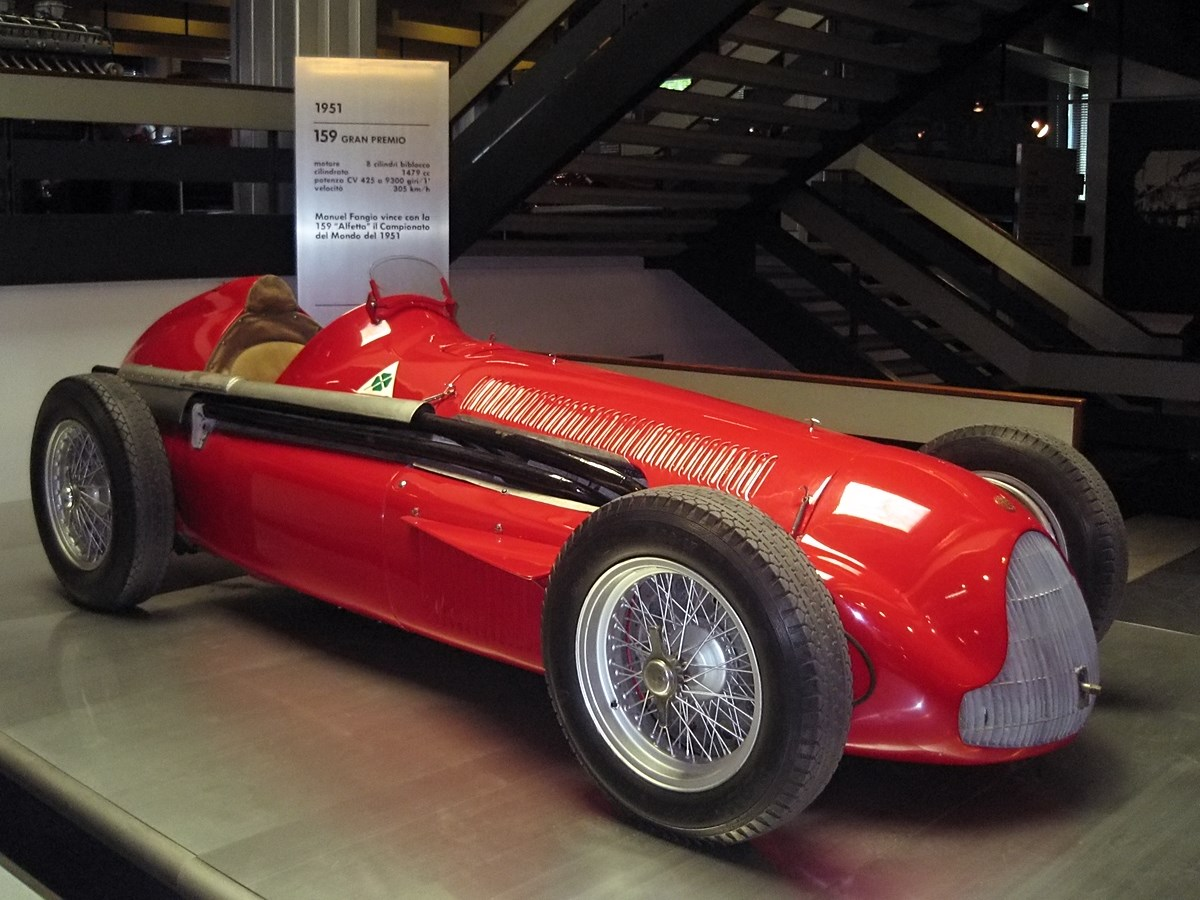
Juan Manuel Fangio drove this Alfa Romeo 159 to the title in 1951

The Motorcycle World Championships were introduced in 1949. In 1950, the FIA responded with the first ever official World Championship for Drivers. The championship series, to be held across six of the 'major' Grands Prix of Europe plus the Indianapolis 500, was a formalization of what had already been developing in Grand Prix racing during the previous years. Italian teams of Alfa Romeo, Ferrari, and Maserati were best positioned to dominate the early years. Other national manufacturers – such as the French manufacturer Talbot or the British BRM – competed, although less successfully. A number of private cars also took part in local races. The Italian and German factory teams in those days often employed 2 to 3 drivers whose nationality was the same as the team's and at least 1 foreign driver; for example the Alfa Romeo team in 1950 consisted of Italian drivers Giuseppe Farina, Luigi Fagioli and Piero Taruffi; and Argentine driver Juan Manuel Fangio.

Alfa Romeo dominated in the 1950 season, winning every race but one in the championship with the pre-war "Alfetta" 158s. The sole exception was the Indianapolis 500, which was part of the championship (1950 to 1960), although not run to Formula One regulations and never contested by the teams that participated on the regular Formula One circuit (Alberto Ascari in 1952 and Juan Manuel Fangio in 1958 being the only regular Formula One drivers to compete in the Indianapolis 500 during this period). Nino Farina won the inaugural championship, followed by Juan Manuel Fangio in 1951 with the Alfa-Romeo 159, an evolution of the 158. The Alfetta's engines were extremely powerful for their capacity: in 1951 the 159 engine was producing around 420 bhp (310 kW), albeit with a high fuel consumption of 125 to 175 litres per 100 km (2.26 to 1.61 mpg imp/1.88 mpg to 1.34 mpg US).

Enzo Ferrari, who had raced the Alfettas before the war, and his engine designer Aurelio Lampredi, were the first to understand that the 1.5-litre supercharged engine was a dead end: any increase in power meant more fuel to carry or more time lost in the pits for refuelling, so for the last races of 1950 Ferrari retired the 1.5-litre supercharged Ferrari 125, and fielded the new V12 4.5-litre normally aspirated Ferrari 375. With a fuel consumption of around 35 litres per 100 kilometres (8.1 mpg_{‑imp}; 6.7 mpg_{‑US}) the 375 offered fierce opposition to the Alfettas towards the end of the 1951 season. Alfa Romeo, at the time a state-owned company, decided to withdraw after a refusal of the Italian government to fund the expensive design of a new car. Up to that point, Alfa Romeo's involvement in racing had been carried out with a very thin budget, using mostly pre-war technology and material during the two seasons. The team had won two championships using only nine pre-war built engine blocks.

With no Alfa Romeo, and an almost undriveable, unreliable BRM, Ferrari stood to sweep the championship. The FIA was in an embarrassing position as it had already announced that current Formula One regulations would last until 1954 before switching to 2.5-litre engines. Major manufacturers were already working to develop cars for the future regulation and saw no point in developing a new car for the only two remaining years of the regulation cycle. The promoters of the World Championship Grands Prix, mindful of the lack of serious competition with the Ferrari 375, decided to adopt Formula Two regulations for two years. However, Ferrari's dominance nevertheless continued with the light 4-cylinder powered Ferrari Tipo 500, bringing Italian Alberto Ascari his two championships in the 1952 and 1953 seasons. Ferrari's Formula One cars continued to race very successfully in non-championship Formula One and Formula Libre races through this period. Ironically, during this period the only World Championship race for which Formula One cars were eligible was the Indianapolis 500. In 1952 Ferrari entered four Formula One 375s with Alberto Ascari as lead driver, but with little success.

Other than the Indianapolis 500, the World Championship was entirely based in Europe until 1953 when the season opened in Argentina. Since then, there has always been at least one race outside Europe each year. As planned, the World Championship races returned to Formula One regulations for the 1954 season, now based on a new 2.5-litre atmospheric engine regulation. This successfully brought more entrants to the field. Lancia and Mercedes-Benz joined the formula, hiring the best drivers of the era: Ascari for Lancia, Fangio for Mercedes. Featuring desmodromic valves, fuel injection, parts made from magnesium and exotic alloys, "streamlined" bodywork and other advanced features, the brand new Mercedes W196 began the 1954 season with Fangio taking pole position at the Grand Prix de l'ACF at Reims-Gueux with the first lap over 200 km/h (124 mph) in Formula One, before winning the race after a duel with other Mercedes driver Karl Kling, who finished second.

The Mercedes cars swept the next two seasons with Fangio and Stirling Moss winning all but three of the races. However, at the end of the 1955 season Mercedes left the formula after the disastrous crash of one of their cars at Le Mans killed 82 people. The company would not return to Formula One for thirty years. After Le Mans, four of the year's remaining Grands Prix were cancelled. The Monaco Grand Prix saw a spectacular incident when Ascari crashed his Lancia into the harbour after missing a chicane. Ascari was pulled out of the water alive and apparently well. However, there was speculation that he had sustained an undetected internal injury when he was killed four days later at Monza while testing a sportscar. After Ascari's death, Lancia followed Mercedes out of the formula, passing their engines, cars, information and technology to Ferrari. The 1956 season saw Fangio make good use of the Lancia-inspired Ferrari D50 to win his fourth championship. In the 1957 season, driving for Maserati, Fangio took his fifth championship, a record which would not be beaten for 46 years.

=== "Garagistes" and the rear-mid engine revolution (1958–1961) ===
See 1958 season, 1959 season, 1960 season and 1961 season.

==== 1958 ====
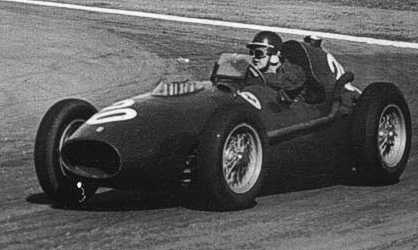
Mike Hawthorn in a Ferrari 246 F1 in the 1958 Argentine Grand Prix

1958 was a watershed year in many ways for Formula One. 47-year-old Juan Manuel Fangio raced only twice, setting pole and fastest lap in his home race, then retiring after a fourth-place finish at the 1958 French Grand Prix. 1958 also marked an influx of English speakers in Formula One, with five British drivers and an American occupying the first six places in 1958, after the sport had historically been dominated by speakers of Romance languages and German. Nearly the same applied for car manufacturers, as barely-known British makers of chassis and engines won all rounds except for two won by Scuderia Ferrari. Some had succeeded in 1500cc Formula Two with new approaches, like making or buying only a chassis, then using a third party engine, mainly the Coventry Climax FPF DOHC 4-cylinder, which Cooper had installed behind the driver in a rear mid-engine, rear-wheel-drive layout that would dominate F1 from 1959 onwards. In single seaters with front engine, the driver either had to sit very high on top of a symmetric drive train, or beside the drive shaft in an asymmetric construction. Such complicated front engine layouts were used until 1960, even though the Auto Union racing cars of the 1930s had demonstrated the benefits of having the driver sitting low in front of a compact drivetrain unit that utilized a limited-slip differential, an old Porsche innovation that had been neglected.

Against a small field of only nine Ferraris and Maseratis, with many European teams still tuning engines for new fuel regulations rather than travelling to the 1958 Argentine Grand Prix in January, Vanwall driver Stirling Moss choose to drive the mid-engined Cooper T43 entered by the private team of Rob Walker. Powered only by an undersized 2-litre Coventry-Climax Straight-4, Moss could not win on outright speed, and compared to the Italians with Centerlock wheel, the four-stud wheel hubs of Cooper would lose additional time in a tyre change. When the race distance was reduced due to hot weather, the team took a gamble by deciding not to make a pit stop at all. With others in the pits, Moss took over the lead. Realizing too late that the little car would not come in, the more powerful Italian cars did not start in time to chase Moss down. Winning with worn out tyres by two seconds, it was the first victory for a car with the engine mounted behind the driver in grand prix racing since the mid-engined Auto Union racing cars had been successful in the 1930s. It was also the first World Championship Grand Prix win for a private entrant (excepting the Indianapolis 500 where all the entries were technically private entrants using bought-in chassis) as well as the first win for a car powered by an engine built by a third party manufacturer, and not even with full capacity. The next Grand Prix in Monaco was also won by the same private team, this time with a newer Cooper T45 driven by Maurice Trintignant and facing more substantial opposition, with 30 entrants competing to qualify for 16 spots on the grid. Still powered by undersized F2-derived engines, the Cooper, Lotus and Porsche 718 remained underdogs in 1958. As soon as the Coventry Climax FPF engine was available with full 2.5-litre size, the little British cars went on to dominate Formula One.

Although the basic 2500cc formula remained unchanged in 1958, engines now had to run on commercial petrol instead of specialised alcohol or methanol-based racing fuels that often contained toxic components. e.g. Benzene (Benzol). While the fuel was now similar to sports car racing, Grand Prix racing started to distinguish itself from very long sports car races with pits stops for changes of drivers and tyres, and consideration for endurance and reliability, by putting emphasis on uninterrupted high speed driving of one pilot, as GP length was shortened from around 500 km/300 miles to 300 km/200 miles. This mostly eliminated the need for scheduled pit stops.

1958 saw the introduction of an International Cup for F1 Manufacturers, with points allocated on an 8, 6, 4, 3, 2, 1 basis to the first six cars in the race (unlike in the Drivers' Championship, there was no point for fastest lap). Furthermore, points were only awarded to the highest placed car of each make; i.e., if a make finished 1st and 2nd they would receive only eight points for 1st. The 2nd placed car would not earn extra points, but the next car would only receive 4 points for 3rd place. The Indianapolis 500, which was included in the World Championship of Drivers until 1960, used different chassis makers in the 1950s, and did not count towards the International Cup for F1 Manufacturers. (In later decades, some chassis makers won both F1 Championships and the Indy 500 in the same year: Lotus with Jim Clark in 1965, and McLaren with Emerson Fittipaldi in 1974.)

The British Vanwall team won six of the nine races it entered, and took the maiden Constructors' Championship that season, but lost the Drivers' Championship on account of their drivers' frequent retirements. The third placed driver Tony Brooks won three GPs, but had to retire five times, earning a 7th place finish in his only other race that season. Stuart Lewis-Evans had an even worse record, with three finishes in the points and five DNFs, the final one being fatal after his engine seized. Stirling Moss won the first race for Cooper, won three more with Vanwall, was beaten only once to second place, but also had to retire from five grands prix, and thus had fewer chances to score the extra point for fastest lap.

Mike Hawthorn in a Ferrari took the 1958 Drivers' Championship – becoming the first English driver to earn a title – by winning just one race, but consistently finishing on the podium, and having only two DNFs. He earned four pole positions, and five fastest laps, often while chasing the leader. Moss, despite having more wins than Hawthorn, had fewer poles, only three fastest laps, and lost the championship by the one point difference. It is often attributed to high sportsmanship that cost Moss the 1958 title, but this is debatable. After the 1958 Portuguese Grand Prix, Hawthorn, who finished second and had set fastest lap, was threatened with disqualification for going in the wrong direction while push-starting his Ferrari downhill, following a spin in which the sputtering engine stalled. Race winner Moss was in the process of lapping Hawthorn, witnessed the whole incident, and argued to stewards on Hawthorn's behalf that no other car was still running, thus none put in jeopardy. The six plus one points were not taken away, and Hawthorn kept his lead in the championship standings, with two more races to go. Because only the six best race results counted towards the championship, Hawthorn had to give up all 7 points from his first three GPs, a 3rd and 5th place plus fastest lap before the DNF at Monaco, leaving 38 points for his win and five second-place finishes in the latter part of the season, equaling Moss's 38 for four wins, one second-place finish, and no sixth race finish. The championship was decided by the fastest lap points: 4 of 5 fastest laps were counted for Hawthorn, and all 3 of Moss's, leaving Hawthorn with 42 (of 49 earned) points, and Moss with 41.

The 1958 season also saw a woman driving in Formula One for the first time with Maria Teresa de Filippis racing a private Maserati at the Belgian Grand Prix. (Note: Women had driven in Grands Prix prior to Formula One, e.g. Hellé Nice.)

==== 1959 ====
The 1959 season saw a surge in the use of mid-engine designs, and this season saw fierce competition between the works Cooper of Australian Jack Brabham and the private Cooper of Rob Walker driven by Moss. The Getrag-modified Citroën Traction Avant transaxle proved to be a tough competitor for the Coopers, so Walker switched to a transaxle manufactured by ex-Maserati engineer Valerio Colotti. The special transmission turned out to be more unreliable than the standard part, and Brabham took the title with Moss second.

==== 1960 ====
In 1960, Brabham in the Cooper-Climax dominated the F1 season, Moss in the Lotus won also, and eyes were on F2 races to see what the future would bring when capacity was reduced from 2500c in 1960 to 1500cc from 1961 onwards.

Enzo Ferrari adopted a conservative attitude, claiming "the horses pull the car rather than push it." It was probably disinformation: at the same time Ferrari was preparing for 1961 by designing mid-engined F2 and F1 cars. The Italian front-engined red cars were not only being effectively beaten by the British teams but thoroughly outclassed – the British rear mid-engined cars had considerably better road holding than the front-engined cars. Although down on power, the British cars' superior handling and lesser demands on tyres more than made up the power deficit. It was clear that rear-mid engined cars were the way to go at that point in time; Lotus and BRM soon introduced mid-engined machines. Walker's team switched to a Lotus 18 chassis. Moss gave Lotus its first Formula One victory at Monaco but his season was ruined by a serious crash at Spa-Francorchamps. Brabham took a second title with his Cooper, but Moss returned in time to win the final race of the season, the US Grand Prix at Riverside, California.

The mid-engined revolution, together with downsizing of the engines, rendered another potentially revolutionary car concept obsolete. The front-engined four-wheel drive Ferguson P99 raced in British Formula One races up to 1961, winning the non-Championship 1961 Oulton Park International Gold Cup under heavy rain. Compared to the new breed of mid-engined machines that had good traction and a limited-slip differential, the front-engine 4WD car was too heavy and complex. In a front engine single seater with rear-wheel drive, the driver has to sit on the drive shaft, or next to an asymmetric drive train. While adding front wheel drive to a front-engine car can be considered simple, adding it to a modern rear-mid engine monoposto would re-introduce the problem of bypassing the driver. (Later in the 1960s, when F1 and Indycars had more power, with 3 litre engines, turbos and turbines, Lotus, Matra, Cosworth, and others tried to race 4WD cars, but by then it was wings and slick tyres that provided additional grip, making 4WD a problem, not a solution.)

Ferrari had developed the 65° V6 Ferrari Dino engine for the front-engined 1957 Dino 156 F2. A larger version of the engine debuted as the Scuderia's first mid-engined monoposto Ferrari 246 P at the 1960 Monaco Grand Prix. Fitted with the small F2 engine, now a Ferrari 156 P, and driven by Wolfgang von Trips, the chassis spoiled Porsche's home race by winning the 1960 Solitude Non-championship F2 race. The F2 also had to endure the 1960 Italian Grand Prix that was run on the banked oval to give the front engine Ferrari 246 F1, winless in 1960, a last chance for victory. Most British teams boycotted the race, and Ferrari won with ease.

==== 1961 ====
By 1961, British specialist teams such as Lotus, Cooper and BRM, and later McLaren, Tyrrell and Williams – small organizations created purely for producing, developing and competing very few purpose-built open-wheel racing cars – had overtaken the larger industrial manufacturing powers such as Ferrari, Mercedes, Maserati and Alfa Romeo. The only major automotive manufacturer with a full works effort was Ferrari, which was really a manufacturer that made road cars to fund its racing in F1 and endurance racing. Whereas the big continental manufacturers with plenty of funds built the whole car including the drivetrains themselves, the British teams, having limited budgets, only built their chassis; they bought their engines and gearboxes from independent manufacturers such as Coventry-Climax and later Ford-badged Cosworth engines, and Hewland gearboxes. The only British team that was also a manufacturer of road cars like Ferrari was Lotus; but even so, that company never grew to the size of Mercedes or Alfa Romeo, or even Porsche, which pulled out of Formula One after 1962. From 1957 to 1961, Formula One had transformed from a scattershot sideshow of industrial technology to a competitive business for team owners and engineers wanting to come up with new technologies to out-do the opposition, and also to sell their technology to big manufacturers or other interested parties. These new British teams were regularly beating manufacturer teams like Ferrari, whose founder Enzo Ferrari referred to as garagistes – Italian for 'garage teams', which is effectively how all these British teams operated: their cars were built in small sheds or garages.

1960 had been the last year with 2500cc engines, as for 1961, in an attempt to curb speeds, Formula One downgraded from 2.5-litre supercharged engines to 1.5-litre non-supercharged engines. As a result, even the 1500cc Porsche 718, which started as a sportscar, and had been entered in F2 races and selected F1 GPs, now could run a whole GP season without being an underdog based on engine size only.

The 1500cc Formula One would last five years, until a sudden "return to power" in 1966. Forced induction by supercharger, common from the 1920s to 1951, was still an option, but since 1954 limited to 750cc, and no one seriously considered the option, as supercharging had proven limiting to fuel consumption. Turbochargers were mainly used in diesels, but soon appeared in US cars like the Corvair. Turbos dominate Indy racing since the 1968 Indy 500.

For 1961, Ferrari could have used its already proven 156P, but preferred to go two steps forward, by designing a very sophisticated smaller chassis, the Ferrari 156 F1 "shark nose". In addition, the Scuderia produced a lower 120° V6, and the considerably more powerful and efficient engine led to the Maranello outfit dominating the 1961 season as the British teams scrambled to come up with a suitable engine as existing F2 power trains proved to be a stopgap only. American Phil Hill won the 1961 title in a works Ferrari. His teammate, Wolfgang von Trips of Germany, died along with 14 spectators in a horrific crash on the first lap of the Italian Grand Prix at Monza.

Throughout the 1950s and 1960s, the Formula One World Championship was merely the tip of the iceberg when it came to races run to Formula One regulations. The total number of races run to Formula One regulations remained about the same as it had been before the introduction of the World Championship. Many famous races, such as the Pau and Syracuse Grands Prix, the BRDC International Trophy, the Race of Champions and the Oulton Park Gold Cup, were not part of the World Championship, but nonetheless continued to draw top drivers and teams to compete for prize money and fame.

=== Anglophone drivers and 1.5-litre engines (1962–1967) ===
See 1962 season, 1963 season, 1964 season, 1965 season, 1966 season and 1967 season.

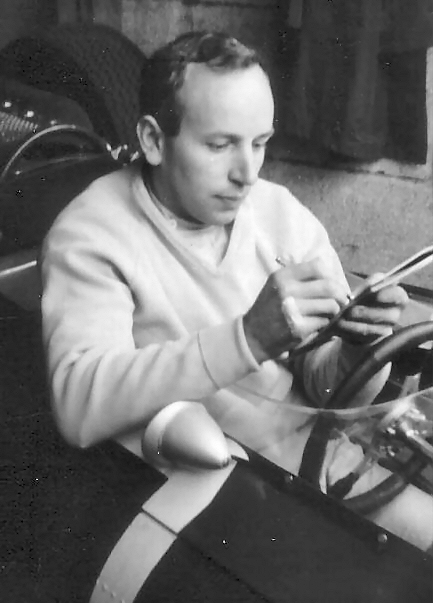
John Surtees (Ferrari) at the 1964 British Grand Prix

In 1962, the Lotus team ran the Lotus 25 powered by the new Coventry-Climax FWMV V8 engine. The car had an aluminium sheet monocoque chassis instead of the traditional spaceframe design. This proved to be the greatest technological breakthrough since the introduction of mid-engined cars, but the Lotus was unreliable at first. Jim Clark finished second for Lotus that year, leaving the title to Graham Hill and his new V8-powered BRM.

As soon as the car and the engine became reliable, the era of the Lotus and of Jim Clark began. Clark won the title twice in three years, 1963 and 1965, the latter being the only occasion to date of a driver winning both the Championship and the Indianapolis 500-Mile Race in the same year. For 1964 Lotus introduced the new Lotus 33, while Ferrari made considerable technological and financial effort to win the title. Ferrari used no less than three different engines in the season – the existing V6, a V8 and a flat-12, while Lotus was struggling with the teething troubles of a new car. The title went to John Surtees and Ferrari. Surtees's title was especially notable, as he became the only driver ever to win the World Championship for both cars and motorcycles. The 1965 Mexican Grand Prix, the last race of the 1.5-litre engine era, saw Richie Ginther give Honda its first victory at the end of the second season for the Japanese newcomer. This was the first victory by a Japanese car and, as of today, the only one by a car powered by a transverse engine.

1966 saw a 'Return to Power' as Formula One changed the engine rules once again, allowing either 3.0-litre naturally aspirated engines, or 1.5-litre supercharged or forced induction engines. 1966 was a transitional year for most teams, and it also saw the first use of composite materials, a technology which would later revolutionise the sport. The McLaren M2B, designed by Robin Herd, used an aluminium-wood laminate known as Mallite for much of its monocoque, although the car's design did not make best use of the new material. Given the shift to 1500 cc forced induction, it is surprising that any teams did not seriously consider fielding turbocharged versions of their 1500 cc naturally aspirated engines at that point; Coventry Climax had considered it for their FWMW flat 16, but the company had decided to end its Formula 1 racing activities and the idea stopped there. It would be eleven years before a team exploited the 1500 cc forced induction option again.

The Ferrari 312 used a 3-litre version of Ferrari's well-tested, powerful V12 engine design, but the chassis was very heavy. An enlarged V6 held some promise, but Surtees left mid-season after a dispute with team manager Eugenio Dragoni at the 24 Hours of Le Mans. Coventry-Climax, former supplier to much of the field, pulled out of the sport, leaving teams like Lotus to struggle with enlarged versions of obsolete Climax engines. Cooper turned to a development of an otherwise obsolete Maserati V12 that was originally designed for the Maserati 250 F in the late 1950s, while BRM made the choice to design an incredibly heavy and complex H-16. Jack Brabham and his eponymous racing team stood to benefit from this situation, and took victory two years running with a light and compact spaceframe chassis powered by the aluminium-block stock-derived Repco-Brabham V8 unit. With SOHC heads and no more than 330 bhp, (Note: Probably 285 bhp (213 kW) at its beginning and 330 bhp (250 kW) at final stage of development.) the Repco was one of the least powerful of the new 3-litre engines, but unlike the others it was light, reliable, and available right from the start of the new regulation cycle. Brabham himself took the championship in 1966, while 1967 went to his teammate, New Zealander Denny Hulme, as Jack tried new parts on his car.

In 1967, Lotus introduced the Lotus 49, powered by the Ford-Cosworth DFV V-8 engine that was to dominate Formula One for the next decade. Like the Repco, the Cosworth was light and compact, but it used 4-valve DOHC heads and delivered much more power. Cosworth had aimed for 400 bhp (300 kW) and exceeded this when the engine first ran. The DFV was designed to be fully stressed (an idea pioneered by the Lancia D50). This allowed Chapman to design a monocoque that ended just after the driver's seat while the Brabham were still using a classic tubular frame that supported the engine, gearbox, and rear suspension wishbones. The newborn DFV suffered from frequent failures due to excessive vibration from the flat-plane crank, forcing Keith Duckworth to redesign several parts and allowing Hulme to win the World Drivers' Crown on reliability.

1967 also saw a remarkable result by Rhodesian driver John Love with a 2.7-litre four-cylinder Cooper-Climax. Love, who was in his forties and although seen as one of the finest drivers in Southern Africa was not a major star, led and finished second in that year's South African Grand Prix. Love's obsolete Cooper was originally designed for the short races of the Tasman Series; to run a full Grand Prix, Love added two auxiliary fuel tanks. Unfortunately, the auxiliary tank's fuel pump failed and forced him to refuel after having led most of the race.

By the late 1960s, overseas races outside Europe formed about a third of the championship in any year. The core of the season remained the European season run over the Northern Hemisphere summer, with overseas races usually falling at the start or end of the season, a pattern which has continued to this day. There were also a number of non-championship races run outside Europe; the South African Grand Prix was occasionally one of these. Native English-speaking drivers dominated the racing scene in the 1960s, most of them British. Britons Graham Hill, Jim Clark, John Surtees and Jackie Stewart won 7 championships combined in that decade; Australian Jack Brabham won 2 championships; New Zealander Denny Hulme won a championship in 1967; and American Phil Hill won a championship in 1961. In addition, the British teams dominated the racing scene during this period, with British-built Cooper, BRM, Lotus, Brabham and McLaren cars as well as French-built Matra cars entered by the British privateer team Matra International of Ken Tyrrell.

=== DFV engine, 12-cylinder engines, and the arrival of sponsorship, safety, and aerodynamics (1968–1976) ===
See 1968 season, 1969 season, 1970 season, 1971 season, 1972 season, 1973 season, 1974 season, 1975 season and 1976 season.

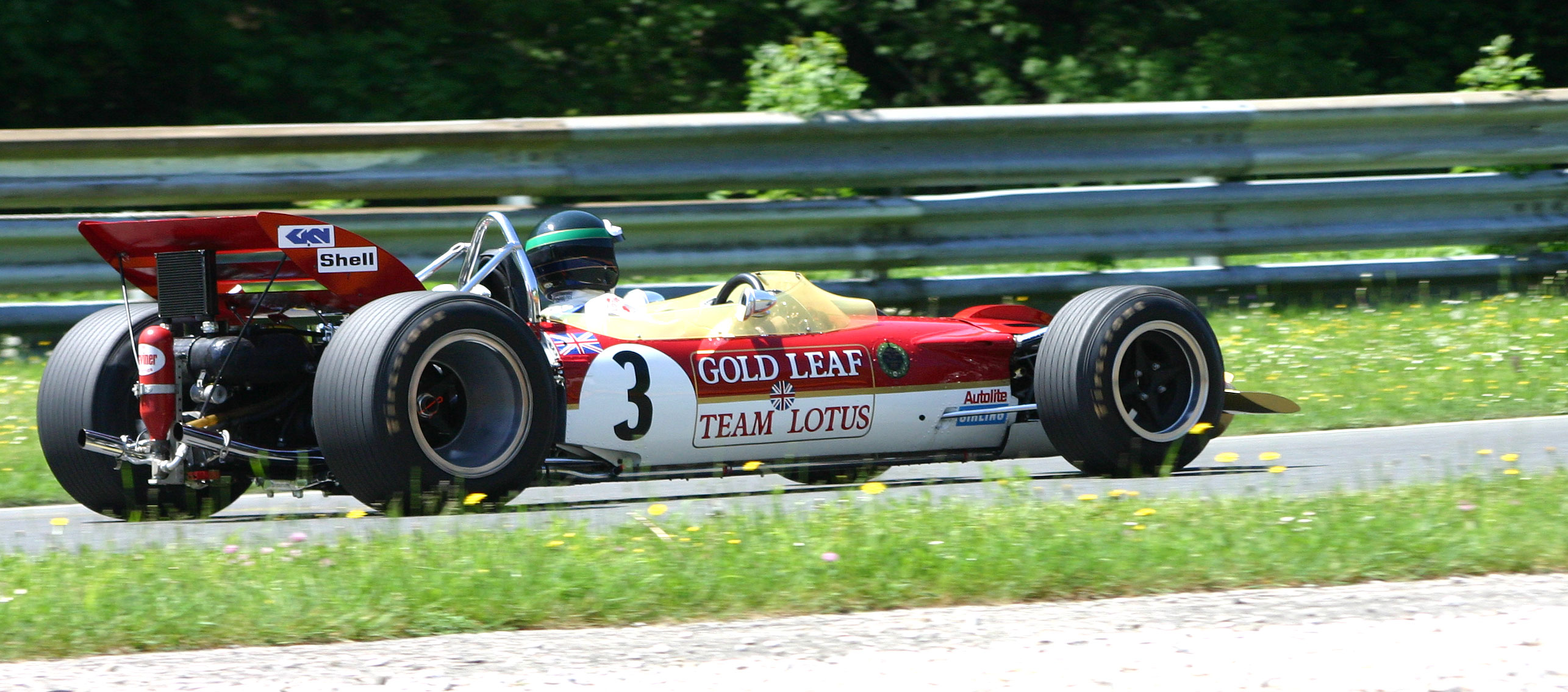
The Lotus 49, the second F1 car to appear in a sponsor's livery, at a demonstration run in 2005

In 1968, Lotus lost its exclusive right to use the DFV. McLaren built a DFV-powered car and a new force appeared on the scene when Ken Tyrrell entered his team using Cosworth-powered French Matra chassis driven by ex-BRM Jackie Stewart as lead driver. Clark took his last win at the 1968 season opening South African Grand Prix. On 7 April 1968, the double champion was killed at Hockenheim in a Formula Two event.

The season saw three significant innovations. The first was the arrival of unrestricted sponsorship, which the FIA decided to permit that year after the withdrawal of support from automobile related firms like BP, Shell and Firestone. Team Gunston, a South African privateer team, was the first Formula One team to paint their cars in the livery of their sponsors when they entered a private Brabham for John Love, painted in the colours of Gunston cigarettes, in the 1968 South African Grand Prix. In the next round at the 1968 Spanish Grand Prix, Team Lotus, initially using the British racing green, became the first works team to follow this example, with Graham Hill's Lotus 49B entered in the Red, Gold and White colors of the Imperial Tobacco's Gold Leaf brand.

The second innovation was the introduction of wings as seen previously on various cars including the Chaparral 2F sports car. Colin Chapman introduced modest front wings and a spoiler on Graham Hill's Lotus 49B at the 1968 Monaco Grand Prix. Brabham and Ferrari went one better at the 1968 Belgian Grand Prix with full width wings mounted on struts high above the driver. Lotus replied with a full-width wing directly connected to the rear suspension that required a redesign of suspension wishbones and transmission shafts. Matra then produced a high mounted front wing connected to the front suspension. This last innovation was mostly used during practice as it required a lot of effort from the driver. By the end of the season, most teams were using sophisticated wings. There were several cases of wings, struts, or even suspension collapsing.

Lastly, the third innovation was the introduction of a full-face helmet for drivers, with Dan Gurney becoming the first driver to wear such helmet at the 1968 German Grand Prix. Lotus won both titles in 1968 with Graham Hill with Stewart second.

1968 was the year that former double World Champion Jim Clark died in a Formula 2 race in Germany. This was a tragedy for the sport and many of its fans and within the next few years, many of the drivers campaigned for more safety at races to stop more deaths from happening. The 1968 Matra's most innovative feature was the use of aviation-inspired structural fuel tanks but the FIA decided to ban the technology for 1970. For 1969 Matra made the radical decision to withdraw its works team and build a new car using structural tanks for the Tyrrell team, even though it would be eligible for only a single season. The 1969 season started with cars using larger and more sophisticated wings than the previous year. When both Lotus cars broke their wings' struts and crashed at the Spanish Grand Prix, the FIA banned wings for the next race at Monaco. They were reintroduced later in the season but were to be restricted in size and height and attached directly to the chassis in a fixed position.

Safety became a major issue in Formula One and the Belgian Grand Prix at Spa did not take place as the drivers boycotted the circuit after safety upgrades were not installed as demanded. Stewart won the 1969 title easily with the new Matra MS80, a spectacular achievement from a constructor and a team that had only entered Formula One the previous year. It remains the only title won by a chassis built in France. 1969 also saw a brief resurgence of interest in four-wheel drive with a record of four such cars on the field at the British Grand Prix. Johnny Servoz-Gavin became the one and the only driver to score a point with a 4WD, finishing sixth with the Matra MS84 at the Canadian Grand Prix, although the front wheel transmission was actually disconnected. Wide tyres and downforce had proved to be better means of increasing grip, and the technology was largely abandoned. Jacky Ickx finished second in the championship for Brabham, competitive again after dropping its Repco engines in favour of the DFV.

For 1970 Tyrrell was asked by Matra to use their V12, but decided to retain the Cosworth instead. As Matra was now a Chrysler affiliate and Tyrrell derived much of its income from Ford and Elf (associated with Renault) the partnership ended. Ken Tyrrell bought March 701 chassis as an interim solution while developing his own car for the next season. The new wedge-shaped Lotus 72 was a very innovative car featuring variable flexibility torsion bar suspension, hip-mounted radiators, inboard front brakes, and an overhanging rear wing. The 72 originally had suspension problems, but once resolved the car quickly showed its superiority, and Lotus's new leader, the Austrian Jochen Rindt, dominated the championship until he was killed at Monza when a brake shaft broke. He took the 1970 title posthumously for Lotus. 1970 saw the introduction of slick tyres by Goodyear. Ferrari's new flat-12 engine proved to be more powerful than the Ford-Cosworth DFV; but slightly heavier. Their performance started to improve at the end of that season, and Belgian Jacky Ickx won 3 races- but this proved to not be enough to overhaul Rindt's points total; Ickx later said he was happy to not have won the championship that year.

After Rindt's death, the Lotus team had a desultory 1971 season with its two new and inexperienced drivers – Emerson Fittipaldi and Reine Wisell. The team spent a lot of time experimenting with a gas turbine powered car, and with four-wheel drive again. After Jack Brabham's retirement, his old team went into a steep decline. Using their own chassis heavily inspired by the Matra MS80 but with conventional tanks, Tyrrell and Stewart easily took success in 1971. Focusing again on the type 72 chassis, now fielded in John Player Special's black and gold livery, Lotus took the 1972 championship by surprise with 25-year-old Brazilian driver Emerson Fittipaldi becoming the then youngest world champion. Stewart came second, his performance compromised by a stomach ulcer.

In 1973, Lotus teammates Fittipaldi and Ronnie Peterson raced each other while Stewart was supported by François Cevert at Tyrrell. Stewart took the Drivers' title, but then at the final race of the season, the United States Grand Prix at Watkins Glen, Cevert crashed during Saturday practice in the notorious esses and was killed instantly. Stewart, temporary hire Chris Amon, and Tyrrell withdrew from the race effectively handing the Constructors' title to Lotus. At the end of the season, Stewart made public his decision to retire, a decision that was already made before the U.S. Grand Prix.

McLaren, having fully recovered from the death of its founder, ended the 1973 season with three wins and several poles. The new M23, an updated interpretation of the Lotus 72 concept, appeared to many as the best design on the field. Fittipaldi made the choice to leave Lotus for McLaren that offered him true lead driver status that Chapman refused to him.

The 1974 season went to pre-season favourites McLaren and Fittipaldi but was a far closer result than expected. Ferrari bounced back from a dismal 1973 season with its first true monocoque cars, the flat-12 powered 312 B3s driven by young Austrian Niki Lauda and the experienced Clay Regazzoni. Despite the failure of the new Lotus 76, Peterson managed to win Grands Prix with the four-year-old 72. Brabham driver Carlos Reutemann was also able to win with the new BT44 and young talent Jody Scheckter ended most of the races in the points, including winning the Swedish Grand Prix with the M23-lookalike Tyrrell 007. Lauda's season fizzled out after a crash on the first lap of the German Grand Prix. Only the last race of the season decided the Drivers' title between Fittipaldi, Regazzoni, and Scheckter.

By this time the innovations introduced by the Lotus 49 and 72 had changed car design. Fully stressed engine and variable flexibility suspension was now the norm, most cars had wedge shaped bodywork and airboxes towered over driver's heads. The main innovation of this era came in 1975, when the Ferrari 312T appeared, its transverse gearbox allowing better weight distribution.

Ferrari won the Constructors titles in 1975, 1976, and 1977. Lauda took a relatively straightforward first Drivers' title in 1975. The main surprise of the season came when the tiny Hesketh team won the Dutch Grand Prix with James Hunt. Despite entering only one car and refusing sponsorship the team finished 4th in the Constructors' Championship. That year also saw Lella Lombardi score the first points by a woman in Formula One for 6th place at the Spanish Grand Prix.

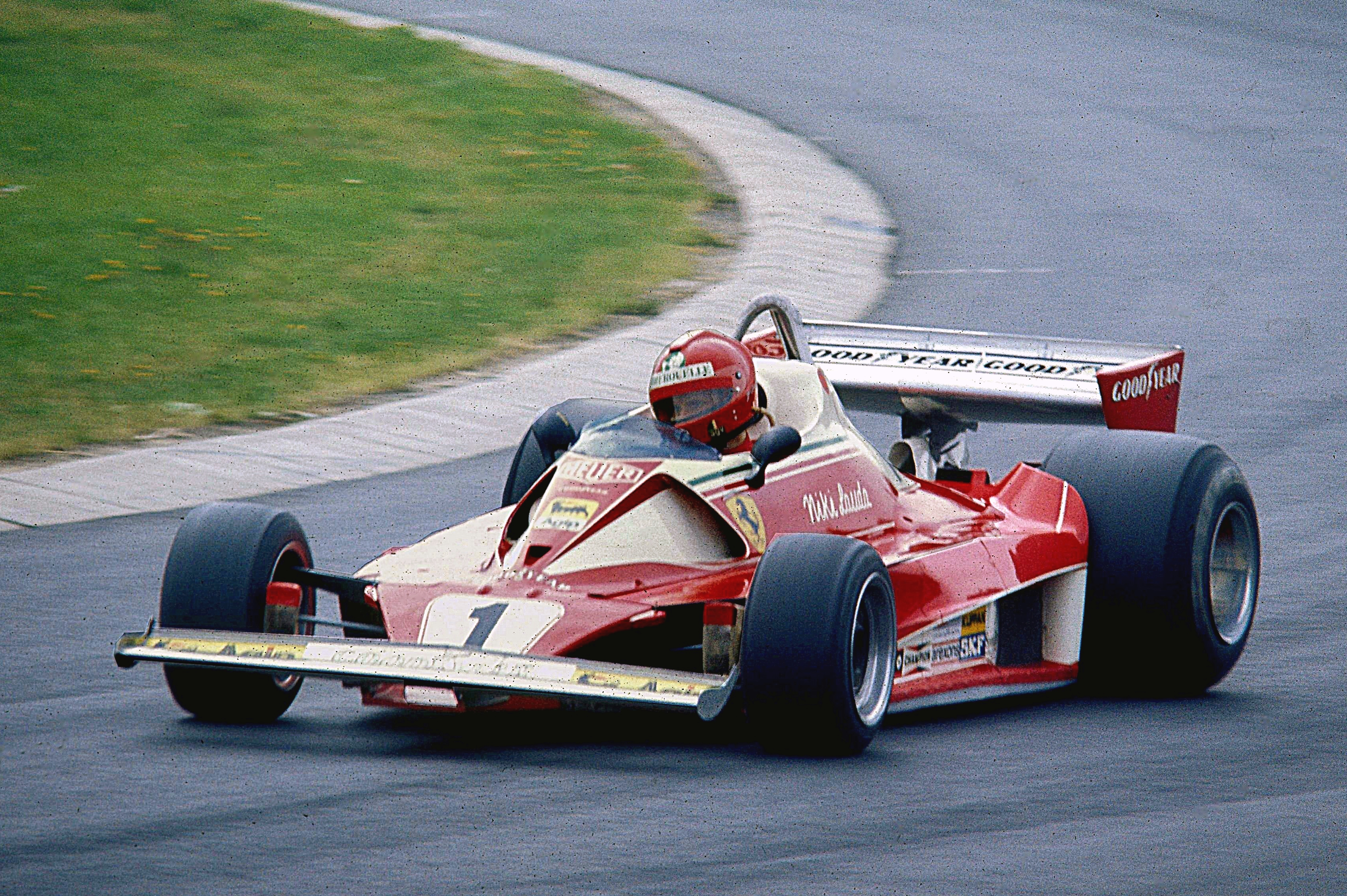
Niki Lauda practicing at the Nürburgring during the 1976 German Grand Prix

For 1976, Fittipaldi made the surprising decision to drive for the Brazilian Fittipaldi Automotive team of his brother Wilson, sponsored by Copersucar. James Hunt, who knew that Hesketh's future was doomed by its lack of sponsorship (Lord Hesketh had tried to obtain major backing once he realised Hunt was a likely title contender and that he could no longer afford to run the team out of his own pocket), signed for McLaren. In 1976 Lauda's second successive title seemed inevitable until he crashed on the second lap at the Nürburgring, suffering severe burns as well as lung and blood damage. He was given the last rites but unbelievably was back in his Ferrari six weeks later. He lost the championship by a single point to James Hunt in heavy rain at the final round at Fuji in Japan when he pitted his car and refused to continue, declaring that the risk was too great and that from now on he would refuse to race under extreme conditions.

The most radical innovation of 1976 was the 6-wheeled Tyrrell P34. The P34 was a good car, often finishing third or fourth and winning the Swedish Grand Prix, but it was not superior to the best 4-wheeled cars. 1976 also saw the Lotus team fitting brushes or plastic skirts under its rather uncompetitive 77; McLaren and Brabham also experimented with air-dams and splitters in an attempt to cause low-pressure areas under the car but found no significant effect on performance, in fact, nobody knew what was in Chapman's mind.

=== Ground-effect era (1977–1982) ===
See 1977 season, 1978 season, 1979 season, 1980 season, 1981 season and 1982 season.

1977 also saw two radical technical innovations that would change the future of Formula One. The purpose of Lotus's experimentation in 1976 was revealed with the Lotus 78, which brought ground effect to Formula One for the first time, using wing-profiled sidepods sealed to the ground by sliding lexan skirts. Generating radically increased downforce with significantly less drag, (Note: Reportedly, the internal name of the project that gave birth to 78 was "Something for nothing", Lotus external consultant Peter Wright, one of the designers of the 1970 March 701, brought the idea.) the Lotus 78s driven by Mario Andretti and Gunnar Nilsson won five Grands Prix in 1977. Renault unveiled the second when their RS01 made its first appearance powered by a 1.5-litre turbocharged engine, derived from their sportscar unit. Although supercharged engines were successful in the 1950s and the regulations allowing for turbocharged engines had existed for 11 years, no Formula One team had built one, feeling that the fuel consumption and turbo lag (boost lag) would negate its superior power. Motor engineer Bernard Dudot, who had observed the turbocharged Offenhauser engines used in Indy car racing in the US, pushed for this choice.

The entry of Renault also brought Michelin's radial tyres to Formula One. Goodyear, who enjoyed a monopoly before the entry of Michelin, was still using the cross ply design for racing. Goodyear saw the entry of Michelin as a serious threat and made a notable effort in research and development to develop its own radial tyres. Tyrrell's 1977 season was disastrous because Goodyear was too busy to continue to develop the unique small tyres required by the P34. Without continuing development, the tyres became less competitive and the six-wheeled concept had to be dropped. Michelin eventually left F1 after the 1984 season.

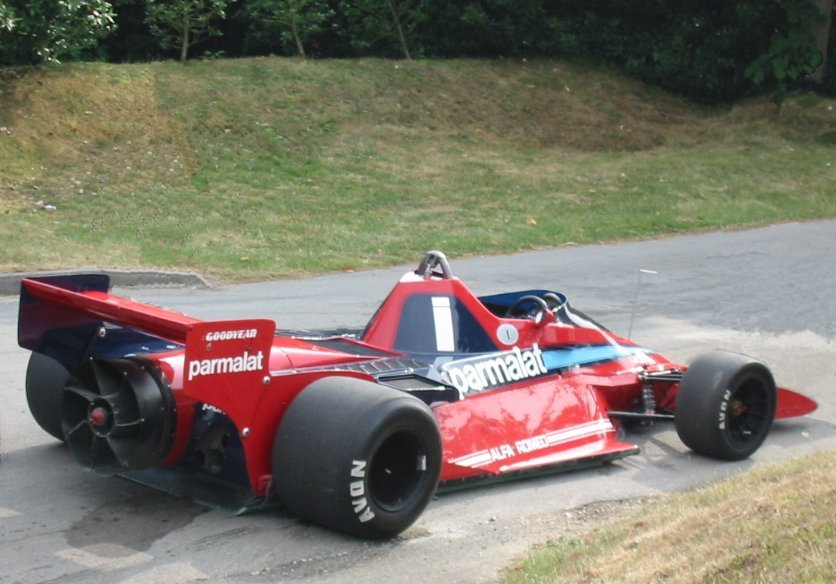
The Brabham BT46B "fan car"

For 1978 the new Lotus 79 made more radical and mature use of the ground effect concept. Many other teams began experimenting with the technology, but Lotus had a head start and Mario Andretti won the Championship in the "Black Beauty", becoming the first driver to win both the American IndyCar championship and the Formula One title. Brabham outbid Lotus in generating downforce with BT46B "fan car", a revival of the "sucker car" concept used by Jim Hall's Chaparral 2J in the Can-Am series in the early 1970s. The car exploited a loophole in the regulations, but the team, led by Bernie Ecclestone who had recently become president of the Formula One Constructors Association, withdrew the car before it had a chance to be banned after winning its only race with Niki Lauda at the wheel at the Swedish Grand Prix. Late in the season, Ronnie Peterson crashed into the barriers in the first lap at Monza and his Lotus burst into flames. James Hunt heroically pulled him out of the car and the medical prognosis was initially good but the Swede died the next day because of an embolism. Hunt would retire after the following season's Monaco Grand Prix.

For 1979 Ligier, the up-and-coming Williams team and surprisingly Ferrari, despite the handicap of the Flat-12 that obstructed wind tunnels, produced wing-cars designs that were more effective than the Lotus 79. This forced Lotus to hastily introduce the new 80 that overplayed the ground effect concept (it was originally intended to run with no drag-inducing wings, merely ground-effect sidepods) and never proved competitive. Renault persisted with the turbo engine, despite frequent breakdowns that resulted in the nickname of the 'Little Yellow Teapot', and finally won for the first time at Dijon in 1979 with the RS10 that featured both ground effect and turbo engine.

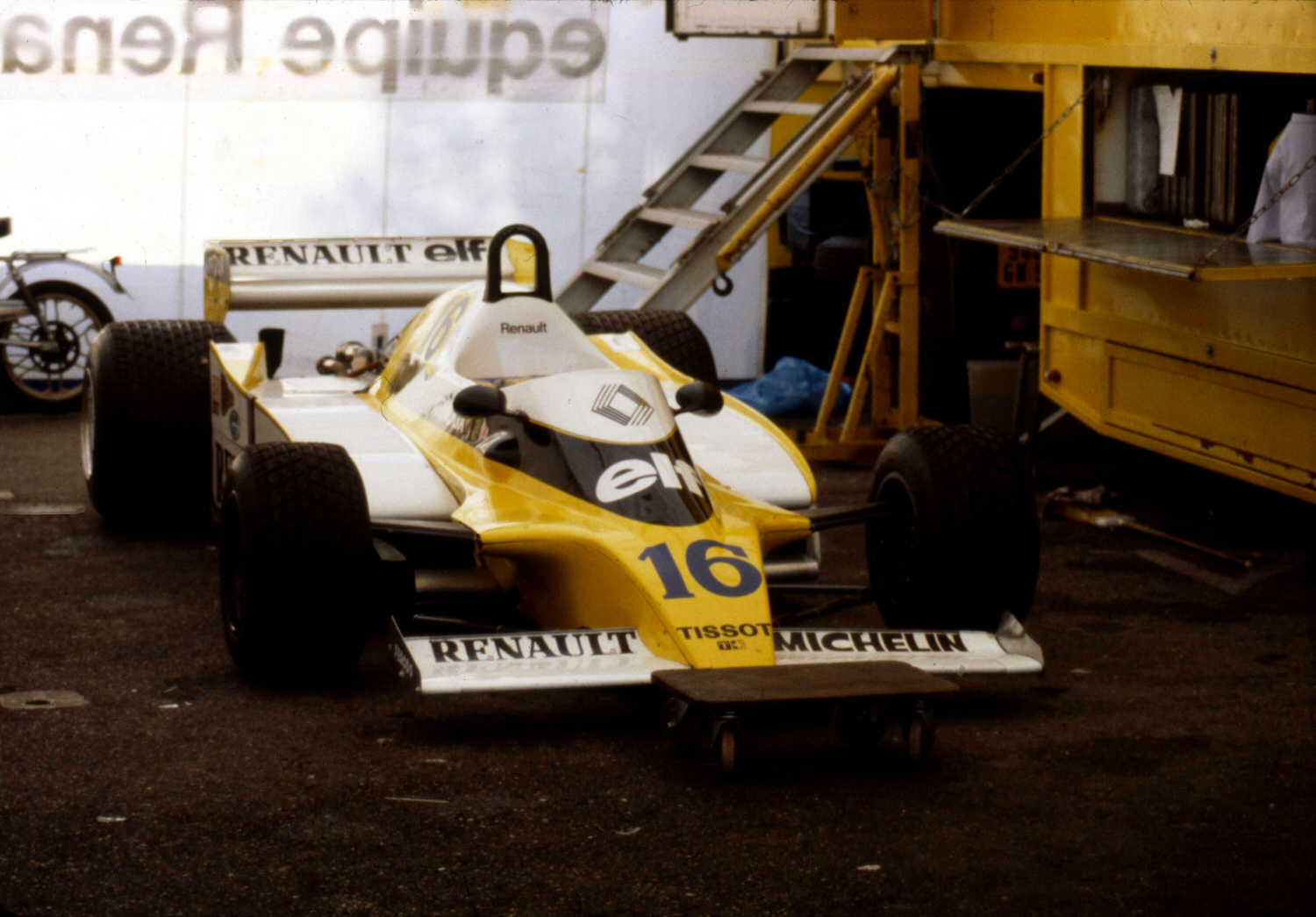
The Renault RS10, the first turbocharged car to win a Grand Prix, had ground-effect aerodynamics permitted in 1979

The new technologies introduced by Renault and Lotus became entangled in the FISA–FOCA war of the early 1980s. Turbo engines were complex machines whose layout limited the ground effect 'tunnels' under the car. They were an emerging technology and so they were difficult and expensive to develop and build and make reliable. It was mostly manufacturer-supported teams, such as Renault, Ferrari, and Alfa Romeo which took that route. In contrast, the cheap, reliable, and narrow Ford-Cosworth DFV engine, still used by most teams more than a decade after its introduction, lent itself well to highly efficient ground effect aerodynamics. These two groups were represented by two political bodies – the sport's governing body FISA, headed by Jean-Marie Balestre; and FOCA, headed up by Bernie Ecclestone. The first group supported a strict limitation of ground effect to gain full advantage from their powerful turbos while the other relied on unrestricted ground effect to balance their horsepower deficit. There were also financial considerations. Faced with large constructors with unrestricted budgets, the smaller constructors wanted a larger share of Formula One's income to remain competitive.

The battles between FISA and FOCA during the first years of the 1980s overshadowed the events on track. Jody Scheckter took Ferrari's last title for 21 years in 1979, but attention there was already being focused on young Canadian Gilles Villeneuve. Alan Jones and Keke Rosberg brought success to Frank Williams at last in 1980 and 1982, while young Brazilian Nelson Piquet won titles for Brabham team owner Ecclestone in 1981 and 1983.

Patrick Depailler was killed in 1980, probably due to high lateral acceleration causing a black out in Hockenheim's fast Ostkurve. The double blow struck to Ferrari in 1982, of the death of Gilles Villeneuve and the crippling injury to teammate Didier Pironi only a few weeks later, helped bring this crisis into the spotlight, and helped both sides settle the dispute for the good of the sport.

The old fashioned DFV helped make the UK domestic Aurora Formula One series possible between 1978 and 1980. As in South Africa a generation before, second hand cars from manufacturers like Lotus and Fittipaldi Automotive were the order of the day, although some, such as the March 781, were built specifically for the series. In 1980 the series saw South African Desiré Wilson become the only woman to win a Formula One race when she triumphed at Brands Hatch in a Williams in a non-championship event.

After several years in darkness McLaren merged with Ron Dennis's Formula Two Project-4 team. The McLaren MP4/1 (McLaren Project-4) introduced the first carbon fiber composite chassis in 1981, an innovation which, despite initial doubts over its likely performance in a crash, had been taken up by all the teams by the middle of the decade. The use of carbon fibre composite in place of aluminium honeycomb produced cars that were significantly lighter, yet also far stiffer which improved grip and therefore cornering speed. Significant skepticism regarding the use of carbon fiber chassis remained, but John Watson's 1981 crash in the MP4/1 showed that the new technology was sufficiently safe, with the violent accident leaving Watson unscathed, where similar previous incidents had resulted in death or serious injury.

=== 1.5-litre turbo-charged engines (1983–1988) ===
See 1983 season, 1984 season, 1985 season, 1986 season, 1987 season and 1988 season.

The 1983 drivers' title, won by Piquet for the BMW-powered Brabham team of Bernie Ecclestone, was the first-ever won by a turbocharged engine. By 1983, the dispute between FISA and FOCA had been resolved and although FOCA emerged with the stronger hand, the teams had seen the writing on the wall. Renault had proven in 1979 and 1980 that turbo-charged engines were a more efficient means of getting more performance from the powertrain with the FIA regulations. The turbo cars were faster on almost all of the high speed (Hockenheim, Österreichring, Monza, Silverstone) and high-altitude tracks (Interlagos, Kyalami), but by 1982, the turbo cars were fastest just about everywhere. The 1982 season made it obvious to all the competing Formula One teams that turbocharged engines were the way to go if anyone wanted to be competitive in Formula 1. By 1983, the reliability of the turbo-charged engines had been ironed out and made more reliable, and in 1984, only Tyrrell still struggled on with the old DFV engines. 1983 also saw the last non-championship Formula One race: The 1983 Race of Champions at Brands Hatch, won by reigning World Champion Keke Rosberg in a Williams-Ford/Cosworth in a close fight with American Danny Sullivan.

After nearly 50 years the power achieved by the turbocharged cars could finally match the 640 hp (477 kW) produced by the supercharged 1937 Mercedes-Benz W125, without a huge consumption of special fuel. By 1986, some engines were producing over 1,350 bhp (1,010 kW) in short bursts in qualifying. BMW's 1,000 bhp (750 kW) dynamometer was incapable of measuring the output of their qualifying engines – Paul Rosche estimated that it might be as much as 1,400 bhp (1,000 kW). First fuel consumption and then turbocharger boost were restricted to 4-bar in 1987 and 1.5-bar in 1988. By 1988, the turbos were only slightly more powerful than the lighter 3.5-litre naturally aspirated cars that had been introduced the previous year. The thirsty turbo engines briefly saw refuelling introduced into the sport, but this was banned for 1984.

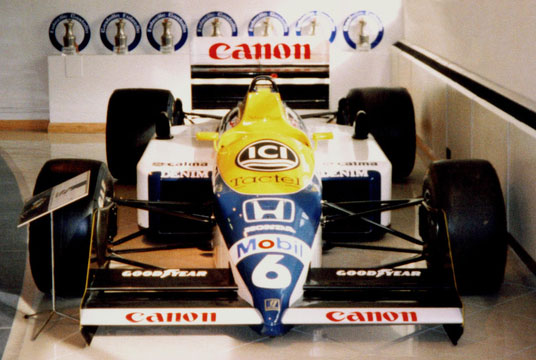
Williams-Honda won the Constructors' Championship in 1986, the only year before 2014 in which every car in the field had a turbocharged engine

With controversy at last left behind, the Formula One teams flourished through the remainder of the 1980s and into the 1990s. Despite the overwhelming dominance of some teams during some seasons, this period is regarded (perhaps ironically) as one of the brightest spots in F1's history. Niki Lauda, coming out of retirement for a hefty sum in 1982, pipped his teammate Alain Prost to the title in 1984 by a mere half-point, the closest ever finish in Formula One history. That half-point in itself was controversial in that it came at the rain-shortened Grand Prix of Monaco, which resulted in half points, Prost won the race, but Ayrton Senna made the stronger impression in his Toleman car by finishing 2nd and rapidly closing on Prost, It was the start of a rivalry between the two men that would continue for nearly a decade. But in the early years, Prost held the advantage, driving for the McLaren team with the Porsche-built TAG turbo engine which took three world titles in a row.

1986 provided another close finish. The Honda-powered Williams cars of Nelson Piquet and Nigel Mansell looked untouchable, but too often they took points from each other, allowing McLaren's Prost to stay in touch. Although Williams easily won the Constructors' Championship that year, it was not until the season-ending Grand Prix of Australia that the Drivers' title was decided, Prost making the most of both Williams drivers tyre problems. 1987 saw the Williams grow only stronger, with Piquet driving more consistent races to take his 3rd title ahead of Mansell who crashed in Japan in practice forcing him to sit out for the final 2 races.

1987 also saw the return of atmospheric engines to Formula One, after the turbo-only year of 1986. Capacity was increased to 3.5 litres, and the turbo engines were restricted in boost pressure and fuel capacity to limit their effect, with a total ban to be introduced in 1989. Nevertheless, while turbo engines lasted, they dominated, with Williams-Honda winning easily in 1987, and then Honda teaming up with McLaren in 1988 that resulted in the super-team of Prost and Senna winning 15 of 16 races, a record beaten only by Red Bull Racing in 2023. It was Senna who emerged the victor, claiming the first of his three World Titles.

=== 3.5-litre naturally-aspirated engines, active suspension, and electronic driver aids (1989–1993) ===
See 1989 season, 1990 season, 1991 season, 1992 season and 1993 season.

In 1989, turbos were banned and new regulations allowing only naturally aspirated engines up to 3.5 litres were put in their place. The dominance of McLaren-Honda continued for the next 3 seasons, Prost winning the title in 1989, Senna in 1990 and 1991. The V10 and V12 engines produced by the Japanese manufacturer proved to be just as good as the turbo V6s before them, and the V10 was the best engine over the two seasons it was used and developed by Honda. The championship was marred however by the fierce rivalry between the two men, culminating in a pair of clashes at the Japanese Grands Prix of 1989 and 1990. They both dominated Formula One from 1988 to 1990, winning 37 of the 48 Grand Prix staged and each scoring almost twice as many points as the third-place driver in those championships. In 1989 Prost 'closed the door' on his overtaking teammate while Senna later freely admitted to deliberately driving into Prost in the 1990 race, drawing stiff condemnation from all quarters of Formula One. Senna, however, was more concerned with the threat (and opportunity) afforded by the resurgent Williams, now powered by Renault (the French giant's innovative engine technology resulted in major progress) and designed by aerodynamics genius Adrian Newey which were to dominate Formula One for the next 7 years.

In the early 1990s, teams started introducing electronic driver aids, whose use spread rapidly. Active suspension, (pioneered by Lotus in 1987), semi-automatic gearboxes (Ferrari in 1989), and traction control (Ferrari in 1990) All enabled cars to reach higher and higher speeds provided the teams were willing to spend the money. The FIA, due to complaints that technology was determining the outcome of races more than driver skill, banned many such aids in 1994. However, many observers felt that the ban on driver aids was a ban in name only as the FIA did not have the technology or the methods to eliminate these features from the competition. Even this controversy did not diminish the pleasure British fans of the sport felt in 1992, when Nigel Mansell finally won the title, after a decade of trying, nor French fans in 1993 when Alain Prost took his 4th Championship, both drivers piloting Williams-Renault cars.

Lightweight television cameras attached to the cars became common in the early 1990s (following an American network TV practise actually pioneered in Australia). As well as boosting audience figures this also made the sport more attractive to sponsors beyond the traditional cigarette companies. Safety improvements also meant that the major car manufacturers were more inclined to attach themselves to teams on a rolling basis. 1994 then seemed ripe to produce a stunning season. Ayrton Senna had moved to Williams to replace Prost, who retired from the sport. Young German driver Michael Schumacher had Ford power for his Benetton. McLaren had high hopes for its new Peugeot engine (which had been developed through the French marque's Le Mans sportscar racing program) which ultimately did not happen and Ferrari were looking to put the tumultuous seasons of 1991–93 behind them with Gerhard Berger and Jean Alesi. The season was stunning but for all the wrong reasons.

Following the decline of Lotus after Senna´s departure at the end of the 1987 season four teams dominated during several seasons. McLaren, Williams, Renault (formerly Benetton), and Ferrari, dubbed the "Big Four", placed themselves as the top four teams in the Constructors' Championship in every season between 1989 and 1997, and won every race but one (the 1996 Monaco Grand Prix) between 1988 and 1997. Additionally, drivers from these four teams won every World Championship from 1984 to 2008 as well as the teams won every Constructors' Championship from 1979 to 2008. Due to the technological advances of the 1990s, the cost of competing in Formula One increased dramatically, thus increasing financial burdens. This, combined with the dominance of four teams, caused the poorer independent teams to struggle not only to remain competitive but to stay in business. This effectively forced several teams to withdraw.

=== Safety, rules, and regulations (1994) ===
See 1994 season.

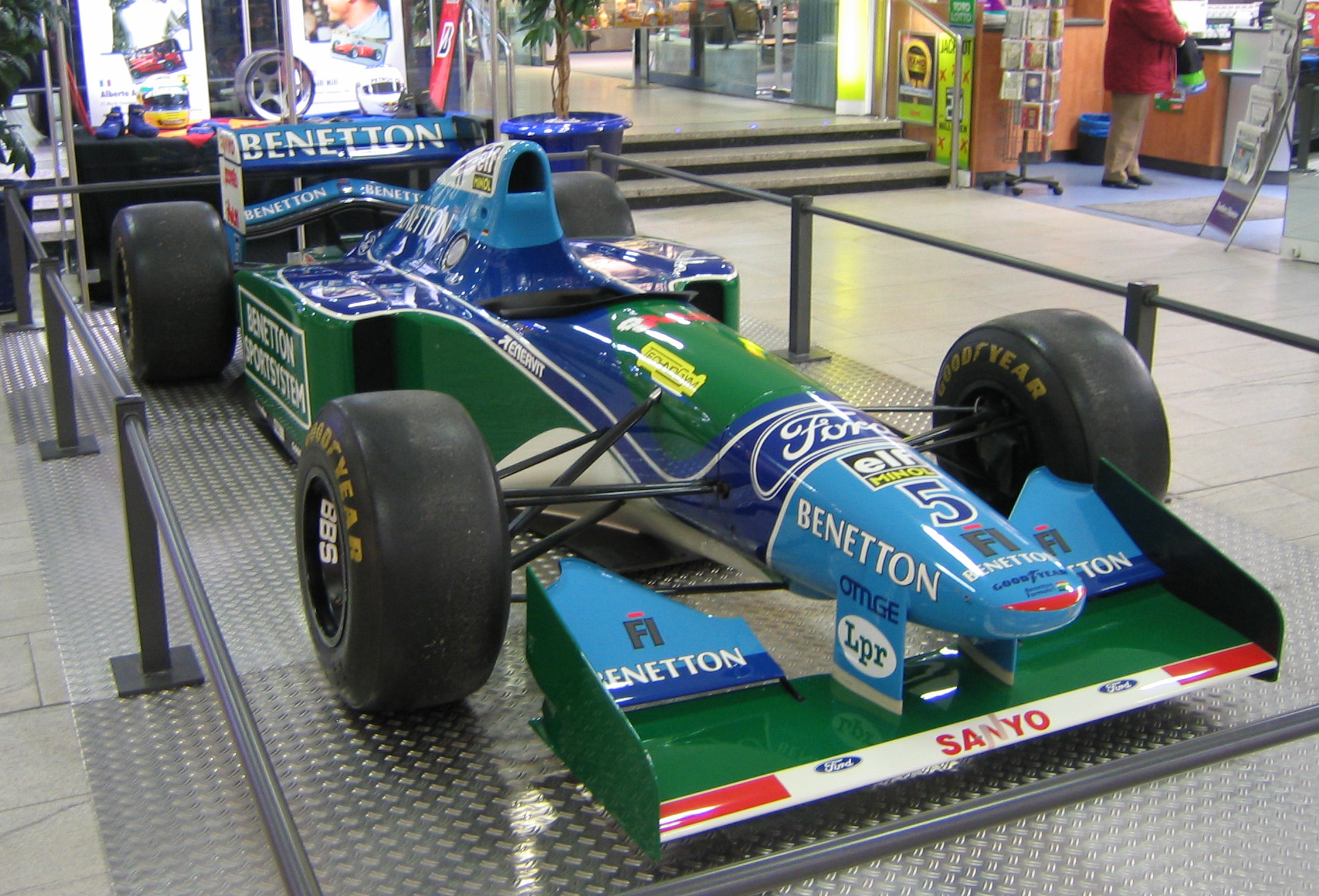
The Benetton B194 Michael Schumacher drove to the 1994 title

By 1994, the previous death in Formula One was nearly a decade past, that of Elio de Angelis during testing at the Circuit Paul Ricard in 1986. There had been several horrifying accidents (for example Nelson Piquet and Gerhard Berger at Imola, or Martin Donnelly at Jerez), but no fatalities. The speed of Formula One cars had continuously risen over 8 years, despite turbocharged engines being made illegal, the width of tyres being reduced and driver aids eventually being removed. There was an "air of invincibility" in Formula One, a belief that the cars were inherently safe and no more drivers would die.

At the San Marino Grand Prix weekend this belief was crushed completely with the serious injuries sustained by Rubens Barrichello in practice and the deaths of Roland Ratzenberger during qualifying and Ayrton Senna in the race on 1 May 1994. Furthermore, Karl Wendlinger was left comatose after a crash two weeks later at the Monaco Grand Prix. The shock from the sudden injuries and deaths was stunning. Not only had two drivers been killed, but one of them was a triple world champion and arguably the best F1 driver at the time. The FIA reacted swiftly and harshly with major changes to be enforced from that year onwards, and it was the beginning of the FIA's push to increase safety in Formula One.

While significant changes could not be made to cars in 1994, the FIA required all Formula One cars' airboxes to be perforated to reduce their "ram-air" effect, to reduce power. For the same reason special racing fuels, previously an exotic mixture of benzenes and toluenes, were banned and only those with similar characteristics to everyday unleaded petrol would be permitted. To reduce downforce, and therefore the cornering speed of the cars, a wooden "plank" was to be fitted beneath the central portion of the chassis, forcing a large section of the floor further away from the track. If the plank was worn over a certain tolerance (approximately 10 mm), the car would be deemed illegal. This wooden plank remains under F1 cars today.

Further, from 1995 designs were required to be drawn from a reference plane (template), and strict limitations were enforced as to the minimum and maximum tolerances for aspects of the vehicle such as the size of the cockpit opening (an idea well known in Champ Car for a decade) and of aerodynamic devices, commonly called wings. Further, maximum engine displacement was reduced from 3.5 to 3 litres. Further changes were mandated as the FIA continued to try to curb the increase in speeds of Formula One cars as the years progressed. These changes included the increase in the size of the cockpit opening (to ensure driver egress was easy and to minimise possible side head impacts), introducing grooved tyres (to reduce cornering speeds by reducing grip) and narrower bodywork (this would complicate cooling and also reduce cornering speed), raising and reducing wing sizes and elements (cutting aerodynamic downforce, thus reducing cornering speed), and introducing comprehensive checks on stiffness tolerances and measurements to ensure cars conformed completely with the regulations (for example, weight tests on wings and bodywork to ensure that they maintained integrity and did not flex to give an aerodynamic advantage in a straight line).

The rapid introduction of all of these new rules and regulations, particularly those introduced in 1994, made the atmosphere even more chaotic for Formula One. Michael Schumacher had to fight desperately for his first World Drivers' Championship, as his Benetton team found itself in frequent violations of FIA regulations and Schumacher was suspended for two races as a result. Even his championship-clinching race in Australia was controversial, as he collided with rival Damon Hill (son of Graham) and ensured himself of the title.

=== 3-litre engines (1995–1999) ===
See 1995 season, 1996 season, 1997 season, 1998 season and 1999 season.

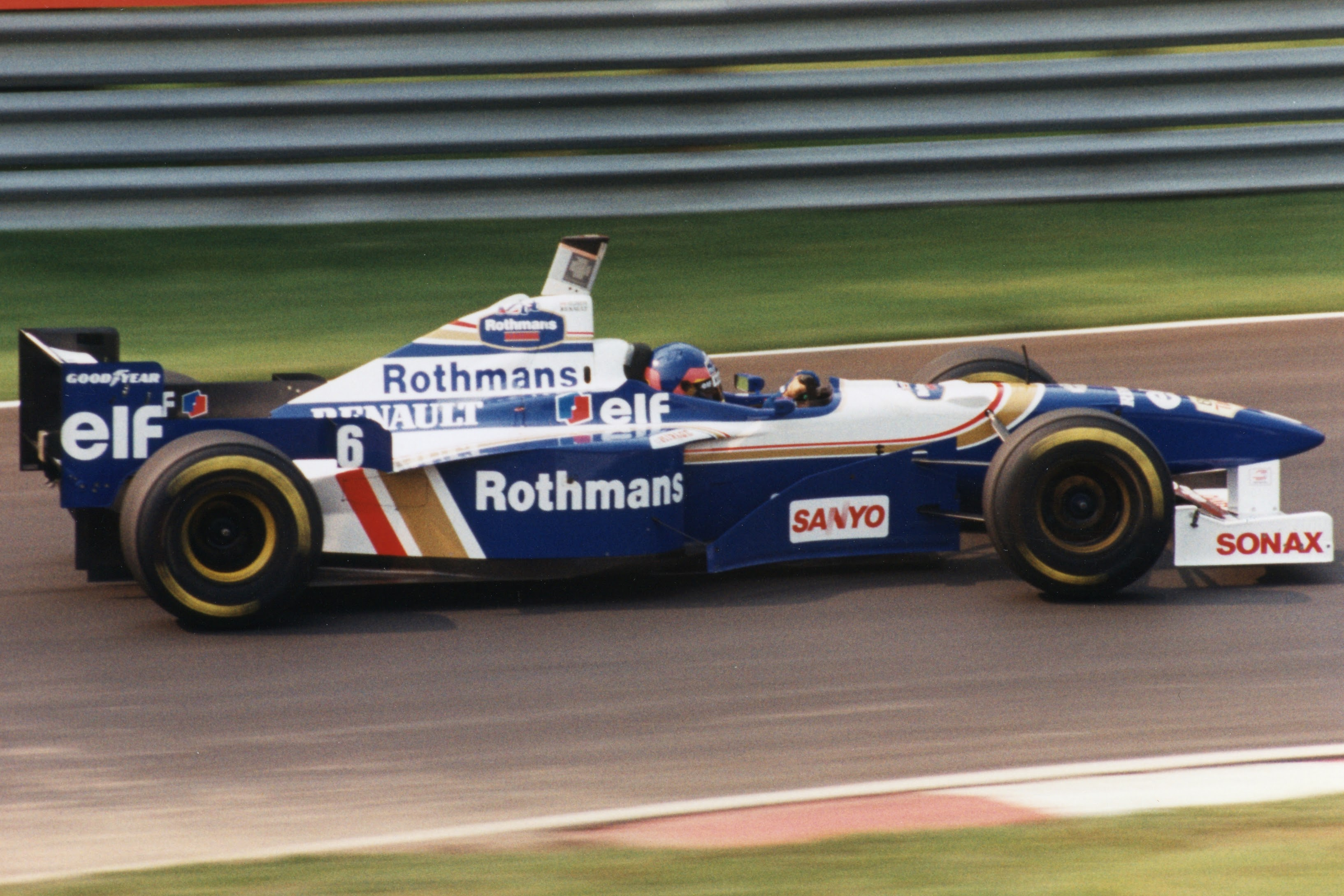
Jacques Villeneuve driving for the Williams team at the 1996 Canadian Grand Prix. He is the most recent of four drivers, alongside Nigel Mansell, Alain Prost and Damon Hill, to win World Drivers' Championship titles for Williams in the 1990s.

By 1995, things had settled down somewhat. The downgraded 3-litre formula had no effect of the domination of the Renault V10, and Schumacher took his second Drivers' title, and Benetton their first Constructors' title, with relative ease, defeating the Williams team of Hill and David Coulthard. The Renault engine which powered both teams was virtually unbeatable, with only Ferrari claiming a single win at the Canadian Grand Prix for Alesi, his only career win.

For 1996, the FIA mandated a much larger minimum size cockpit area, along with driver's head protection, to ensure the driver's head was less exposed (ironically, this limited driver visibility and contributed to accidents). As part of his plan to rebuild Ferrari, Jean Todt brought Michael Schumacher to the team from Benetton that year, essentially in exchange for his 1995 drivers Alesi and Berger. There was an immediate effect, in his first year with the Scuderia Schumacher won three races, more than the team had managed in the previous five years. Ferrari were not championship contenders though and Damon Hill made a strong run to the title, finally claiming the crown after 3 years of almost but not quite.

In 1997, another son of an F1 racing legend took the titles for Williams once again, as Jacques Villeneuve became the 4th driver to take both the Formula One and CART championship (the others being Mario Andretti, Emerson Fittipaldi, and Nigel Mansell). Villeneuve also became the only Canadian to have won a Formula 1 Drivers' title. The 1997 season was much closer than 1996, and Villeneuve only clinched the Drivers' Championship at the final race. Once again, Michael Schumacher collided with his championship rival at the final race, but unlike 1994 events turned against him. Schumacher not only found himself knocked out of the race, but was found to have deliberately tried to run Villeneuve off of the road. Schumacher was stripped of second place in the Championship and was disgraced.

At the end of 1997 Renault withdrew from Formula One. McLaren-Mercedes took the Drivers' Crown for the next two years, both being claimed by Mika Häkkinen. The Finn was nearly untouchable as he took his first title while Schumacher and Villeneuve could only watch. 1999 provided a stiffer contest for the title. Villeneuve was out of the picture at the brand-new BAR but Schumacher was in contention when he crashed and broke his leg at Silverstone. His teammate Eddie Irvine eventually lost by only two points to Mika Häkkinen, but his efforts contributed to Ferrari's first Constructors' Championship since 1983.

Behind the title races, however, there were signs of trouble brewing in Formula One. The long-established, highly respected Lotus name vanished from the starting grids, following Brabham's demise in mid-1992. French manufacturer Ligier found themselves in desperate straits, and were sold to Alain Prost. Ken Tyrrell's team floundered on, despite dismal results, until 1998, when BAR bought the team. And the colourful era of the small, private teams finally came to an end. Names like Larrousse, Dallara, Simtek, Pacific, MasterCard Lola, Life Racing Engines, March Engineering, Onyx Grand Prix, Coloni, Andrea Moda, Fondmetal, Osella, Footwork, AGS, Lambo, Leyton House Racing, EuroBrun and Forti would no longer be seen on the starting grids, with only Jordan, Sauber, Arrows and Minardi managing to survive somehow. The flourishing of Jordan in 1998 and 1999, under the leadership of Damon Hill, Heinz-Harald Frentzen and Ralf Schumacher (Michael's younger brother) proved to be a last hurrah of the privateer, not a sign of health in the sport. Even once-mighty Benetton champions only a few years before were barely surviving. Jackie Stewart fronted his own team from 1997 to 1999 with backing from Ford but even then sold out as the team transformed into Jaguar.

=== V10 engines and rise of road car manufacturer participation (2000–2005) ===
See 2000 season, 2001 season, 2002 season, 2003 season, 2004 season and 2005 season.

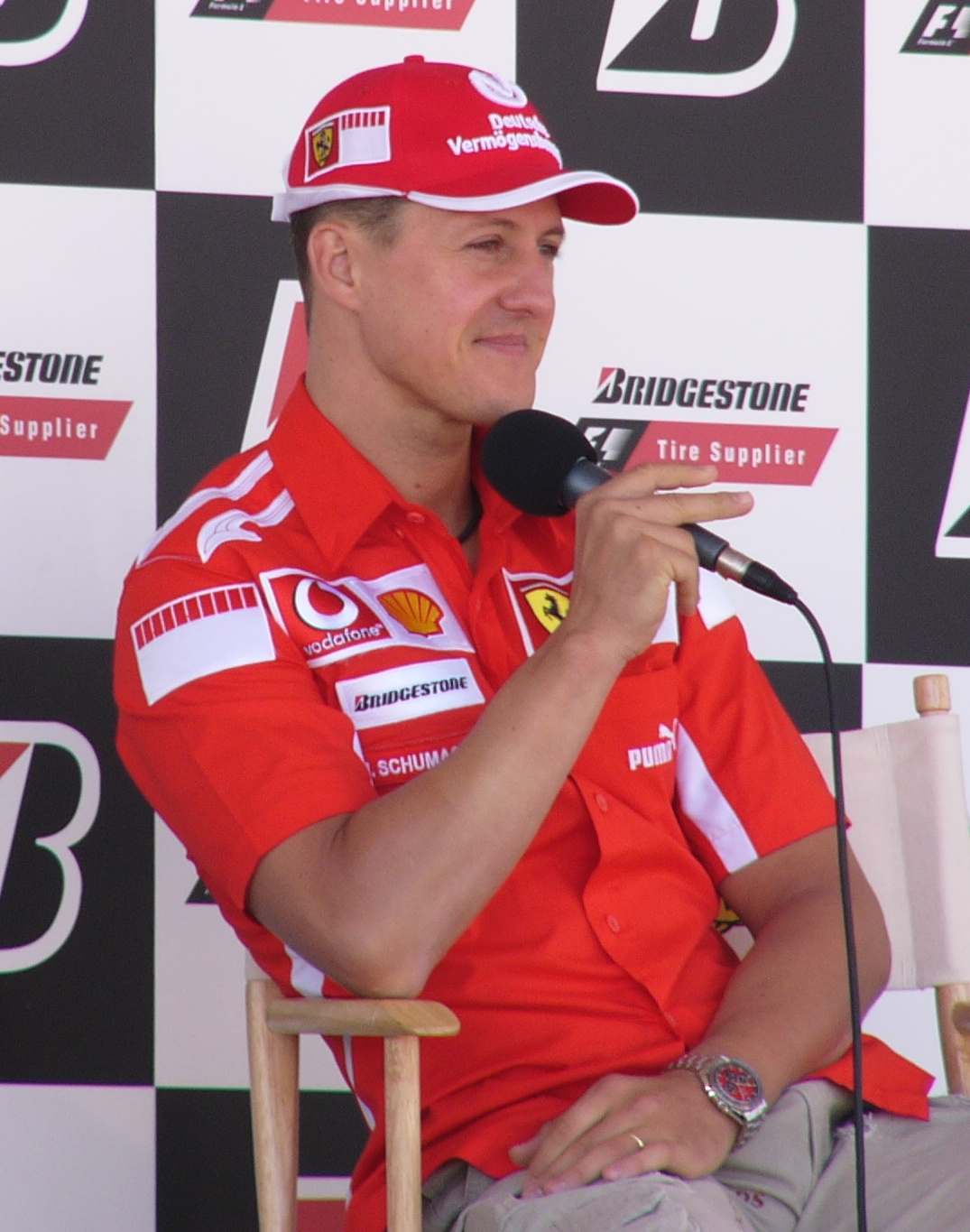
Michael Schumacher holds the record of most consecutive World Drivers' Championship titles which he achieved from 2000 to 2004 driving for Ferrari.

After the banning of turbocharged engines in 1989, V10 became the most popular engine configuration in Formula One, because it offered the best compromise between power and fuel consumption. From the 1998 season onwards, all competing teams had V10 engines in their cars. V12s were powerful but thirsty, while V8s were more fuel-efficient but lacked power. 2000 saw the grids of Formula One start to revert to normal, as Jordan rapidly faded out of sight, and Williams, looking forward to a new partnership with BMW started to reassert itself. The fight at the front, however, was very much between Häkkinen and Schumacher, each two-time champion, driving cars closely matched in performance. Ferrari had been steadily improving since their low point in the early 1990s and in 2000 Schumacher prevailed, becoming the first three-time Champion since Senna, and bringing the World Drivers' title to Ferrari for the first time since Jody Scheckter in 1979. The 2001 season saw Ferrari start to leave the rest of the grid behind, and Schumacher won the championship by the Hungarian Grand Prix, which tied him as second quickest championship winner with Nigel Mansell. 2001 also saw the reintroduction of electronic driver aids after a seven-year absence, starting at the Spanish Grand Prix, which included fully-automatic gearboxes, launch control, and traction control, marking the first time since the 1993 season that these systems were allowed to be used. For 2002, the season was a red-wash. Ferrari finished every race and won 15 of 17. Michael Schumacher scored more points than the second and third-placed drivers combined, after gaining a podium in all of the races (Schumacher had only a single third place, in Malaysia). In this season, he wrapped up the championship at the French Grand Prix (Round 11 of 17), becoming the earliest ever championship winner.

While Ferrari celebrated their dominance, the sport itself was seen by many to be in trouble. Two more privateers, Prost and Arrows, had closed their doors for good, while Benetton was bought out by Renault. Even more troubling was the one team in seemingly no danger of disappearing: Ferrari. While Formula One was no stranger to teams monopolizing the winner's stand, Ferrari's actions throughout the 2002 season annoyed many; in particular, the staged finishes of the Austrian Grand Prix and the US Grand Prix. It seemed to many that it was possible to take the dictum of 'win at all costs' too far. Ratings and attendance noticeably declined in the latter half of 2002, a serious problem for a sport which was by far the most expensive (and, more importantly, most lucrative) in the world by this time.

A number of major car manufacturers had joined Formula One since 2000 – there were as many as eight manufacturers participating in Formula One at most. BMW and Honda had returned as works engine manufacturers in 2000, while Ford had rebranded the Stewart team as Jaguar and developed engines through its Cosworth subsidiary. In 2001, Renault also returned as a works engine maker and bought the Enstone-based Benetton team, which it rebranded as Renault in 2002. Toyota joined the series in 2002, developing both chassis and engine at its facility in Cologne. Mercedes continued its participation as engine manufacturer in association with Ilmor, and part-owned McLaren.

In 2003, despite heavy rule changes (such as a new points system) in order to prevent another year of Ferrari dominance, Schumacher won the championship once more. He was run close by both Kimi Räikkönen and Juan Pablo Montoya, but Schumacher prevailed, taking the championship by two points at Suzuka. It seemed that 2003 was the perfect balm to ease the memories of the previous season, with 8 different race winners (including first-time victories for Fernando Alonso, Kimi Räikkönen and Giancarlo Fisichella) and 5 different teams, including both Renault (for the first time in twenty years) and Jordan, who grabbed a lucky win in a wild Brazilian Grand Prix.

In 2004, Ferrari and Schumacher returned to almost total dominance of the championships, winning both with ease – in the first thirteen races of the season, Schumacher managed to win twelve. A new race in Bahrain made its debut in April and another new race in China debuted in September. It was initially thought that in introducing these new races, older Grands Prix in Europe, like the British Grand Prix, might be removed from the championship, but instead, the number of races was increased to eighteen. According to Ecclestone, the move was to increase Formula One's global reach, though the steady tightening of restrictions on tobacco advertising in Europe and elsewhere may also have been a factor. This move saw the percentage of races held outside Formula One's traditional European home climb to around fifty percent – meaning the World Championship, which visits four of the six continents, truly deserves its name. 2004 was Michael Schumacher's most recent of his record seven World Championships. Schumacher also held the record for the most races won – with ninety-one, and now remains the driver with the second most wins ever. The 2004 season also saw a big change in technical regulations, including the banning of two electronic driver aid systems; namely fully-automatic gearboxes and launch control, both of which had been used for the last three seasons, marking the first time since 1994 that cars competed without using these systems. This was done to ensure that costs were kept down for a competitive F1 team, as well as keeping the skill of driving a Formula 1 car relevant to the driver. However, the use of traction control was still permitted by the FIA, and was used for the next three seasons, until an effort to ban the system led to the FIA finally outlawing it for the 2008 season.

Despite Ferrari's dominance (taking 15 wins from the 18 races), the battle back in the pack was much more open than 2002, as powerhouses McLaren and Williams got off to horrendous starts with radical new cars. As could have been expected, Renault was quick to capitalize on the misfortunes of the two older British teams, but the real shock came from British American Racing, led by Jenson Button. Although failing to win a race, Button was a regular sight on the 2nd or 3rd step of the podium, and with teammate Takuma Sato who had finished 3rd at the US Grand Prix behind the Ferraris managed to clinch 2nd in the Constructors' Championship, leaving Renault 3rd, Jarno Trulli's win in Monaco some consolation. Montoya and Räikkönen each managed a solitary win for their teams, which finished 4th and 5th in the results. The Ford Motor Company's decision to pull out of Formula One at the end of 2004 exposed the vulnerabilities of some small teams. Not only was their works Jaguar team sold to Austrian drinks company Red Bull, but the few remaining small independent teams, who traditionally had used Ford engines, found their engine supply in a precarious state.

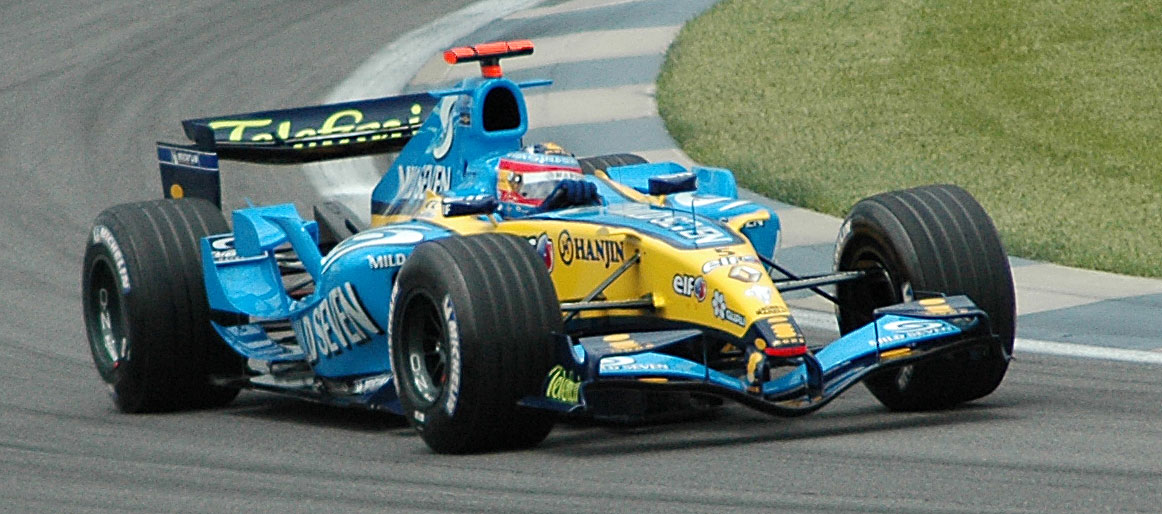
Fernando Alonso in qualifying for Renault at the 2005 United States Grand Prix during their maiden World Championship winning season that ended Ferrari's dominant reign.

In 2005, Formula One saw Ferrari and BAR rapidly fade out of sight, as the works Renault team dominated the early part of the season, and Fernando Alonso forged a clear championship lead. In the latter part of the season, McLaren was significantly the stronger team, with consistently better results and a win tally of 6 from 7 races. However, their early record of poor reliability had meant that catching Renault in either Drivers' or Constructors' Championships was a tall order.

For a while, it looked close between Räikkönen and Alonso, but by Brazil Alonso had become Formula One's youngest ever champion. The Constructors' Championship looked even more likely for McLaren, widely regarded as the faster car and with reliability much improved. However, a retirement for Juan Pablo Montoya in the season finale at Shanghai secured the Constructors' title for Renault. One statistic proved the two teams' dominance: they together won all but one of the races, the controversial U.S. Grand Prix, in which neither of the two teams participated, which was Schumacher and Ferrari's only win of the year.

Arguably, the final small specialist racing team disappeared with the September 2005 purchase of Minardi by Red Bull to be renamed as Scuderia Toro Rosso and run as a separate entity alongside Red Bull Racing. Jordan had been bought by Russo-Canadian steel company Midland early in 2005 and was renamed Midland F1 for the 2006 season. In June 2005, BMW bought a majority stake in Sauber, which became their factory entry. The Williams team ceased their partnership with BMW as a result, entering a commercial arrangement with Cosworth instead. From 2006 manufacturer teams had an unprecedented level of involvement in the sport. Honda also bought BAR.

2005 marked the end of the V10-era in Formula One. To keep costs down, the configuration had been made mandatory in 2000 (although only V10s had been in use since 1998, Toyota were planning on entering Formula One with a V12 and had to delay their entry by a year to redesign) so that engine builders would not develop and experiment with other configurations. Over this period, the statistics show the supremacy of the Renault and Ferrari engines, with Renault clinching six Constructors and five Drivers' Championships as engine suppliers for Williams and Benetton from 1992 to 1997, and their first-ever Drivers' and Constructors' Championships in a 100% Renault car in 2005. Ferrari also enjoyed great success in the V10 era, winning six Constructors' Championships and five Drivers' Championships from 1999 to 2004.

=== 2.4-litre V8 engines (2006–2008) ===
See 2006 season, 2007 season and 2008 season.

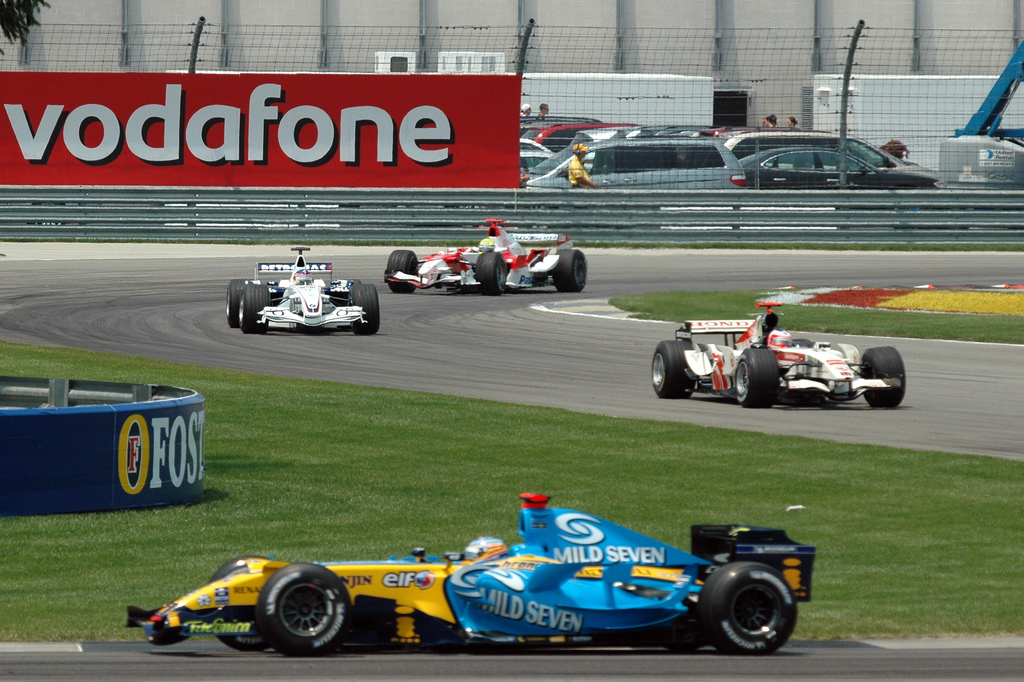
Fernando Alonso (Renault) leads Rubens Barrichello (Honda), Jacques Villeneuve (BMW) and Ralf Schumacher (Toyota) at the 2006 United States Grand Prix

2006 was the last season with two tyre manufacturers: Japanese manufacturer Bridgestone and French company Michelin. In December 2005, the FIA announced that from the 2008 season, there would be only one tyre-supplier. Five days later, Michelin announced it would quit Formula One at the end of the 2006 season, leaving Bridgestone as the sole supplier from 2007. Renault and Fernando Alonso established early leads in both the Constructors' and Drivers' Championships. By mid-season, Ferrari appeared to be making a comeback. The Italian Grand Prix saw Schumacher reduce Alonso's lead to only two points as Alonso suffered an engine failure. The race also saw Ferrari pull ahead of Renault for the first time in 2006. The race results were largely overshadowed by Schumacher announcing, during the post-race press conference, that he would retire at the end of the season. An engine failure for Schumacher at the Japanese Grand Prix, along with costly puncture in the final round in Brazil allowed Alonso to secure the Drivers' Championship for the second year running, with Renault also securing the Constructors' Championship.

The 2007 Formula One season saw a much more competitive McLaren, with current world champion Alonso alongside rookie Lewis Hamilton. However, Hamilton surprised everyone with a run of nine consecutive podiums in his first nine races seeing him take a significant lead in the Drivers' Championship. Alonso's relationship with McLaren deteriorated as the season progressed, as he believed it was his right as world champion to be favoured above his teammate. A mistake by Hamilton in China and a mechanical problem in Brazil ruined his championship. Alonso, however, was not able to fully capitalise on the situation, and Ferrari's Kimi Räikkönen took the championship after a strong second half to the season. Räikkönen turned around a 17-point deficit with two races to go to win by a single point.

Both McLarens finished the Championship on 109 points. Fernando Alonso was placed third, behind Lewis Hamilton through countback. Renault had a much less successful season in 2007 than in previous years and struggled to match the pace of McLaren and Ferrari. Ferrari also clinched the Constructors' Championship after McLaren's disqualification over the controversy over the suspicion that McLaren had Ferrari information. 2007 marked the seventh and final season, since its reintroduction in 2001, that the use of traction control was permitted in F1. Standardised ECUs were mandated by the FIA from the 2008 season onwards, which prevented teams from using this kind of technology. The 2008 season also marked the first time since the 2001 San Marino Grand Prix that all cars competed without using traction control. For the 2008 and 2009 seasons Fernando Alonso returned to Renault, but having little success he joined Ferrari in 2010.

2008 again saw McLaren and Ferrari have the most competitive cars. However, the season was much more open, with winners from three other teams. After agonising defeat in 2007, Hamilton clinched the Drivers' Championship in dramatic fashion, overtaking Timo Glock in the Toyota to secure the fifth place he needed in the last corner of the last lap of the final Grand Prix. Felipe Massa had won the race, and would also have won the Drivers' Championship if it had not been for Hamilton's crucial overtake. Despite this, Ferrari secured the Constructors' Championship for the eighth time in ten years.

=== Cost-cutting measures and departure of car manufacturers (2009–2013) ===
See 2009 season, 2010 season, 2011 season, 2012 season and 2013 season.

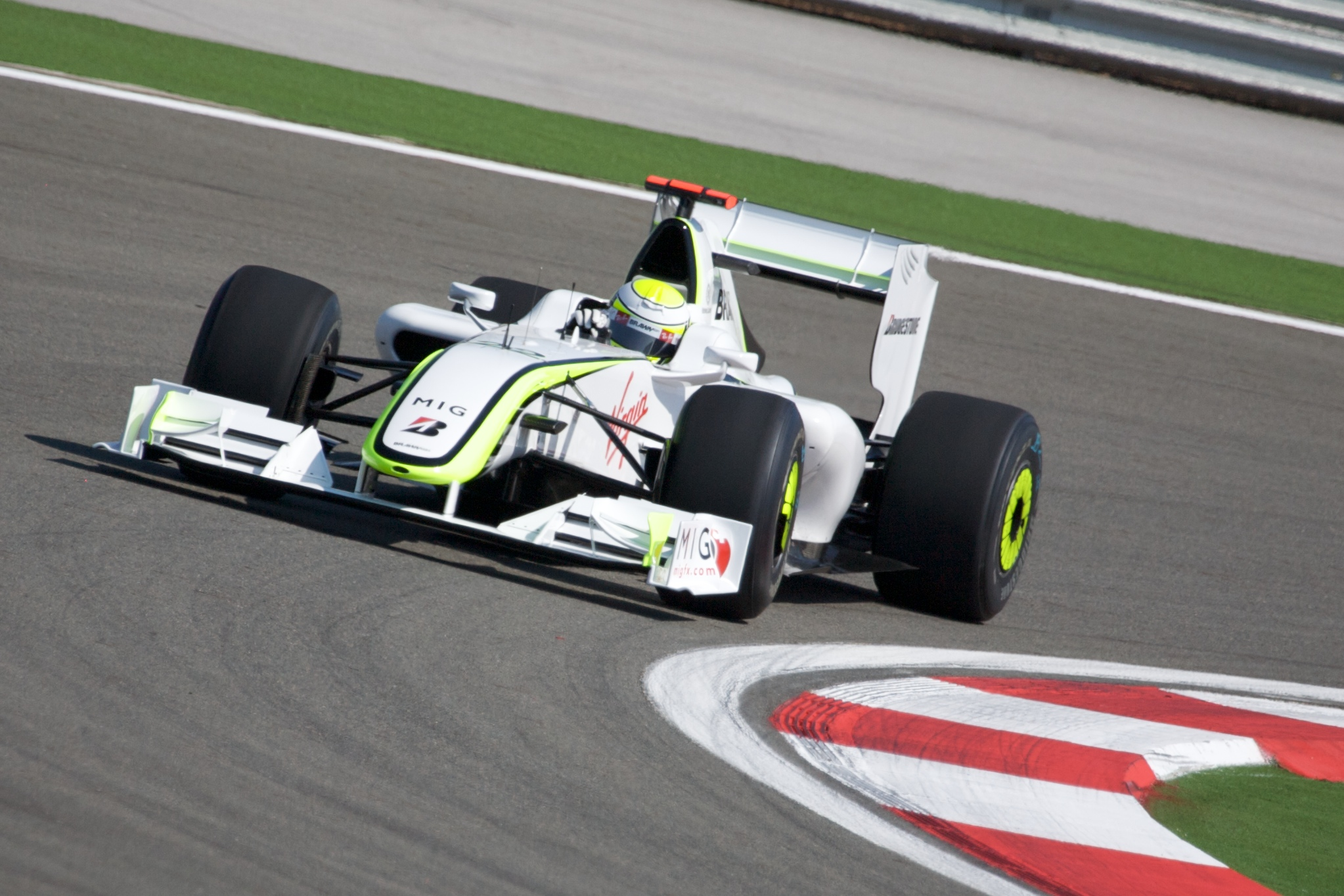
Brawn GP won both the Drivers' and Constructors' Championships in their debut (and only) season in the penultimate round in 2009 Brazilian Grand Prix

During the 2000s, Formula One cars had become extremely complex, efficient, and reliable, so much so that actual racing between drivers began to become less and less common. 2009 saw the introduction of many new rules and regulations (including engine RPM limits, an adjustable front wing, and disproportionate wing sizes) to encourage overtaking. Engine RPM reached 20,000 rpm (and over for Renault and Cosworth) in 2006, and was initially limited to 19,000 rpm for 2007; this was lowered to 18,000 from 2009 to 2013.

The most significant system introduced in F1 was the Kinetic Energy Recovery System (KERS), a system that stores energy, created by braking, through a flywheel; this energy is then channeled to the car's drivetrain to increase acceleration. A few well-funded teams had tested this technology the previous year but it remained too experimental; all of the teams' KERS systems needed more development, so none of them would be ready for 2009. Due to the global economic recession, many more rule changes were brought in to reduce the cost of participating in Formula One. Initially a standardised engine was proposed, but this idea was rejected by the teams, who came up with their own cost-cutting measures. These included a huge reduction in testing times and an increase in the required engine and gearbox mileage. Many teams voiced concerns over the cost of KERS and have suggested a standardised unit, but so far no such opportunity exists. The new rules and regulations saw a new order in 2009, with new teams Brawn GP and Red Bull Racing and their drivers leading the way, with Ferrari and McLaren having a poor season. However, Ferrari started by the British Grand Prix to make the most of their car with a string of podium finishes and a race victory in Belgium, while a redesign of the McLaren challenger helped Lewis Hamilton to win two races and gain more points than any other driver after it was upgraded at the German Grand Prix.

After dominating the beginning of the season with six out of seven race wins, Jenson Button eventually clinched the Drivers' Championship in Brazil, with Brawn GP winning the Constructors' Championship in its only season, before being taken over by Mercedes. Rubens Barrichello, Jenson Button's teammate, was second in the Drivers' Championship for the whole season until he had a problem at the Brazilian Grand Prix and was overtaken (in points) by Sebastian Vettel, a Red Bull driver, who won the Abu Dhabi Grand Prix to finish eleven points behind Button. Also, the major manufacturer teams were starting to disappear rapidly due to the worldwide economy crisis. In addition to Ford/Jaguar which had left in 2004, Honda had departed in 2008 also due to uncompetitiveness, Toyota and BMW both departed entirely in 2009 (BMW sold Sauber, a team it had bought in 2005 after its split with Williams even though in 2010 the team was still called BMW Sauber), Renault changed their involvement as a full works effort to engine supplier in 2011 and Cosworth departed entirely as an engine supplier in 2013.

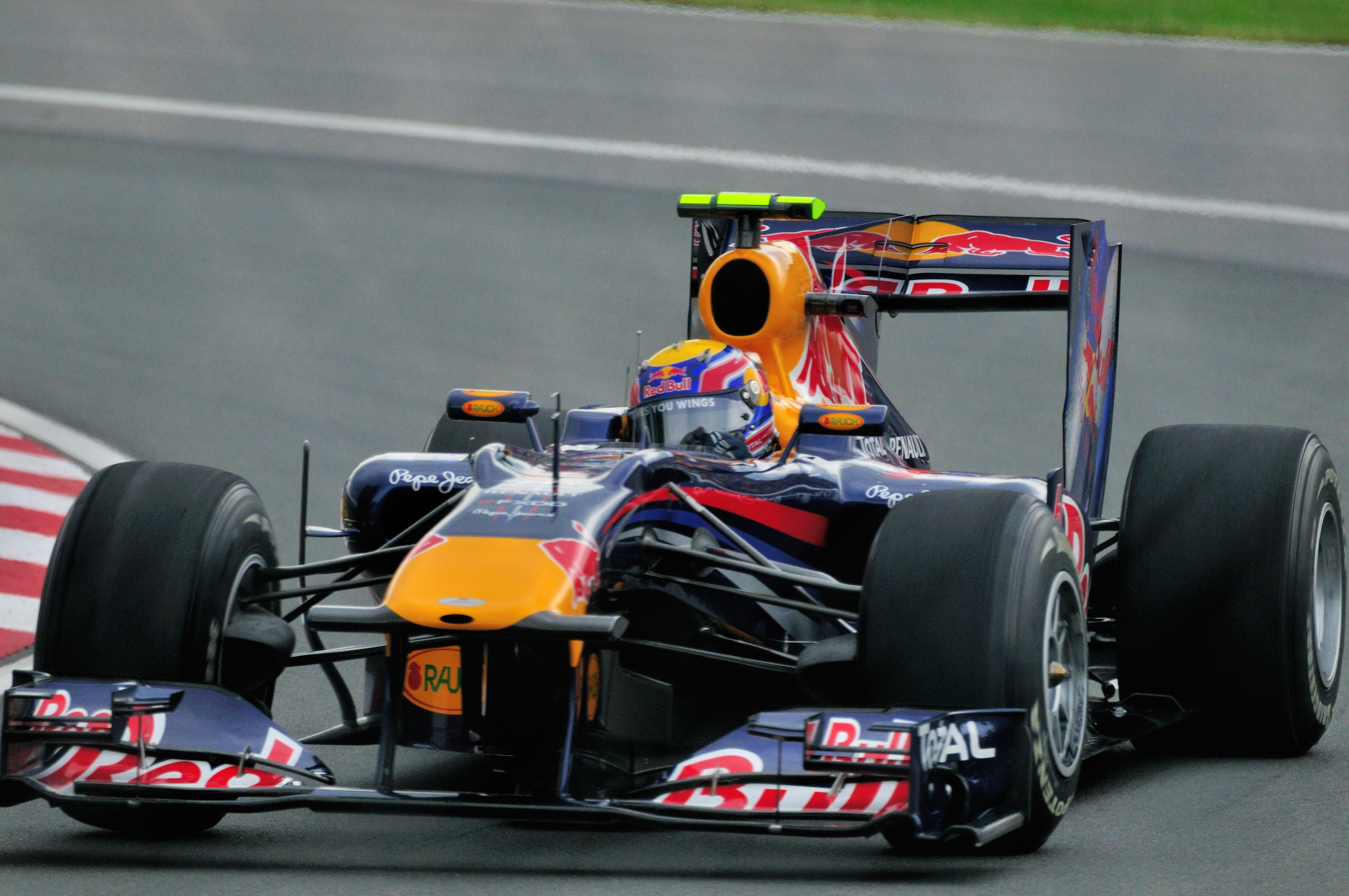
Red Bull Racing prospered under the new rules with a runners-up in the 2009 Drivers' and Constructors' Championships and both titles in 2010, 2011, 2012 and 2013

2010 saw more changes in the way of rules and regulations. KERS and double diffusers were banned for the 2010 season, but new innovative features on the cars such as F-ducts were introduced. An allocated eight engines, per driver, for the whole season was also introduced as part of more cost-cutting methods. The biggest change in the points scoring system in F1 history happened between 2009 & 2010. The 10–8–6–5–4–3–2–1 point system for the top eight finishers (which had been running since 2003), was replaced with the drastically different 25–18–15–12–10–8–6–4–2–1 for the top-10 finishers.

Red Bull Racing returned to have a great season in 2010, thanks to their hiring of designer Adrian Newey in 2007. They won the Constructors' Championship in the penultimate round in Brazil, and Red Bull driver Sebastian Vettel won the championship in the final round of the 2010 season at Abu Dhabi. Mercedes GP (formerly Brawn GP) had a much less successful and winless season than 2009 with their two new drivers – seven-time World Champion Michael Schumacher had returned to Formula One, but was regularly beaten by fellow German, Nico Rosberg.

McLaren and Ferrari had better seasons in 2010, finishing respectively second and third among the constructors. The Drivers' Championship was very closely fought, with six drivers leading the championship at various points, in the joint longest ever (nineteen-race) season. For most of the season, the title looked like it could have gone to either Red Bull's Sebastian Vettel or Mark Webber, or either McLaren's Lewis Hamilton or reigning World Champion Jenson Button (also at McLaren). But, the Ferrari of Fernando Alonso clawed back 47 points after the British Grand Prix, to be leading the Drivers' Championship with two races left. A record four drivers were still in contention for the title going into the final round in Abu Dhabi. They were Alonso, Webber, Vettel and Hamilton (placing in that order in number of points before the race). They did not finish that way though, with Vettel winning the race and the title when the others finished too far down the field. Vettel became the youngest ever World Champion in the history of the sport.

After a controversial race in Hockenheim, 2010 led to the ban on team orders being dropped. When Ferrari asked Felipe Massa to move over to allow their No.1 driver Fernando Alonso into the lead of the race and take the win, they were fined $100,000. The FIA decided that the rule was too vague, and there was nothing they could do to enforce it. This led to an end to the ban on team orders for the 2011 Formula One season. Other changes included a re-introduction KERS, the introduction of the Drag reduction system (DRS) (a driver activated moveable flap on the cars rear wing), and a change in tyre supplier from Bridgestone to Pirelli. Vettel and Red Bull lead their respective championship from the start until the end of the season, dominating and taking their second successive titles. Vettel also became the youngest double world champion when he clinched the title at the 2011 Japanese Grand Prix, Red Bull took the Constructors' Championship at the following race in South Korea.

McLaren and Ferrari finished second and third in the standings once again, albeit much further behind. Button eventually took second place in the standings, with Webber in third once again. Vettel took 11 victories throughout the course of the year, broke the record for the most pole positions in a season (15) and the most championship points (392). After a slow start to the 2012 season, Vettel won 4 races in a row and challenged Fernando Alonso and Ferrari all the way through. Eventually, the German Vettel took the lead from the Spanish Alonso and Vettel opened up a 13-point gap come the last round in Brazil. Vettel won his third consecutive Drivers' title after finishing 6th at Interlagos, while Alonso finished 2nd. 2013 also went Vettel's way: the superiority of the Red Bull in race trim allowed the German to open up a small lead early in the season, and starting with the Belgian Grand Prix (after F1's 4-week summer break), the superiority of the Red Bull car began to show. The British-based Austrian team had developed an engine-mapping system that gave their car a type of traction control (actual traction control systems are illegal), and Vettel used this to his considerable advantage. He won in Belgium and after that, the rest of the remaining races in the season (9 races total). The German and the Red Bull team simply ran away with the Drivers' and Constructors' Championships, both of which they won in India – Vettel won his 4th consecutive Drivers' Championship there. Come the Korean round, 2 rounds before the Indian one, Red Bull had developed a special aerodynamic diffuser that gave the cars a considerable cornering advantage. Vettel and his Australian teammate Mark Webber were leading 1–2 for most of those 9 races, and the cars often qualified in the top 3 grid spots; and when they qualified 1–2, it was often by considerable amounts of time.

=== Introduction of 1.6-litre turbocharged V6 hybrid power units and cost cap (2014–2021) ===
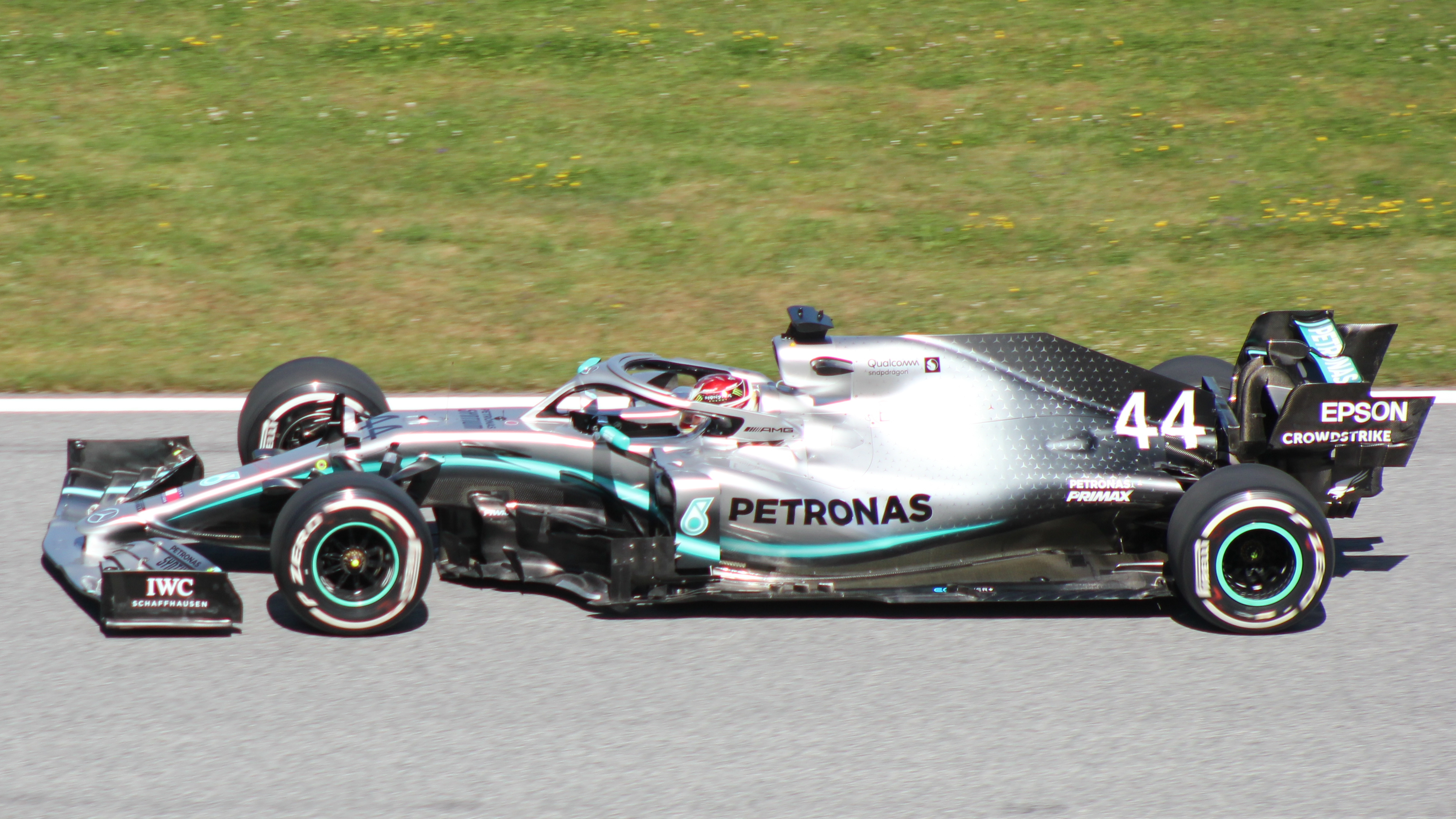
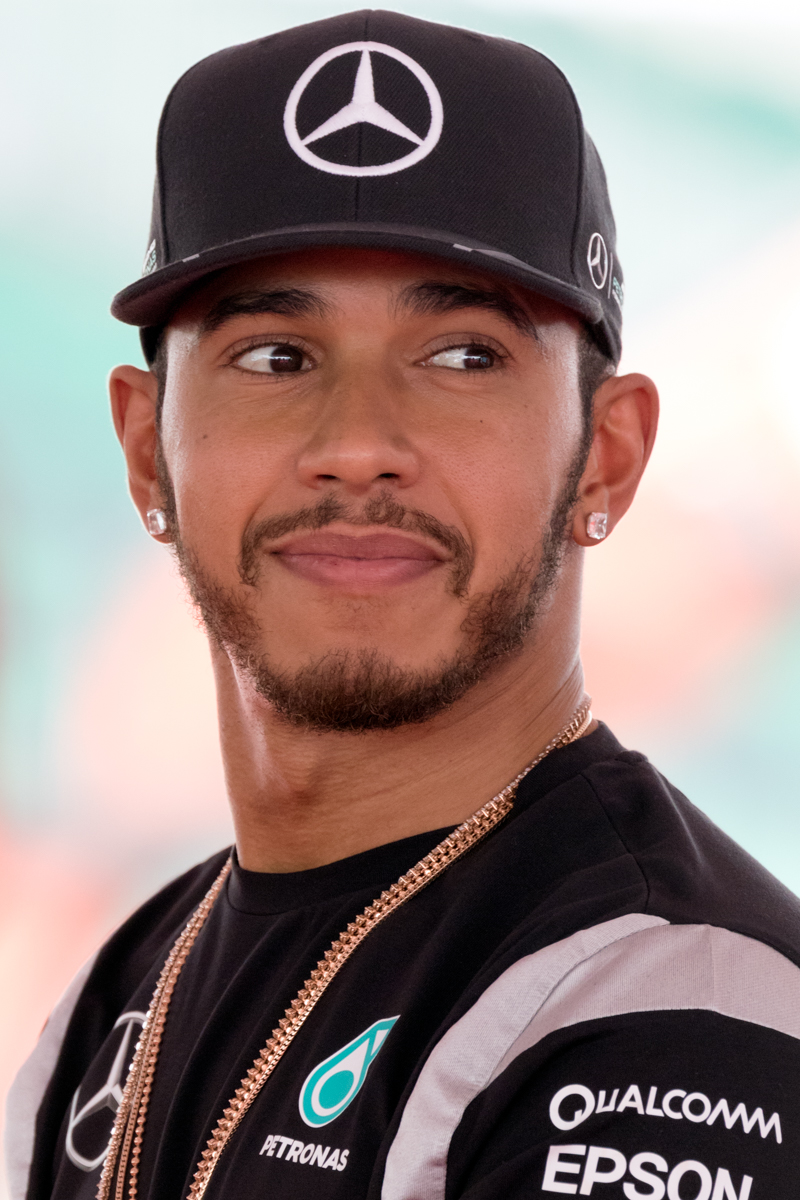
Mercedes won a record-making eight Constructors' Championships in a row from 2014 to 2021. Lewis Hamilton won 81 races and six World Drivers' Championship titles during this time driving for the team.

See 2014 season, 2015 season, 2016 season, 2017 season, 2018 season, 2019 season, 2020 season, 2021 season and Formula One engines.

Formula One entered its second turbocharged era in 2014. Australia was the location of the end of the first era (Adelaide 1988) and start of the second (Melbourne 2014). The series is being run under the most radical engine regulation changes since 1995. All cars entering any Formula One championship race must run with 1.6-litre single turbocharged 6-cylinder engines with a rev limit of 15,000 rpm and maximum fuel flow of 100 kg/hr. New car regulations will also be enforced, and the minimum weight regulations will be raised from 642 kg (1,415 lb) to 690 kg (1,521 lb). Ferrari, Mercedes and Renault produced engines from 2014 with Honda producing engines from 2015; Cosworth did not participate from 2014 and beyond. In-season engine development returned; the previous V8's development was frozen. The new turbo engines produce 600 bhp (the previous V8s produce approximately 750 hp); but the new energy recovery system (ERS) would be twice as powerful as the previous KERS system; this new ERS system would give the drivers up to the equivalent of 160 hp when activated, whereas the previous KERS gave cars an extra 80 hp when activated. Since 2017 new rules about aerodynamics and the consistent improvement of the engines, that now reach around 1000 hp, have made the cars finally faster than the 2004 ones, breaking numerous track records.

The Mercedes team and their drivers Lewis Hamilton and Nico Rosberg dominated the start of the hybrid era, winning 51 of the 59 races (31 for Hamilton and 20 for Rosberg) between 2014 and 2016 as well as all titles during that period (Hamilton was champion in 2014 and 2015 while Rosberg won in 2016). This success was the result of Mercedes' development of the "split turbocharger", a system in which the compressor and turbine components of the turbo charger are placed at separate sides of the engine and connected by a rod running through the V of the engine. This new technology gave Mercedes and their customer teams many advantages over their competitors due to the need for less cooling and a more compact power unit.

Ferrari and their driver Sebastian Vettel emerged as strong title contenders in 2017 and 2018 after rule changes in aerodynamic design were implemented for 2017, but despite mid-season championship leads for Vettel in both seasons, Hamilton and Mercedes ultimately won the titles with multiple races to spare. Mercedes subsequently won both championships comfortably in 2019 and 2020 along with an additional constructors' title in 2021, with Hamilton managing to equal Michael Schumacher's record of seven World Championships. In 2021, Mercedes faced stiff competition from the Honda-powered Red Bull team, whose driver Max Verstappen won the Drivers' Championship after a season-long battle with Hamilton to end the run of Mercedes only winning titles in the hybrid era.

=== Ground effect cars and aerodynamic changes for closer racing (2022–2025) ===
See 2022 season, 2023 season, 2024 season, 2025 season

In 2022, the FIA designed a new set of rules designed to promote "closer racing." This mostly included aerodynamic changes. Citing a loss of downforce in a trailing car caused by dirty air, the FIA introduced a new type of car designed around using ground effect to create downforce. This was the first time ground effect was used since venturi tunnels under cars were banned in 1983. In the previous cars, air led off the car in a chaotic pattern, creating "dirty air" that decreased the downforce of the car right behind it. The new 2022 car uses ground effect to create downforce, meaning there is less drag and dirty air behind the car. This promotes closer racing as it allows attacking cars to get up closer to the leading car, increasing the number of risky overtakes per race. This is done by simplifying the exterior of the car and instead using the floor to generate downforce, instead of sending air outwards or under the car into the diffuser. A newer front wing is designed to prevent outwash. Ground effect features in the car also allow the car to follow leading cars better by decreasing the effect of dirty air on its downforce. Bargeboards were eliminated and a newer front wing with simpler endplates to decrease the complexity of aerodynamic components. The front wings were also required to directly attach to the nosecone, which has an increased height. The wider rear wings are mounted higher, and regulations limit the teams' ability to use exhaust gases to increase downforce. The number of aerodynamic upgrades a team can make to the car was decreased, to cut the costs of competing. Although the cars used the same 1.6-litre turbocharged V6 hybrid engines from the previous era, the engines also included new sensors and standard components. This increases the FIA's ability to monitor the power units. However, there were changes made to the type of fuel in the engines. In 2022, the percentage of bio-components in fuel increased from 5.75% in previous years to 10%, moving to E10 (ethanol) fuels. This is designed to make Formula 1 more sustainable, as well as align better with road car fuel regulations.

After a slow season beginning dominated by Scuderia Ferrari, Red Bull Racing dominated the season. Their drivers Max Verstappen and Sergio Pérez dominated most races. The season ended with Verstappen winning the World Drivers' Championship and Red Bull winning the Constructors' Championship. Verstappen ended the season with 454 points, the highest number of points in one season ever recorded. He was 146 points ahead of Charles Leclerc in second place and his teammate Pérez in third.

In 2023, Verstappen cruised to his third consecutive Drivers' Championship title clinching it at the Qatar Grand Prix, winning a record 19 out of 22 Grands Prix held and finishing on the podium 21 times (also a record number for most podiums in a season) by the end of the championship. His team, Red Bull Racing achieved their sixth Constructors' Championship title, the second consecutively, at the preceding Japanese Grand Prix. Red Bull Racing won 21 out of 22 Grands Prix, breaking the team record for highest percentage of Grand Prix wins in a season at 95.45%, beating McLaren's 1988 season, the only 2023 Grand Prix to elude them being the 2023 Singapore Grand Prix won by Carlos Sainz in a Ferrari. Verstappen also broke the record for the highest Grand Prix win percentage for drivers, with a win rate percentage of 86.36%, beating the previous record set by Alberto Ascari in 1952.

The 2024 season started in similarly dominant fashion for Verstappen and Red Bull with the Dutchman winning 7 of the first 10 rounds of the season. However, as the season progressed other team notably McLaren and Ferrari began to overhaul Red Bull in terms of performance . Whilst Verstappen would win nine Grand Prix in 2024 and prove consistent enough win a fourth consecutive drivers title clinching it at the Las Vegas Grand Prix. McLaren's improved performance level in 2024 would see them become constructors champions for the ninth time overall and for the first time since 1998 at the Abu Dhabi Grand Prix with Ferrari as runners-up and Red Bull third. McLaren driver Lando Norris would finish as runner-up to Verstappen in the 2024 drivers standings.

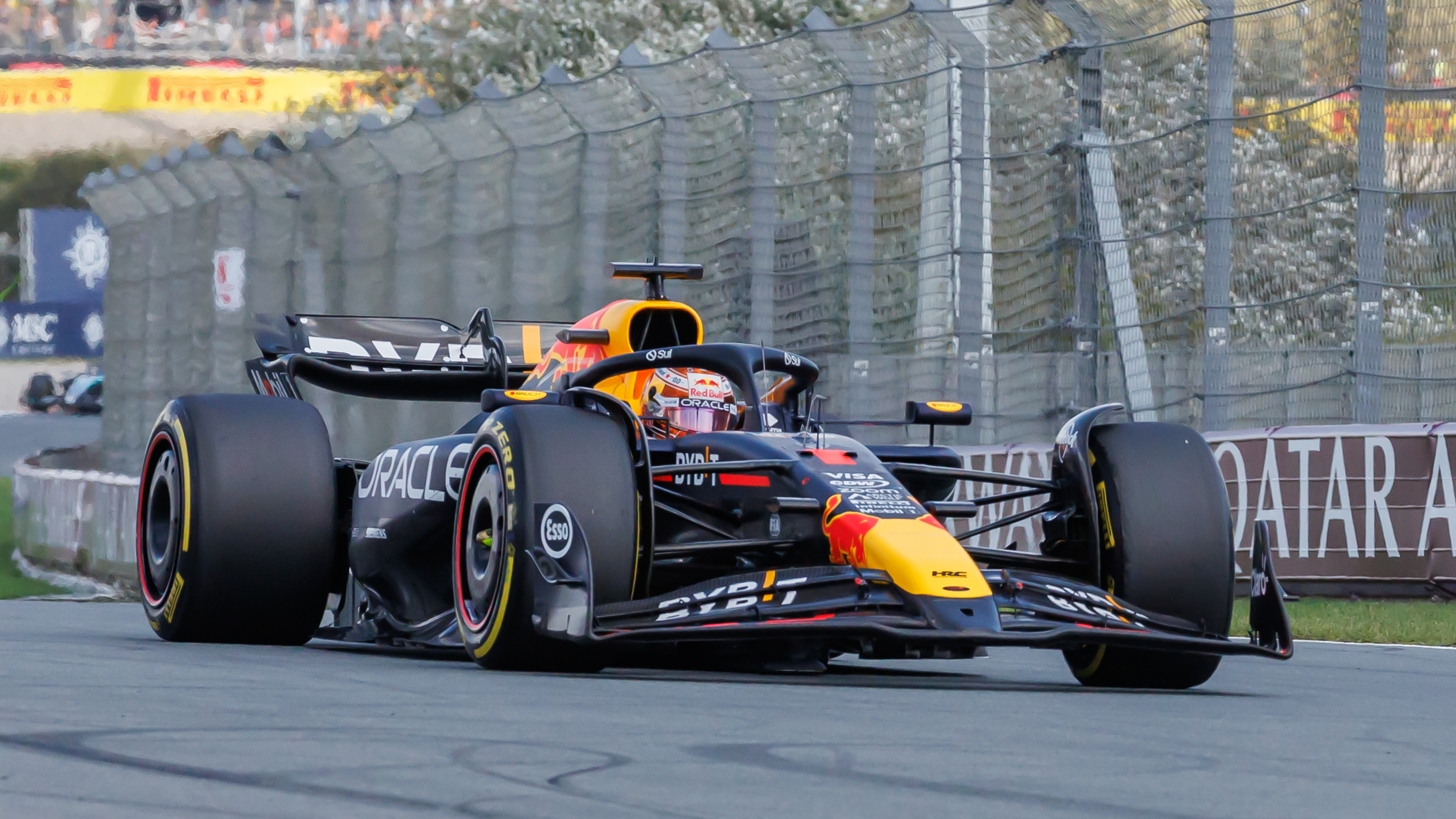
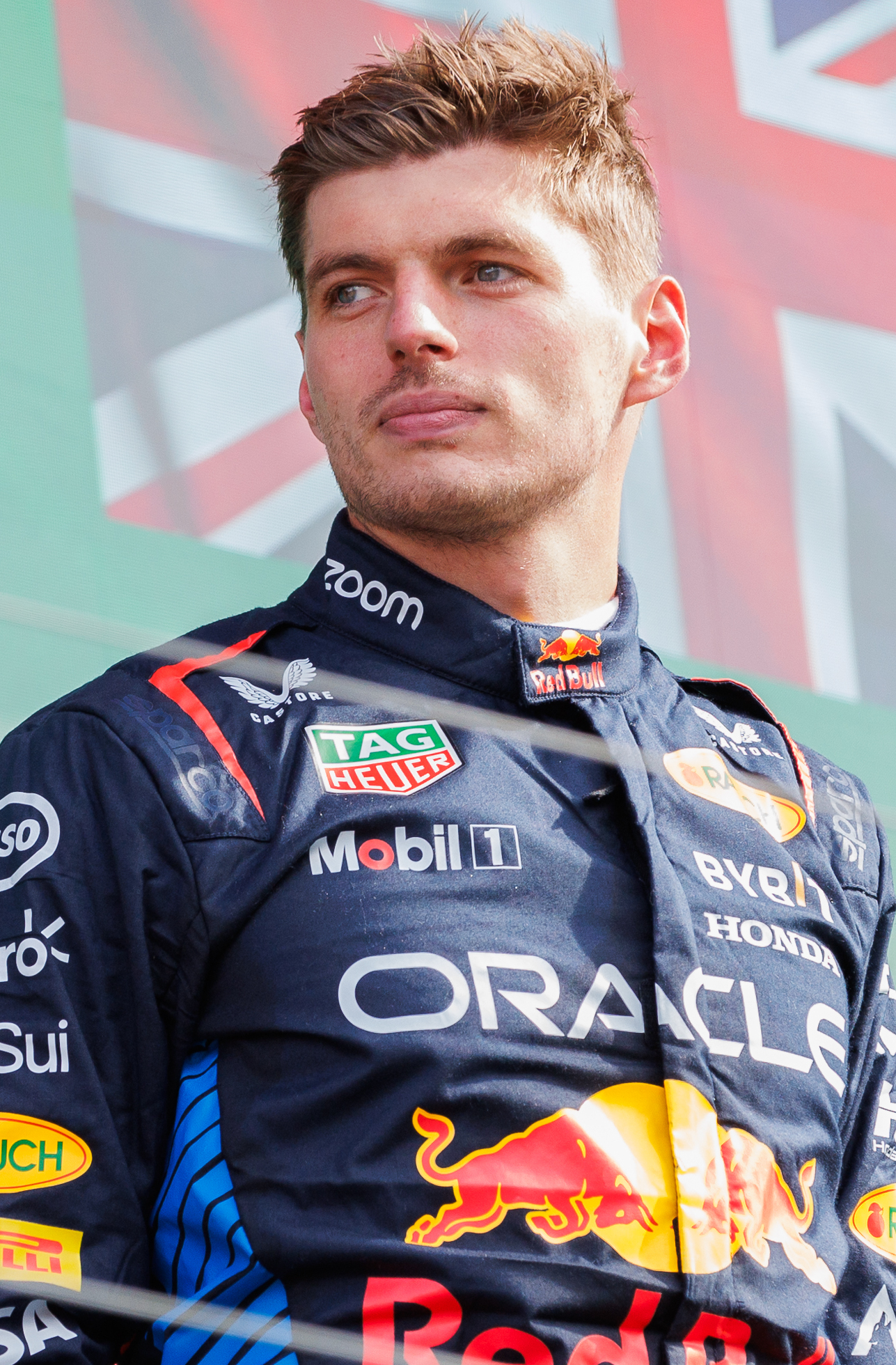
Red Bull Racing had the most success during the ground effect era by winning 55 of 92 races, 51 of which were won by Max Verstappen.

The 2025 season marked the last season of the ground effect cars that were introduced in 2022 and the last year of the Drag Reduction System (DRS) overtaking aid that was first introduced in 2011 as well as the last year for the Motor Generator Unit Heat (MGU-H) which had been part of the V6 hybrid power units since they were introduce in 2014. The season also saw the end of Max Verstappens' title winning streak as Lando Norris overcame early season form wobbles to hold off a late season surge from the Dutch defending champion to win his first drivers title at the season finale in Abu Dhabi from Verstappen by just two points with Norris' McLaren teammate Oscar Piastri finishing third in the drivers standings a further eleven points behind Verstappen putting him thirteen points behind new World Champion Norris. The championship win for Norris marked McLarens' first drivers title success since Lewis Hamilton in 2008. Piastri had led the drivers championship by thirty-four points from Norris and by one-hundred four points from Verstappen after the fifteenth round of the season at the Dutch Grand Prix (which he won) but a significant slump in form and results in the latter part of the season saw him overhauled in the points table by both Verstappen and Norris by the end of the season. McLaren had easily sealed their second consecutive constructors title earlier that season with six rounds to spare at the Singapore Grand Prix.

== Relative importance of car quality to driver skill (1950–2020) ==
In 2020, the British magazine The Economist ranked champion drivers by the relative importance of car quality to driver skill, based on a study by Andrew Bell of the University of Sheffield, UK. This ranking considers the relative statistical significance of the car maker's contributions:

1. Juan Manuel Fangio (2.9)
2. Jim Clark (2.6)
3. Alain Prost (2.1)
4. Jackie Stewart (1.95)
5. Michael Schumacher (1.9)
6. Lewis Hamilton (1.8)
7. Alberto Ascari (1.75)
8. Ayrton Senna (1.7)

The ranking illustrates that over time car quality has become more important. For example, Schumacher won 5 of his 7 titles (1994–2004) with a single car maker (Ferrari). Hamilton won all of his 7 titles (2008–2020) with a Mercedes-Benz engine (one of them in conjunction with McLaren). In the 1950s, Fangio won his 5 titles (1951–1957) with four different teams: Alfa Romeo, Mercedes-Benz, Ferrari, and Maserati.
