= Gunston =

Gunston is a surname. Notable people with the surname include:

- Bill Gunston (1927–2013), aviation and military author
- Edward Gunston (1913–1991), Australian cricketer
- Jack Gunston (born 1991), Australian rules footballer
- Gunston baronets
  - Sir Derrick Gunston, 1st Baronet (1891–1985), British politician
  - Sir John Gunston, 3rd Baronet (born 1962), English photographer

== Fictional characters ==
- Norman Gunston, a satirical TV character performed by Australian actor and comedian Garry McDonald

== See also ==
- Gunston (cigarette), a South African cigarette brand
