= John Gunston =

Sir John Welleseley Gunston, 3rd Baronet (born July 1962) is the third Baronet of Wickwar in the County of Gloucestershire in the Baronetage of the United Kingdom. He is perhaps better known for his exploits as a photographer in Afghanistan in the 1980s.

Born in Nyasaland (later Malawi), he was the son of the local British commissioner in the town of Blantyre. Having lived in Cape Town, Johannesburg and London, Gunston enrolled at Harrow when he was 13. Leaving after three years, Gunston returned to Africa to join the Police Anti-Terrorism Unit of the British South African Police in Rhodesia. He served for 18 months on the Mozambique-Zambian border seeing active service against both ZIPRA & ZANLA fighters attacking farms in the Sipolilo-Umvukwes area, before returning to England to enrol at the Royal Military Academy in Sandhurst, Surrey. From there he commissioned into the Irish Guards. After leaving the Guards, and having recovered from a serious car accident, in 1983, at the age of 21, Gunston decided to become a war photojournalist.

Gunston made several trips into war-torn Afghanistan through the 1980s, covering the war between the occupying Soviet forces aligned to the Communist Afghan government, and mujahidin resistance groups. Overall making more than 25 trips with the mujahidin spending in excess of two years inside Afghanistan. Gunston was one of the relatively few western journalists who went inside Afghanistan during this period. He traveled at different times with the mujahidin groups controlled by Gulbuddin Hekmatyar, Ahmad Shah Massoud – he had the [mis] fortune of being captured in an ambush [1984] by Massoud's forces during which time he was wounded & taken prisoner, as result he was the only journalist to be with Massoud during the Soviet Panjshir VII operation [May–June 1984]. However it was with Haji Abdul Haq with whom Gunston formed a close friendship and it was with Haq's mujahidin in and around Kabul that he spent most of his time. Including a clandestine mission into Kabul [1988] to meet Afghan Army Generals who wanted to work with Haq following the Soviet withdrawal.

Little has been written about Gunston's life before the Afghan war. Some relatively brief accounts of his exploits during the war can be found in Robert D. Kaplan's 1990 book, 'Soldiers of God – With the Mujahidin in Afghanistan.' Kaplan was a friend of Gunston, and also a journalist in Afghanistan during the 1980s. Also Rob Schultheis's 1992 book, 'Night Letters – Inside Wartime Afghanistan.' More recently, David Loyn's 2006 'Frontline: The True Story of the British Mavericks Who Changed the Face of War Reporting.' John Simpson also mentions meeting Gunston in Afghanistan in two of his memoirs.

In the 1990s Gunston set up a documentary production company with Juliet Peck, the widow of his good friend Rory Peck with whom he traveled inside Afghanistan during the 1980s. In 1995 Gunston was also co-founder with Juliet Peck of the Rory Peck Award & Trust.

Following the 9/11 attacks, Gunston was asked to join Abdul Haq in Rome who was then meeting with the late Afghan King Mohammed Zahir Shah. As a result, Gunston led a small advisory team to Peshawar Afghanistan to assist Abdul Haq, as he put together a force of former mujahidin to cross back into Afghanistan and fight the Taliban. Gunston was also liaising on Haq's behalf with both British & US governments, as Taliban military leaders were keen to work with Abdul Haq in overthrowing the Taliban political leadership and their Al-Qaeda allies. At the time of Haq's death Gunston was in Rome lobbying the king on Haq's behalf.

Following Abdul Haq's death Gunston was asked to join Haji Abdul Qadir at the Bonn peace conference where he was appointed a personal adviser to Qadir and the interim Eastern Shura. In late November Haji Qadir asked Gunston if he could assist his son, Haji Zahir Qadir, who was leading Qadir's former mujahidin in a sector at the battle of Tora Bora. Gunston took a small team of advisers to Jalalabad to help Haji Zahir. His advisory appointment continued up until Vice President Qadir's assassination in July 2002.

Since then, Gunston has continued to work closely with various Afghan leaders, NGOs, and companies involved in Afghanistan.

== Sources ==
- Leigh Rayment's list of baronets
- Kaplan, D. Robert (1990). Soldiers of God – With the Mujahidin in Afghanistan. Houghton Mifflin. ISBN 0-395-52132-7.
- Schulheis, Robert (1992). 'Night Letters – Inside Wartime Afghanistan. Orion Books, New York. ISBN 0-517-58861-7.
- Loyn, David (2006). Frontline: The True Story of the British Mavericks Who Changed the Face of War Reporting. Michael Joseph Ltd. ISBN 978-0-14-101784-6.
- Rory Peck Trust Official website

Baronetage of the United Kingdom
Preceded by Richard Gunston	Baronet (of Wickwar); 1991–present	Incumbent
