= Gunston baronets =

Baronetcy in the Baronetage of the United Kingdom

The Gunston Baronetcy, of Wickwar in the County of Gloucester, is a title in the Baronetage of the United Kingdom. It was created on 1 February 1938 for Derrick Gunston, Conservative member of parliament for Thornbury from 1924 to 1945.

== Gunston baronets, of Wickwar (1938) ==
- Sir Derrick Wellesley Gunston, 1st Baronet (1891–1985)
- Sir Richard Wellesley Gunston, 2nd Baronet (1924–1991)
- Sir John Wellesley Gunston, 3rd Baronet (born 1962)

The heir apparent is the present holder's son Richard St. George Gunston (born 1992).
