= Tyrrell Grand Prix results =

The table below details World Championship Grand Prix results for the Tyrrell Formula One team. The second table includes results from privately owned Tyrrell cars in World Championship Grands Prix.

== Tyrrell Racing ==
(key)

Year	Chassis	Engine(s)	Tyres	Drivers	1	2	3	4	5	6	7	8	9	10	11	12	13	14	15	16	17	Points	WCC
1966	Matra MS5	Ford Cosworth SCA 1.0 L4	D		MON	BEL	FRA	GBR	NED	GER	ITA	USA	MEX									—N/a (Note: Formula 2 entry.)	
1966	Matra MS5	Ford Cosworth SCA 1.0 L4	D	(Belgium) Jacky Ickx						Ret												—N/a	
1966	Matra MS5	BRM P80 1.0 L4	D	(Germany) Hubert Hahne						9												—N/a	
1967	Matra MS5	Ford Cosworth FVA 1.6 L4	D		RSA	MON	NED	BEL	FRA	GBR	GER	CAN	ITA	USA	MEX							—N/a	
1967	Matra MS5	Ford Cosworth FVA 1.6 L4	D	(Belgium) Jacky Ickx							Ret											—N/a	
1968	Matra MS9	Ford Cosworth DFV 3.0 V8	D		RSA	ESP	MON	BEL	NED	FRA	GBR	GER	ITA	CAN	USA	MEX						—N/a (Note: Not entered as a Constructor.)	
1968	Matra MS9	Ford Cosworth DFV 3.0 V8	D	(United Kingdom) Jackie Stewart	Ret																	—N/a	
1968	Matra MS10	Ford Cosworth DFV 3.0 V8	D	(United Kingdom) Jackie Stewart				4	1	3	6	1^{F}	Ret	6	1^{F}	7						—N/a	
1968	Matra MS10	Ford Cosworth DFV 3.0 V8	D	(France) Jean-Pierre Beltoise		5^{F}																—N/a	
1968	Matra MS10	Ford Cosworth DFV 3.0 V8	D	(France) Johnny Servoz-Gavin			Ret						2	Ret		Ret						—N/a	
1969	Matra MS10; Matra MS80; Matra MS84	Ford Cosworth DFV 3.0 V8	D		RSA	ESP	MON	NED	FRA	GBR	GER	ITA	CAN	USA	MEX							—N/a	
1969	Matra MS10; Matra MS80; Matra MS84	Ford Cosworth DFV 3.0 V8	D	(United Kingdom) Jackie Stewart	1^{F}	1	Ret^{P}^{F}	1^{F}	1^{P}^{F}	1^{F}	2	1	Ret	Ret	4							—N/a	
1969	Matra MS10; Matra MS80; Matra MS84	Ford Cosworth DFV 3.0 V8	D	(France) Jean-Pierre Beltoise	6	3	Ret	8	2	9	12	3^{F}	4	Ret	5							—N/a	
1969	Matra MS10; Matra MS80; Matra MS84	Ford Cosworth DFV 3.0 V8	D	(France) Johnny Servoz-Gavin									6	NC	8							—N/a	
1969	Matra MS7	Ford Cosworth FVA 1.6 L4	D	(France) Johnny Servoz-Gavin							Ret											—N/a	
1970	March 701	Ford Cosworth DFV 3.0 V8	D		RSA	ESP	MON	BEL	NED	FRA	GBR	GER	AUT	ITA	CAN	USA	MEX					—N/a	
1970	March 701	Ford Cosworth DFV 3.0 V8	D	(France) Johnny Servoz-Gavin	Ret	5	DNQ															—N/a	
1970	March 701	Ford Cosworth DFV 3.0 V8	D	(France) François Cevert					Ret	11	7	7	Ret	6	9	Ret	Ret					—N/a	
1970	March 701	Ford Cosworth DFV 3.0 V8	D	(United Kingdom) Jackie Stewart	3^{P}	1	Ret^{P}	Ret^{P}	2	9	Ret	Ret	Ret	2								—N/a	
1970	001	Ford Cosworth DFV 3.0 V8	D	(United Kingdom) Jackie Stewart											Ret^{P}	Ret	Ret					0	NC
1971	001; 002; 003	Ford Cosworth DFV 3.0 V8	G		RSA	ESP	MON	NED	FRA	GBR	GER	AUT	ITA	CAN	USA							73	1st
1971	001; 002; 003	Ford Cosworth DFV 3.0 V8	G	(United Kingdom) Jackie Stewart	2^{P}	1	1^{P}^{F}	11	1^{P}^{F}	1^{F}	1^{P}	Ret	Ret	1^{P}	5^{P}							73	1st
1971	001; 002; 003	Ford Cosworth DFV 3.0 V8	G	(France) François Cevert	Ret	7	Ret	Ret	2	10	2^{F}	Ret	3	6	1							73	1st
1971	001; 002; 003	Ford Cosworth DFV 3.0 V8	G	(United States) Peter Revson											Ret							73	1st
1972	002; 003; 004; 005; 006	Ford Cosworth DFV 3.0 V8	G		ARG	RSA	ESP	MON	BEL	FRA	GBR	GER	AUT	ITA	CAN	USA						51	2nd
1972	002; 003; 004; 005; 006	Ford Cosworth DFV 3.0 V8	G	(United Kingdom) Jackie Stewart	1^{F}	Ret^{P}	Ret	4		1	2^{F}	11	7	Ret	1^{F}	1^{P}^{F}						51	2nd
1972	002; 003; 004; 005; 006	Ford Cosworth DFV 3.0 V8	G	(France) François Cevert	Ret	9	Ret	NC	2	4	Ret	10	9	Ret	Ret	2						51	2nd
1972	002; 003; 004; 005; 006	Ford Cosworth DFV 3.0 V8	G	(France) Patrick Depailler						NC						7						51	2nd
1973	005; 006	Ford Cosworth DFV 3.0 V8	G		ARG	BRA	RSA	ESP	BEL	MON	SWE	FRA	GBR	NED	GER	AUT	ITA	CAN	USA			82	2nd
1973	005; 006	Ford Cosworth DFV 3.0 V8	G	(United Kingdom) Jackie Stewart	3	2	1	Ret	1	1^{P}	5	4^{P}	10	1	1^{P}	2	4^{F}	5	WD			82	2nd
1973	005; 006	Ford Cosworth DFV 3.0 V8	G	(France) François Cevert	2	10	NC	2	2^{F}	4	3	2	5	2	2	Ret	5	Ret	DNS			82	2nd
1973	005; 006	Ford Cosworth DFV 3.0 V8	G	(New Zealand) Chris Amon														10	WD			82	2nd
1974	005; 006; 007	Ford Cosworth DFV 3.0 V8	G		ARG	BRA	RSA	ESP	BEL	MON	SWE	NED	FRA	GBR	GER	AUT	ITA	CAN	USA			52	3rd
1974	005; 006; 007	Ford Cosworth DFV 3.0 V8	G	(South Africa) Jody Scheckter	Ret	13	8	5	3	2	1	5	4^{F}	1	2^{F}	Ret	3	Ret	Ret			52	3rd
1974	005; 006; 007	Ford Cosworth DFV 3.0 V8	G	(France) Patrick Depailler	6	8	4	8	Ret	9	2^{P}^{F}	6	8	Ret	Ret	Ret	11	5	6			52	3rd
1975	007	Ford Cosworth DFV 3.0 V8	G		ARG	BRA	RSA	ESP	MON	BEL	SWE	NED	FRA	GBR	GER	AUT	ITA	USA				25	5th
1975	007	Ford Cosworth DFV 3.0 V8	G	(South Africa) Jody Scheckter	11	Ret	1	Ret	7	2	7	16	9	3	Ret	8	8	6				25	5th
1975	007	Ford Cosworth DFV 3.0 V8	G	(France) Patrick Depailler	5	Ret	3	Ret	5^{F}	4	12	9	6	9	9	11	7	Ret				25	5th
1975	007	Ford Cosworth DFV 3.0 V8	G	(France) Jean-Pierre Jabouille									12									25	5th
1975	007	Ford Cosworth DFV 3.0 V8	G	(France) Michel Leclère														Ret				25	5th
1976	007; P34	Ford Cosworth DFV 3.0 V8	G		BRA	RSA	USW	ESP	BEL	MON	SWE	FRA	GBR	GER	AUT	NED	ITA	CAN	USA	JPN		71	3rd
1976	007; P34	Ford Cosworth DFV 3.0 V8	G	(South Africa) Jody Scheckter	5	4	Ret	Ret	4	2	1^{P}	6	2	2^{F}	Ret	5	5	4	2	Ret		71	3rd
1976	007; P34	Ford Cosworth DFV 3.0 V8	G	(France) Patrick Depailler	2	9	3	Ret	Ret	3	2	2	Ret	Ret	Ret	7	6	2^{F}	Ret	2		71	3rd
1977	P34	Ford Cosworth DFV 3.0 V8	G		ARG	BRA	RSA	USW	ESP	MON	BEL	SWE	FRA	GBR	GER	AUT	NED	ITA	USA	CAN	JPN	27	5th
1977	P34	Ford Cosworth DFV 3.0 V8	G	(Sweden) Ronnie Peterson	Ret	Ret	Ret	Ret	8	Ret	3	Ret	12	Ret	9	5	Ret	6	16^{F}	Ret	Ret	27	5th
1977	P34	Ford Cosworth DFV 3.0 V8	G	(France) Patrick Depailler	Ret	Ret	3	4	Ret	Ret	8	4	Ret	Ret	Ret	13	Ret	Ret	14	2	3	27	5th
1978	008	Ford Cosworth DFV 3.0 V8	G		ARG	BRA	RSA	USW	MON	BEL	ESP	SWE	FRA	GBR	GER	AUT	NED	ITA	USA	CAN		38	4th
1978	008	Ford Cosworth DFV 3.0 V8	G	(France) Patrick Depailler	3	Ret	2	3	1	Ret	Ret	Ret	Ret	4	Ret	2	Ret	11	Ret	5		38	4th
1978	008	Ford Cosworth DFV 3.0 V8	G	(France) Didier Pironi	14	6	6	Ret	5	6	12	Ret	10	Ret	5	Ret	Ret	Ret	10	7		38	4th
1979	009	Ford Cosworth DFV 3.0 V8	G		ARG	BRA	RSA	USW	ESP	BEL	MON	FRA	GBR	GER	AUT	NED	ITA	CAN	USA			28	5th
1979	009	Ford Cosworth DFV 3.0 V8	G	(France) Didier Pironi	Ret	4	Ret	DSQ	6	3	Ret	Ret	10	9	7	Ret	10	5	3			28	5th
1979	009	Ford Cosworth DFV 3.0 V8	G	(France) Jean-Pierre Jarier	Ret	DNS	3	6	5	11	Ret	5	3			Ret	6	Ret	Ret			28	5th
1979	009	Ford Cosworth DFV 3.0 V8	G	(United Kingdom) Geoff Lees										7								28	5th
1979	009	Ford Cosworth DFV 3.0 V8	G	(Republic of Ireland) Derek Daly											8			Ret	Ret			28	5th
1980	009; 010	Ford Cosworth DFV 3.0 V8	G		ARG	BRA	RSA	USW	BEL	MON	FRA	GBR	GER	AUT	NED	ITA	CAN	USA				12	6th
1980	009; 010	Ford Cosworth DFV 3.0 V8	G	(Republic of Ireland) Derek Daly	4	14	Ret	8	9	Ret	11	4	10	Ret	Ret	Ret	Ret	Ret				12	6th
1980	009; 010	Ford Cosworth DFV 3.0 V8	G	(France) Jean-Pierre Jarier	Ret	12	7	Ret	5	Ret	14	5	15	Ret	5	13	7	NC				12	6th
1980	009; 010	Ford Cosworth DFV 3.0 V8	G	(New Zealand) Mike Thackwell													Ret	DNQ				12	6th
1981	010; 011	Ford Cosworth DFV 3.0 V8	M A		USW	BRA	ARG	SMR	BEL	MON	ESP	FRA	GBR	GER	AUT	NED	ITA	CAN	CPL			10	8th
1981	010; 011	Ford Cosworth DFV 3.0 V8	M A	(United States) Eddie Cheever	5	NC	Ret	Ret	6	5	NC	13	4	5	DNQ	Ret	Ret	12	Ret			10	8th
1981	010; 011	Ford Cosworth DFV 3.0 V8	M A	(United States) Kevin Cogan	DNQ																	10	8th
1981	010; 011	Ford Cosworth DFV 3.0 V8	M A	(Argentina) Ricardo Zunino		13	13															10	8th
1981	010; 011	Ford Cosworth DFV 3.0 V8	M A	(Italy) Michele Alboreto				Ret	12	Ret	DNQ	16	Ret	DNQ	Ret	9	Ret	11	13			10	8th
1982	011	Ford Cosworth DFV 3.0 V8	G		RSA	BRA	USW	SMR	BEL	MON	DET	CAN	NED	GBR	FRA	GER	AUT	SUI	ITA	CPL		25	7th
1982	011	Ford Cosworth DFV 3.0 V8	G	(Sweden) Slim Borgudd	16	7	10															25	7th
1982	011	Ford Cosworth DFV 3.0 V8	G	(United Kingdom) Brian Henton				Ret	Ret	8	9	NC	Ret	8^{F}	10	7	Ret	11	Ret	8		25	7th
1982	011	Ford Cosworth DFV 3.0 V8	G	(Italy) Michele Alboreto	7	4	4	3	Ret	10	Ret	Ret	7	Ret	6	4	Ret	7	5	1^{F}		25	7th
1983	011; 012	Ford Cosworth DFV 3.0 V8	G		BRA	USW	FRA	SMR	MON	BEL	DET	CAN	GBR	GER	AUT	NED	ITA	EUR	RSA			12	7th
1983	011; 012	Ford Cosworth DFV 3.0 V8	G	(United States) Danny Sullivan	11	8	Ret	Ret	5	12	Ret	10	14	12	Ret	Ret	Ret	Ret	7			12	7th
1983	011; 012	Ford Cosworth DFV 3.0 V8	G	(Italy) Michele Alboreto	Ret	9	8	Ret	Ret	14	1	8	13	Ret	Ret	6	Ret	Ret	Ret			12	7th
1984	012	Ford Cosworth DFY 3.0 V8	G		BRA	RSA	BEL	SMR	FRA	MON	CAN	DET	DAL	GBR	GER	AUT	NED	ITA	EUR	POR		0	DSQ (Note: Tyrrell were disqualified from the 1984 World Championship due to a technical infringement.)
1984	012	Ford Cosworth DFY 3.0 V8	G	(United Kingdom) Martin Brundle	DSQ	DSQ	DSQ	DSQ	DSQ	DNQ	DSQ	DSQ	DNQ									0	DSQ
1984	012	Ford Cosworth DFY 3.0 V8	G	(Sweden) Stefan Johansson										DSQ	DSQ	DNQ	DSQ					0	DSQ
1984	012	Ford Cosworth DFY 3.0 V8	G	(Germany) Stefan Bellof	DSQ	DSQ	DSQ	DSQ	DSQ	DSQ	DSQ	DSQ	DSQ	DSQ		EX	DSQ					0	DSQ
1984	012	Ford Cosworth DFY 3.0 V8	G	(New Zealand) Mike Thackwell											DNQ							0	DSQ
1985	012	Ford Cosworth DFV 3.0 V8	G		BRA	POR	SMR	MON	CAN	DET	FRA	GBR	GER	AUT	NED	ITA	BEL	EUR	RSA	AUS		4	9th
1985	012	Ford Cosworth DFV 3.0 V8	G	(United Kingdom) Martin Brundle	8	Ret	9	10	12	Ret			10	DNQ								4	9th
1985	012	Ford Cosworth DFV 3.0 V8	G	(Sweden) Stefan Johansson	7																	4	9th
1985	012	Ford Cosworth DFV 3.0 V8	G	(Germany) Stefan Bellof		6	Ret	DNQ	11	4	13	11										4	9th
1985	014	Renault EF4B 1.5 V6 t	G	(United Kingdom) Martin Brundle							Ret	7			7	8	13	Ret	7	NC		3	10th
1985	014	Renault EF4B 1.5 V6 t	G	(Germany) Stefan Bellof									8	7	Ret							3	10th
1985	014	Renault EF4B 1.5 V6 t	G	(Italy) Ivan Capelli														Ret		4		3	10th
1985	014	Renault EF4B 1.5 V6 t	G	(France) Philippe Streiff															Ret			3	10th
1986	014; 015	Renault EF4B 1.5 V6 t	G		BRA	ESP	SMR	MON	BEL	CAN	DET	FRA	GBR	GER	HUN	AUT	ITA	POR	MEX	AUS		11	7th
1986	014; 015	Renault EF4B 1.5 V6 t	G	(United Kingdom) Martin Brundle	5	Ret	8	Ret	Ret	9	Ret	10	5	Ret	6	Ret	10	Ret	11	4		11	7th
1986	014; 015	Renault EF4B 1.5 V6 t	G	(France) Philippe Streiff	7	Ret	Ret	11	12	11	9	Ret	6	Ret	8	Ret	9	Ret	Ret	5		11	7th
1987	DG016	Ford Cosworth DFZ 3.5 V8	G		BRA	SMR	BEL	MON	DET	FRA	GBR	GER	HUN	AUT	ITA	POR	ESP	MEX	JPN	AUS		11	6th (Note: Winners of the Colin Chapman Trophy, with 169 points.)
1987	DG016	Ford Cosworth DFZ 3.5 V8	G	(United Kingdom) Jonathan Palmer	10	Ret	Ret	5	11	7	8	5	7	14	14	10	Ret	7	8	4		11	6th
1987	DG016	Ford Cosworth DFZ 3.5 V8	G	(France) Philippe Streiff	11	8	9	Ret	Ret	6	Ret	4	9	Ret	12	12	7	8	12	Ret		11	6th
1988	017	Ford Cosworth DFZ 3.5 V8	G		BRA	SMR	MON	MEX	CAN	DET	FRA	GBR	GER	HUN	BEL	ITA	POR	ESP	JPN	AUS		5	8th
1988	017	Ford Cosworth DFZ 3.5 V8	G	(United Kingdom) Jonathan Palmer	Ret	14	5	DNQ	6	5	Ret	Ret	11	Ret	12	DNQ	Ret	Ret	12	Ret		5	8th
1988	017	Ford Cosworth DFZ 3.5 V8	G	(United Kingdom) Julian Bailey	DNQ	Ret	DNQ	DNQ	Ret	9	DNQ	16	DNQ	DNQ	DNQ	12	DNQ	DNQ	14	DNQ		5	8th
1989	017B; 018	Ford Cosworth DFR 3.5 V8	G		BRA	SMR	MON	MEX	USA	CAN	FRA	GBR	GER	HUN	BEL	ITA	POR	ESP	JPN	AUS		16	5th
1989	017B; 018	Ford Cosworth DFR 3.5 V8	G	(United Kingdom) Jonathan Palmer	7	6	9	Ret	9	Ret^{F}	10	Ret	Ret	13	14	Ret	6	10	Ret	DNQ		16	5th
1989	017B; 018	Ford Cosworth DFR 3.5 V8	G	(Italy) Michele Alboreto	10	DNQ	5	3	Ret	Ret												16	5th
1989	017B; 018	Ford Cosworth DFR 3.5 V8	G	(France) Jean Alesi							4	Ret	10	9		5		4	Ret	Ret		16	5th
1989	017B; 018	Ford Cosworth DFR 3.5 V8	G	(United Kingdom) Johnny Herbert											Ret		DNQ					16	5th
1990	018; 019	Ford Cosworth DFR 3.5 V8	P		USA	BRA	SMR	MON	CAN	MEX	FRA	GBR	GER	HUN	BEL	ITA	POR	ESP	JPN	AUS		16	5th
1990	018; 019	Ford Cosworth DFR 3.5 V8	P	(Japan) Satoru Nakajima	6	8	Ret	Ret	11	Ret	Ret	Ret	Ret	Ret	Ret	6	DNS	Ret	6	Ret		16	5th
1990	018; 019	Ford Cosworth DFR 3.5 V8	P	(France) Jean Alesi	2	7	6	2	Ret	7	Ret	8	11	Ret	8	Ret	8	Ret	DNS	8		16	5th
1991	020	Honda RA101E 3.5 V10	P		USA	BRA	SMR	MON	CAN	MEX	FRA	GBR	GER	HUN	BEL	ITA	POR	ESP	JPN	AUS		12	6th
1991	020	Honda RA101E 3.5 V10	P	(Japan) Satoru Nakajima	5	Ret	Ret	Ret	10	12	Ret	8	Ret	15	Ret	Ret	13	17	Ret	Ret		12	6th
1991	020	Honda RA101E 3.5 V10	P	(Italy) Stefano Modena	4	Ret	Ret	Ret	2	11	Ret	7	13	12	Ret	Ret	Ret	16	6	10		12	6th
1992	020B	Ilmor 2175A 3.5 V10	G		RSA	MEX	BRA	ESP	SMR	MON	CAN	FRA	GBR	GER	HUN	BEL	ITA	POR	JPN	AUS		8	6th
1992	020B	Ilmor 2175A 3.5 V10	G	(France) Olivier Grouillard	Ret	Ret	Ret	Ret	8	Ret	12	11	11	Ret	Ret	Ret	Ret	Ret	Ret	Ret		8	6th
1992	020B	Ilmor 2175A 3.5 V10	G	(Italy) Andrea de Cesaris	Ret	5	Ret	Ret	14	Ret	5	Ret	Ret	Ret	8	8	6	9	4	Ret		8	6th
1993	020C; 021	Yamaha OX10A 3.5 V10	G		RSA	BRA	EUR	SMR	ESP	MON	CAN	FRA	GBR	GER	HUN	BEL	ITA	POR	JPN	AUS		0	NC
1993	020C; 021	Yamaha OX10A 3.5 V10	G	(Japan) Ukyo Katayama	Ret	Ret	Ret	Ret	Ret	Ret	17	Ret	13	Ret	10	15	14	Ret	Ret	Ret		0	NC
1993	020C; 021	Yamaha OX10A 3.5 V10	G	(Italy) Andrea de Cesaris	Ret	Ret	Ret	Ret	DSQ	10	Ret	15	NC	Ret	11	Ret	13	12	Ret	13		0	NC
1994	022	Yamaha OX10B 3.5 V10	G		BRA	PAC	SMR	MON	ESP	CAN	FRA	GBR	GER	HUN	BEL	ITA	POR	EUR	JPN	AUS		13	7th
1994	022	Yamaha OX10B 3.5 V10	G	(Japan) Ukyo Katayama	5	Ret	5	Ret	Ret	Ret	Ret	6	Ret	Ret	Ret	Ret	Ret	7	Ret	Ret		13	7th
1994	022	Yamaha OX10B 3.5 V10	G	(United Kingdom) Mark Blundell	Ret	Ret	9	Ret	3	10	10	Ret	Ret	5	5	Ret	Ret	13	Ret	Ret		13	7th
1995	023	Yamaha OX10C 3.0 V10	G		BRA	ARG	SMR	ESP	MON	CAN	FRA	GBR	GER	HUN	BEL	ITA	POR	EUR	PAC	JPN	AUS	5	9th
1995	023	Yamaha OX10C 3.0 V10	G	(Japan) Ukyo Katayama	Ret	8	Ret	Ret	Ret	Ret	Ret	Ret	7	Ret	Ret	10	Ret		14	Ret	Ret	5	9th
1995	023	Yamaha OX10C 3.0 V10	G	(Italy) Gabriele Tarquini														14				5	9th
1995	023	Yamaha OX10C 3.0 V10	G	(Finland) Mika Salo	7	Ret	Ret	10	Ret	7	15	8	Ret	Ret	8	5	13	10	12	6	5	5	9th
1996	024	Yamaha OX11A 3.0 V10	G		AUS	BRA	ARG	EUR	SMR	MON	ESP	CAN	FRA	GBR	GER	HUN	BEL	ITA	POR	JPN		5	8th
1996	024	Yamaha OX11A 3.0 V10	G	(Japan) Ukyo Katayama	11	9	Ret	DSQ	Ret	Ret	Ret	Ret	Ret	Ret	Ret	7	8	10	12	Ret		5	8th
1996	024	Yamaha OX11A 3.0 V10	G	(Finland) Mika Salo	6	5	Ret	DSQ	Ret	5	DSQ	Ret	10	7	9	Ret	7	Ret	11	Ret		5	8th
1997	025	Ford ED4 3.0 V8; Ford ED5 3.0 V8	G		AUS	BRA	ARG	SMR	MON	ESP	CAN	FRA	GBR	GER	HUN	BEL	ITA	AUT	LUX	JPN	EUR	2	10th
1997	025	Ford ED4 3.0 V8; Ford ED5 3.0 V8	G	(Netherlands) Jos Verstappen	Ret	15	Ret	10	8	11	Ret	Ret	Ret	10	Ret	Ret	Ret	12	Ret	13	16	2	10th
1997	025	Ford ED4 3.0 V8; Ford ED5 3.0 V8	G	(Finland) Mika Salo	Ret	13	8	9	5	Ret	Ret	Ret	Ret	Ret	13	11	Ret	Ret	10	Ret	12	2	10th
1998	026	Ford JD Zetec-R 3.0 V10	G		AUS	BRA	ARG	SMR	ESP	MON	CAN	FRA	GBR	AUT	GER	HUN	BEL	ITA	LUX	JPN		0	NC
1998	026	Ford JD Zetec-R 3.0 V10	G	(Brazil) Ricardo Rosset	Ret	Ret	14	Ret	DNQ	DNQ	8	Ret	Ret	12	DNQ	DNQ	DNS	12	Ret	DNQ		0	NC
1998	026	Ford JD Zetec-R 3.0 V10	G	(Japan) Toranosuke Takagi	Ret	Ret	12	Ret	13	11	Ret	Ret	9	Ret	13	14	Ret	9	16	Ret		0	NC

== Results of other Tyrrell cars ==
Formula One World Championship results for Tyrrell cars entered by other teams.

(key)

Year	Entrant	Chassis	Engine(s)	Tyres	Drivers	1	2	3	4	5	6	7	8	9	10	11	12	13	14	15	16	17
1973						ARG	BRA	RSA	ESP	BEL	MON	SWE	FRA	GBR	NED	GER	AUT	ITA	CAN	USA		
1973	Lucky Strike Racing	Tyrrell 004	Ford 3.0 V8	G	(South Africa) Eddie Keizan			NC														
1974						ARG	BRA	RSA	ESP	BEL	MON	SWE	NED	FRA	GBR	GER	AUT	ITA	CAN	USA		
1974	Blignaut Embassy Racing	Tyrrell 004	Ford 3.0 V8	F	(South Africa) Eddie Keizan			14														
1975						ARG	BRA	RSA	ESP	MON	BEL	SWE	NED	FRA	GBR	GER	AUT	ITA	USA			
1975	Lexington Racing	Tyrrell 007	Ford 3.0 V8	G	(South Africa) Ian Scheckter			Ret														
1976						BRA	RSA	USW	ESP	BEL	MON	SWE	FRA	GBR	GER	AUT	NED	ITA	CAN	USA	JPN	
1976	Lexington Racing	Tyrrell 007	Ford 3.0 V8	G	(South Africa) Ian Scheckter		Ret															
1976	Scuderia Gulf Rondini	Tyrrell 007	Ford 3.0 V8	G	(Italy) Alessandro Pesenti-Rossi										14	11	DNQ	18				
1976	ÖASC Racing Team	Tyrrell 007	Ford 3.0 V8	G	(Austria) Otto Stuppacher													DNS	DNQ	DNQ		
1976	Heros Racing	Tyrrell 007	Ford 3.0 V8	B	(Japan) Kazuyoshi Hoshino																Ret	
1977						ARG	BRA	RSA	USW	ESP	MON	BEL	SWE	FRA	GBR	GER	AUT	NED	ITA	USA	CAN	JPN
1977	Meiritsu Racing Team	Tyrrell 007	Ford 3.0 V8	D	(Japan) Kunimitsu Takahashi																	9

== Non-championship results ==
(key)

Year	Entry	Chassis	Engine	Driver	1	2	3	4	5	6	7	8
1967	Tyrrell Racing Organisation	Matra MS7	Cosworth FVA		ROC	SPC	INT	SYR	OUL	ESP		
1967	Tyrrell Racing Organisation	Matra MS7	Cosworth FVA	(United Kingdom) Jackie Stewart					2	Ret		
1967	Tyrrell Racing Organisation	Matra MS5	Cosworth FVA	(Belgium) Jacky Ickx					Ret	6		
1968	Matra International	Matra MS10	Cosworth DFV		ROC	INT	OUL					
1968	Matra International	Matra MS10	Cosworth DFV	(United Kingdom) Jackie Stewart	6		1^{F}					
1969	Matra International	Matra MS80	Cosworth DFV		ROC	INT	MAD	OUL				
1969	Matra International	Matra MS80	Cosworth DFV	(United Kingdom) Jackie Stewart	1			9^{F}				
1969	Matra International	Matra MS10	Cosworth DFV	(United Kingdom) Jackie Stewart		3^{P} (Note: Stewart qualified for pole in the MS80 but raced in the MS10.)						
1970	Tyrrell Racing Organisation	March 701	Cosworth DFV		ROC	INT	OUL					
1970	Tyrrell Racing Organisation	March 701	Cosworth DFV	(United Kingdom) Jackie Stewart	1^{P}	2						
1970	Tyrrell Racing Organisation	Tyrrell 001	Cosworth DFV	(United Kingdom) Jackie Stewart			NC^{F}					
1971	Elf Team Tyrrell	Tyrrell 001	Cosworth DFV		ARG	ROC	QUE	SPR	INT	RIN	OUL	VIC
1971	Elf Team Tyrrell	Tyrrell 001	Cosworth DFV	(United Kingdom) Jackie Stewart		2^{P}	2^{P}	3^{P} (Note: Stewart practised in a Tyrrell 002 but opted to race the 001.)				
1971	Elf Team Tyrrell	Tyrrell 003	Cosworth DFV	(United Kingdom) Jackie Stewart					NC^{F}			3
1971	Elf Team Tyrrell	Tyrrell 002	Cosworth DFV	(France) François Cevert								7
1972	Elf Team Tyrrell	Tyrrell 003	Cosworth DFV		ROC	BRA	INT	OUL	REP	VIC		
1972	Elf Team Tyrrell	Tyrrell 003	Cosworth DFV	(United Kingdom) Jackie Stewart			DNA					
1973	Elf Team Tyrrell	Tyrrell 006	Cosworth DFV		ROC	INT						
1973	Elf Team Tyrrell	Tyrrell 006	Cosworth DFV	(United Kingdom) Jackie Stewart		1						
1974	Elf Team Tyrrell	Tyrrell 006	Cosworth DFV		PRE	ROC	INT					
1974	Elf Team Tyrrell	Tyrrell 006	Cosworth DFV	(South Africa) Jody Scheckter	2							
1975	Elf Team Tyrrell	Tyrrell 007	Cosworth DFV		ROC	INT	SUI					
1975	Elf Team Tyrrell	Tyrrell 007	Cosworth DFV	(South Africa) Jody Scheckter	Ret							
1975	Elf Team Tyrrell	Tyrrell 007	Cosworth DFV	(France) Patrick Depailler		5	2					
1976	Elf Team Tyrrell	Tyrrell 007	Cosworth DFV		ROC	INT						
1976	Elf Team Tyrrell	Tyrrell 007	Cosworth DFV	(South Africa) Jody Scheckter	Ret^{P}	3						
1977	First National City Travelers Checks Elf Team Tyrrell	Tyrrell P34	Cosworth DFV		ROC							
1977	First National City Travelers Checks Elf Team Tyrrell	Tyrrell P34	Cosworth DFV	(Sweden) Ronnie Peterson	Ret							
1978	First National City Travelers Checks Elf Team Tyrrell	Tyrrell 008	Cosworth DFV		INT							
1978	First National City Travelers Checks Elf Team Tyrrell	Tyrrell 008	Cosworth DFV	(France) Patrick Depailler	Ret							
1979	Candy Team Tyrrell	Tyrrell 009	Cosworth DFV		ROC	GNM	DIN					
1979	Candy Team Tyrrell	Tyrrell 009	Cosworth DFV	(France) Jean-Pierre Jarier			5					
1979	Melchester Racing	Tyrrell 008	Cosworth DFV	(South Africa) Desiré Wilson	9							
1979	Melchester Racing	Tyrrell 008	Cosworth DFV	(United States) Gordon Smiley	10							
1980	Candy Team Tyrrell	Tyrrell 010	Cosworth DFV		ESP							
1980	Candy Team Tyrrell	Tyrrell 010	Cosworth DFV	(France) Jean-Pierre Jarier	4							
1981	Tyrrell Racing Team	Tyrrell 010	Cosworth DFV		RSA							
1981	Tyrrell Racing Team	Tyrrell 010	Cosworth DFV	(United States) Eddie Cheever	7							
1981	Tyrrell Racing Team	Tyrrell 010	Cosworth DFV	(South Africa) Desiré Wilson	Ret							
1983	Benetton Tyrrell Team	Tyrrell 011	Cosworth DFV		ROC							
1983	Benetton Tyrrell Team	Tyrrell 011	Cosworth DFV	(United States) Danny Sullivan	2							
