= Matra MS80 =

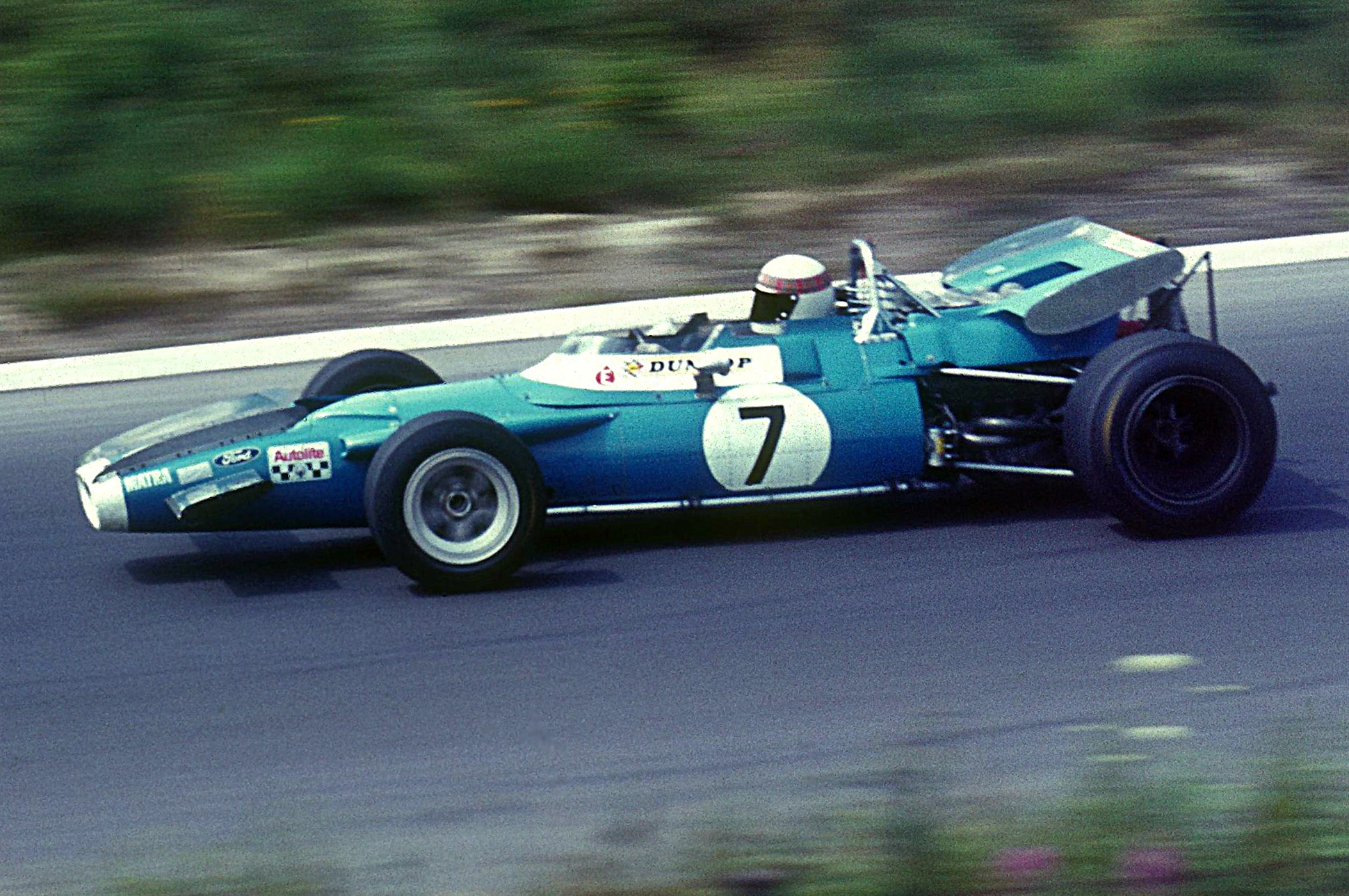
- Jackie Stewart driving the MS80 at the 1969 German Grand Prix
- Category: Formula One
- Constructor: Matra
- Designers: Gérard Ducarouge; Bernard Boyer
- Predecessor: MS10 / MS11
- Successor: MS84 / MS120

Technical specifications
- Chassis: Aluminium monocoque
- Engine: Ford Cosworth DFV 2,993 cc (182.6 cu in) V8 NA mid-engined
- Transmission: Hewland DG300 5 speed
- Weight: 540 kg (1,190.5 lb)
- Fuel: Elf
- Tyres: Dunlop

Competition history
- Notable entrants: Matra International
- Notable drivers: (United Kingdom) Jackie Stewart (France) Jean-Pierre Beltoise
- Debut: 1969 Spanish Grand Prix
Races	Wins	Podiums	Poles	F/Laps
10	5	9	2	5
- Constructors' Championships: 1 (1969)
- Drivers' Championships: 1 (Jackie Stewart, 1969)
- Unless otherwise stated, all data refer to Formula One World Championship Grands Prix only.

The Matra MS80 was the fourth Formula One car produced by Matra (following the MS9, MS10 and MS11). The Ford Cosworth DFV-powered car (engine 3000 cc, estimated at around 420 bhp (313 kW)) took Jackie Stewart to the Formula One World Championship title in 1969.

== History ==
The car, designed under the direction of Gérard Ducarouge and Bernard Boyer, was built at Matra's Formula One base at Vélizy-Villacoublay in the southwestern suburbs of Paris, though the final completion with the Cosworth engine was done in the Tyrrell workshop of East Horsley near Ripley, UK. A major change from the MS10 was the location of the fuel cell, which was moved from behind the driver and placed in sidepods by the driver's hips, giving the car a slight 'Coke bottle' appearance. The rocker-arm front suspension was replaced by outboard springs, with a parallel link set up on the rear suspension.

Apart from Ferrari cars, the Matra MS80 is the only non-British built car to win the Formula One World Constructors' Championship (the French-licensed constructor Renault, the Austrian-licensed constructor Red Bull and the German-licensed constructor Mercedes built their winning cars in the UK) as well as the only car built in France to help a driver win the World Drivers' Championship.

Although built by the French constructor Matra, the car was run by the British Matra International privateer team of Ken Tyrrell and, as such, remains the only car not entered by a works team to win the Formula One World Constructors' Championship as well as to help a driver win the World Drivers' Championship. The MS80 was one of the first F1 racing cars to be designed with "wings" for downforce to increase high-speed tyre grip. These were originally introduced into F1 in 1968. Due to some serious racing accidents with the flimsy 1969-type high wing constructions early in the racing season, like all 1969 F1 cars the MS80 was altered to use more sturdy lowered wings, directly attached to the car's body, later on.

Only two MS80s were assembled in 1969, a third monocoque was built but remained un-assembled until the EPAF company made it a complete car in 2006.

== Aftermath ==
In a 2006 issue of Motor Sport magazine, Stewart referred to the MS80 as the nicest-handling F1 car he had ever driven.

== Gallery ==
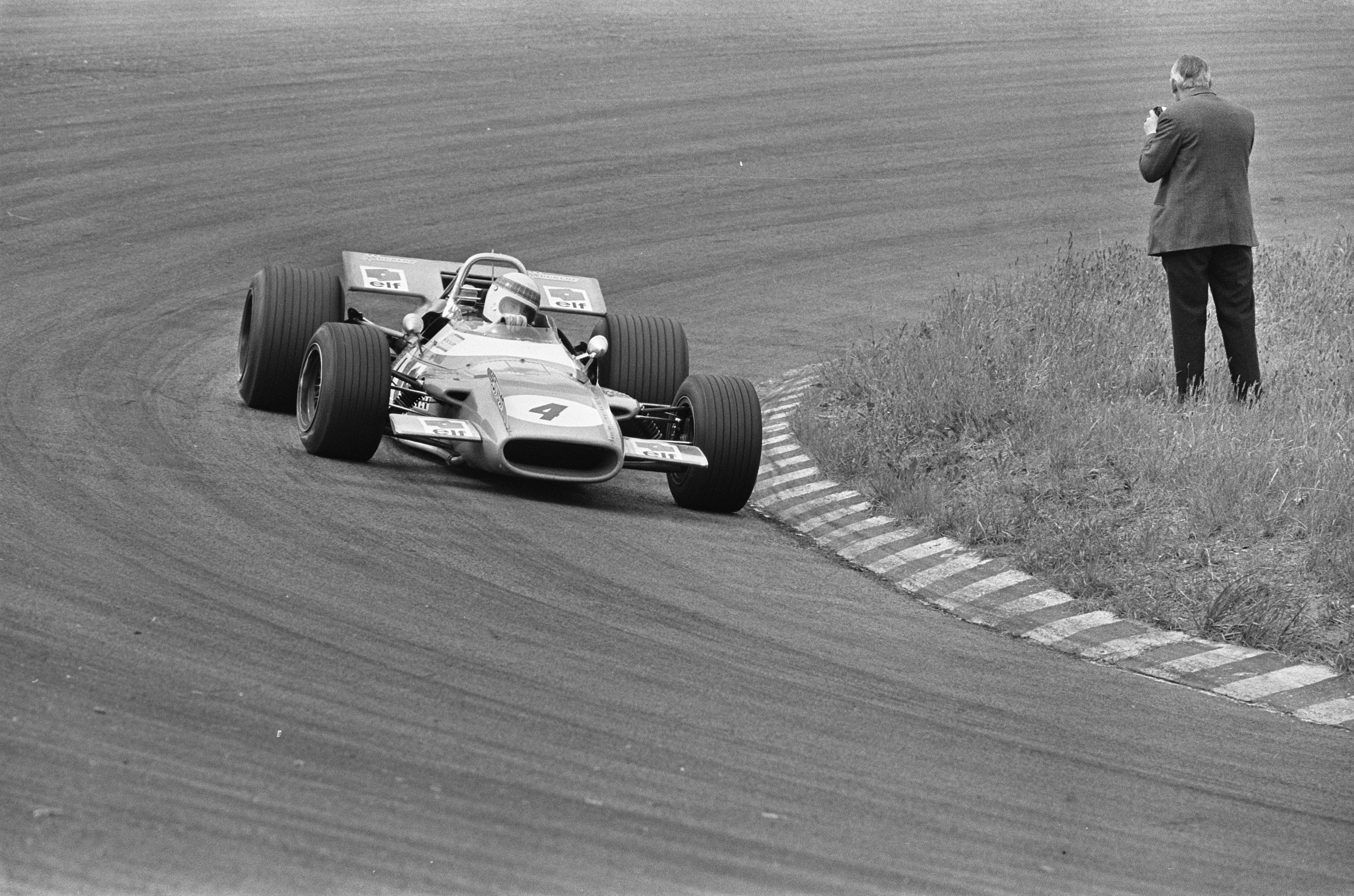
Jackie Stewart driving the MS80 at the 1969 Dutch Grand Prix

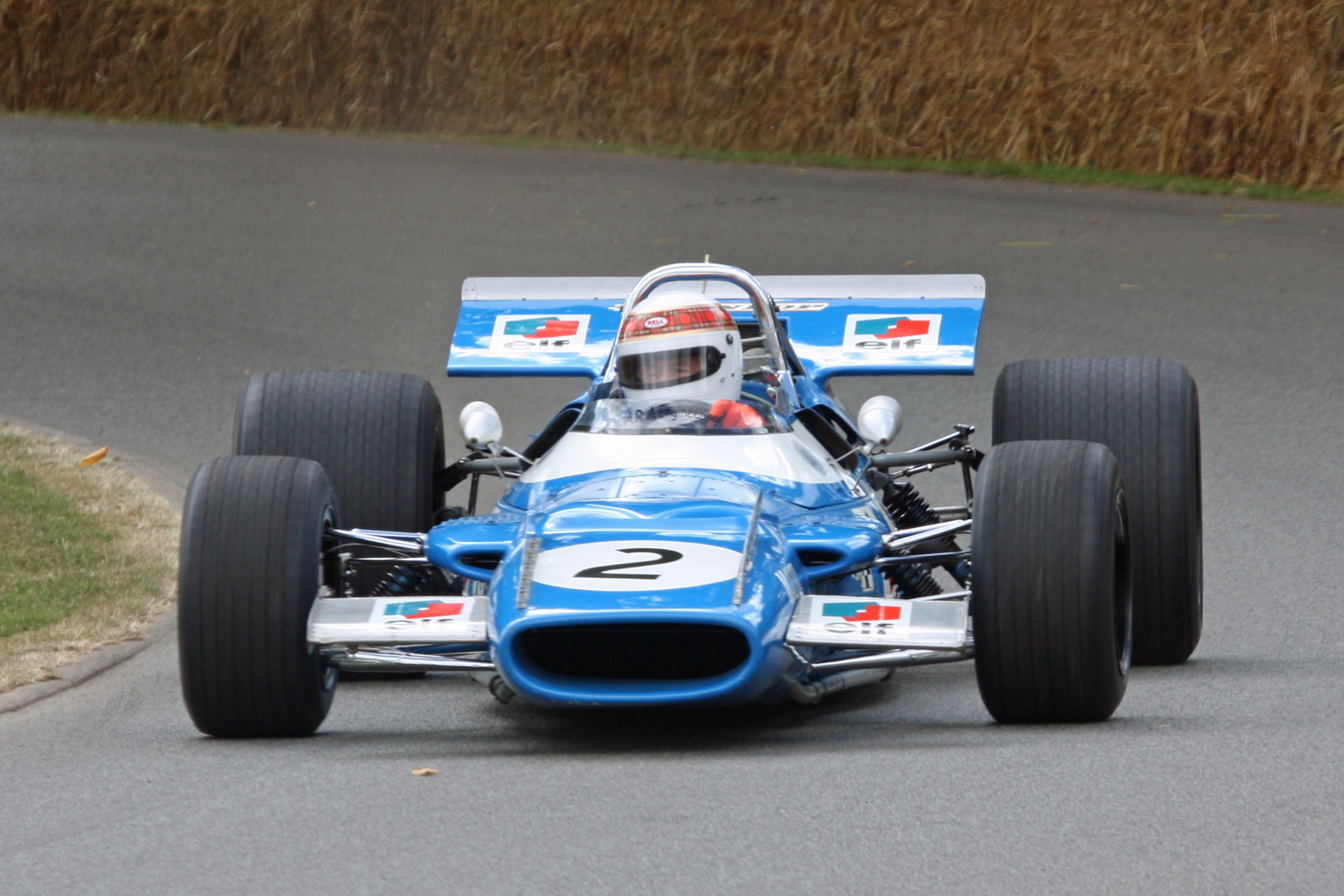
The MS80 being presented at the 2009 Goodwood Festival of Speed

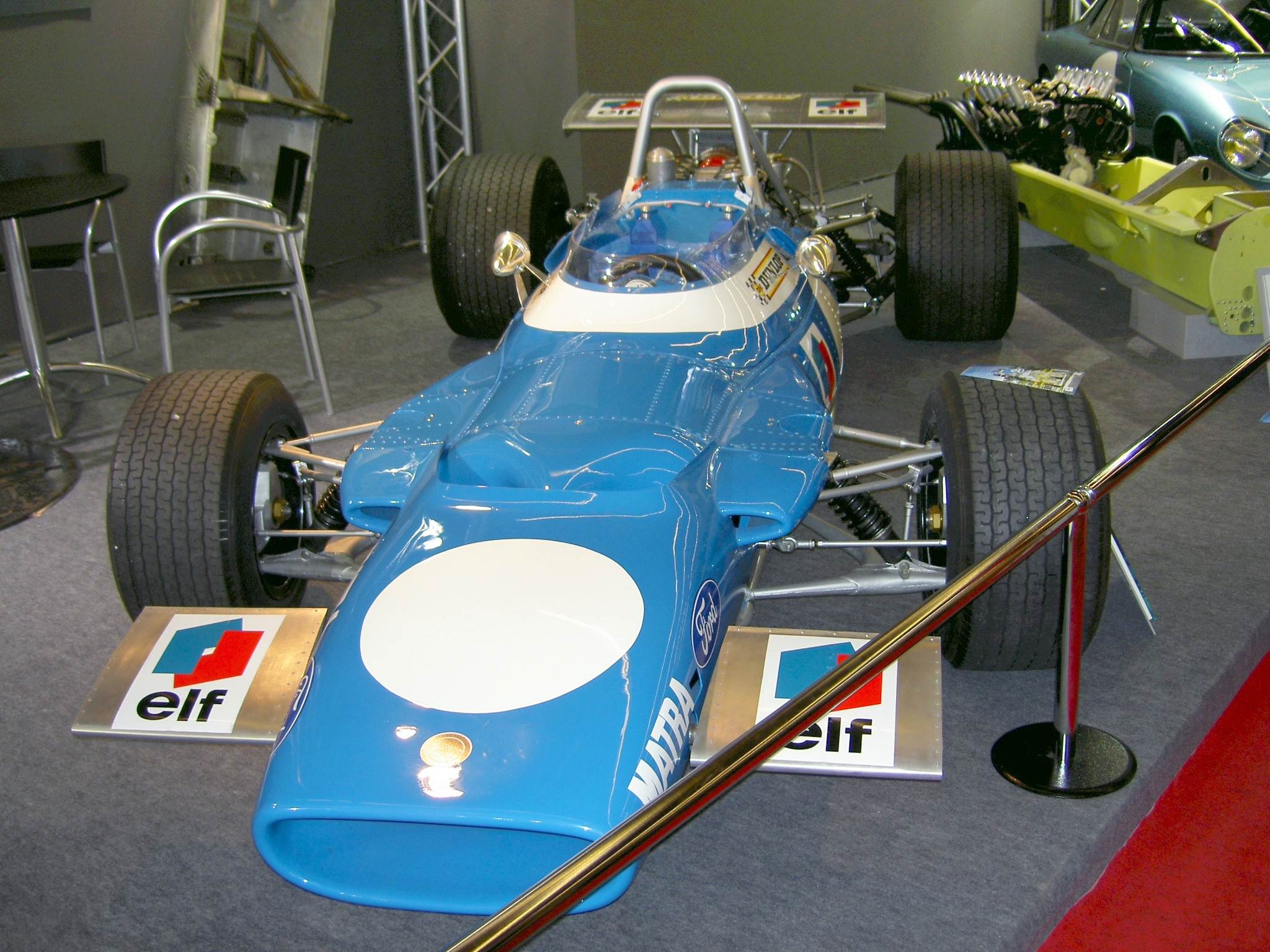
The F1 Matra MS80 victorious in 1969

== Complete Formula One World Championship results ==
(key) (results in bold indicate pole position; results in italics indicate fastest lap)

Year	Entrant	Engine	Tyres	Drivers	1	2	3	4	5	6	7	8	9	10	11	Points	WCC
1969	Matra International	Ford Cosworth DFV; 3.0 V8	**D**		RSA	ESP	MON	NED	FRA	GBR	GER	ITA	CAN	USA	MEX	**66**^{1}	**1st**
1969	Matra International	Ford Cosworth DFV; 3.0 V8	**D**	Jackie Stewart		1	**Ret**	1	**1**	1	2	1	Ret	Ret	4	**66**^{1}	**1st**
1969	Matra International	Ford Cosworth DFV; 3.0 V8	**D**	Jean-Pierre Beltoise		3	Ret	8	2		12	3	4	Ret	5	**66**^{1}	**1st**

^{1} Includes 9 points scored using a Matra MS10 and 1 point scored using a Matra MS84.

Matra-Cosworth MS80
