= Privateer (motorsport) =

Motorsport entrant without manufacturer support

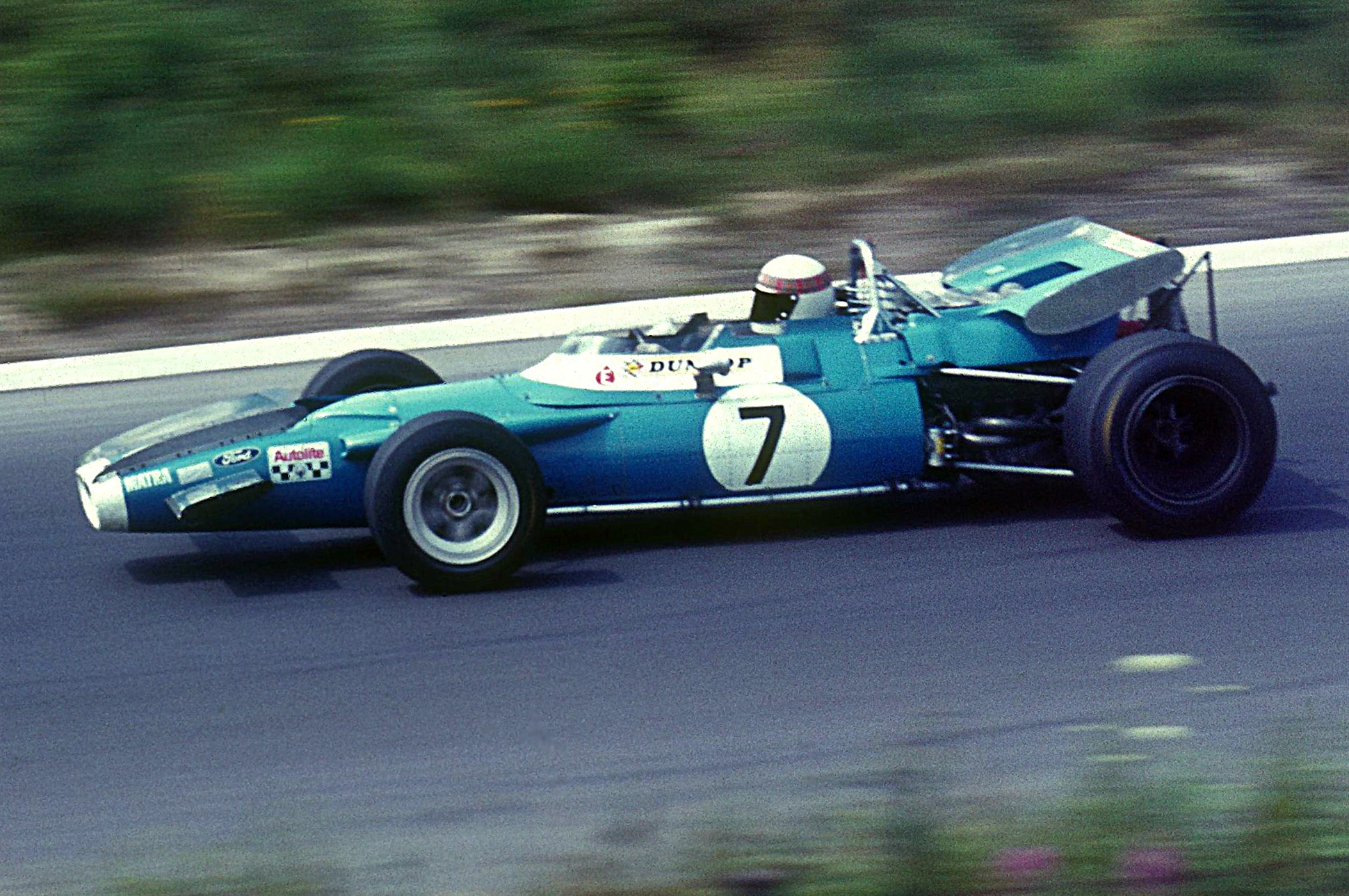
Jackie Stewart driving the Matra MS80-Ford car entered by Ken Tyrrell's privateer team Matra International in 1969 when this team became the only privateer team in F1 history which helped a constructor to win the World Constructors' Championship and a driver to win the World Drivers' Championship.

In motorsport, a privateer is usually an entrant into a racing event that is not directly supported by an automobile or motorcycle manufacturer. Privateers teams are often found competing in rally, circuit racing and motorcycle racing events and often include competitors who build and maintain their own vehicles and motorcycles. In previous Formula One seasons, privately owned teams would race using the chassis of another team or constructor in preference to building their own car; the Concorde Agreement now effectively prohibits this practice. Increasingly, the term is being used in a Formula One context to refer to teams that are not at least part-owned by large corporations. Many privateer entrants compete for the enjoyment of the sport, and are not paid to be racing drivers.

== Privateers in Formula One ==
From the inaugural 1950 season until the 1981 season, several privateer teams entered cars at Formula One Grands Prix. Some of them—such as Tyrrell and Williams—later began to build their own cars and thus became constructors, as well as works teams. During the 1950 season cars were entered by 30 teams; 4 works teams (Alfa Romeo, Ferrari, Maserati, and Talbot-Lago) and 26 privateer teams. However, the number of privateer teams decreased over the years (e.g. a Ferrari car was entered by a privateer team last time at the 1966 Italian Grand Prix) and at the 1981 Spanish Grand Prix Equipe Banco Occidental became the last privateer team to enter Formula One, using a Williams car. Privateer entries have been prohibited in Formula One since 1981 under the first Concorde Agreement.

=== List of privateer teams ===
The following are privateer teams which never built their own chassis, and thus did not become constructors, in case of Matra International only after renaming to Tyrrell:

- (United Kingdom) AE Moss (1954)
- (United Kingdom) Bernard White Racing (1966–1968)
- (Italy) BMS Scuderia Italia (1988–1993)
- (United Kingdom) British Formula One Racing Team (1977)
- (United Kingdom) BS Fabrications (1976–1978)
- (United States) Camoradi International (1959–1961)
- (United Kingdom) DW Racing Enterprises (1963–1967)
- (Belgium) Ecurie Belge (1950–1953)
- (France) Ecurie Bleue (1950, 1959–1960)
- (Sweden) Ecurie Bonnier (1957–1958, 1966–1971)
- (United Kingdom) Ecurie Ecosse (1952–1954)
- (Switzerland) Ecurie Espadon (1950–1952)
- (France) Ecurie Lutetia (1950)
- (Netherlands) Ecurie Maarsbergen (1957–1964)
- (France) Ecurie Rosier (1950–1956)
- (Switzerland) Enrico Platé (Note: In 1952 and 1953 Scuderia Platé built their own engines for the Maserati-Platé 4CLT.) (1950–1953)
- (Spain) Equipe Banco Occidental (1981)
- (United Kingdom) Equipe Moss (1954)
- (Brazil) Escuderia Bandeirantes (1951–1953)
- (Italy) FISA (1961)
- (United Kingdom) FR Gerard Cars (1950–1951, 1953–1954, 1956–1957)
- (United Kingdom) Goldie Hexagon Racing (1974)
- (Australia) John Willment Automobiles (1964–1965)
- (United Kingdom) Matra International (1968–1969) (Note: Joint-venture between Ken Tyrrell's own privateer team and a constructor Matra entering cars built by Matra. In 1970 Ken Tyrrell founded the Tyrrell Racing Organisation team which entered March and later Tyrrell cars, whereas Matra entered their cars by their own works team.)
- (United States) Mecom Racing Team (1962)
- (United States) North American Racing Team (1964–1965, 1969)
- (South Africa) Otelle Nucci (1962–1963, 1965)
- (United Kingdom) Reg Parnell Racing (1959, 1961–1969)
- (United Kingdom) Rob Walker Racing Team (1953–1955, 1957–1970)
- (Italy) Scuderia Achille Varzi (1950)
- (Italy) Scuderia Ambrosiana (1950–1951, 1954)
- (Italy) Scuderia Centro Sud (1957–1961, 1963–1965)
- (Switzerland) Scuderia Filipinetti (1962–1963)
- (United Kingdom) Scuderia Franera (1952)
- (Italy) Scuderia Sant'Ambroeus (1961)
- (Argentina) Scuderia Sud Americana (1958)
- (Switzerland) Silvio Moser Racing Team (1966, 1969–1970)
- (United Kingdom) T.A.S.O. Mathieson (1953)
- (Rhodesia) Team Gunston (1962–1963, 1965, 1967–1972, 1974–1975)

=== Privateer wins at Formula One Grands Prix ===
Across 32 seasons, only three privateer teams achieved 20 victories in total: Matra International/Tyrrell Racing won 10 races, Rob Walker Racing Team won 9 races and FISA won one race. The first win was achieved by Walker at the 1958 Argentine Grand Prix, and the last win was achieved by Tyrrell at the 1970 Spanish Grand Prix.

In contrast to the others, Tyrrell would develop into a constructor in their own right. Stuart entered the last three races in 1970 with their own chassis already; teammate François Cevert still used the March chassis for the whole season. In the next season 1971, Tyrrell dominated with their own chassis and won both titles.

| No. | Driver | Entrant | Chassis | Engine | Tyres | Grand Prix |
|---|---|---|---|---|---|---|
| 1 | (United Kingdom) Stirling Moss | (United Kingdom) R.R.C. Walker Racing Team | Cooper T43 | Climax FPF 2.0 L4 | D | 1958 Argentine |
| 2 | (France) Maurice Trintignant | (United Kingdom) R.R.C. Walker Racing Team | Cooper T45 | Climax FPF 2.0 L4 | D | 1958 Monaco |
| 3 | (United Kingdom) Stirling Moss | (United Kingdom) R.R.C. Walker Racing Team | Cooper T51 | Climax FPF 2.5 L4 | D | 1959 Portuguese |
| 4 | (United Kingdom) Stirling Moss | (United Kingdom) R.R.C. Walker Racing Team | Cooper T51 | Climax FPF 2.5 L4 | D | 1959 Italian |
| 5 | (United Kingdom) Stirling Moss | (United Kingdom) R.R.C. Walker Racing Team | Lotus 18 | Climax FPF 2.5 L4 | D | 1960 Monaco |
| 6 | (United Kingdom) Stirling Moss | (United Kingdom) R.R.C. Walker Racing Team | Lotus 18 | Climax FPF 2.5 L4 | D | 1960 United States |
| 7 | (United Kingdom) Stirling Moss | (United Kingdom) R.R.C. Walker Racing Team | Lotus 18 | Climax FPF 1.5 L4 | D | 1961 Monaco |
| 8 | (Italy) Giancarlo Baghetti | (Italy) FISA | Ferrari 156 | Ferrari Type 178 1.5 V6 | D | 1961 French |
| 9 | (United Kingdom) Stirling Moss | (United Kingdom) R.R.C. Walker Racing Team | Lotus 18/21 | Climax FPF 1.5 L4 | D | 1961 German |
| 10 | (United Kingdom) Jackie Stewart | (United Kingdom) Matra International | Matra MS10 | Ford Cosworth DFV 3.0 V8 | D | 1968 Dutch |
| 11 | (Switzerland) Jo Siffert | (United Kingdom) Rob Walker/Jack Durlacher Racing Team | Lotus 49B | Ford Cosworth DFV 3.0 V8 | F | 1968 British |
| 12 | (United Kingdom) Jackie Stewart | (United Kingdom) Matra International | Matra MS10 | Ford Cosworth DFV 3.0 V8 | D | 1968 German |
| 13 | (United Kingdom) Jackie Stewart | (United Kingdom) Matra International | Matra MS10 | Ford Cosworth DFV 3.0 V8 | D | 1968 United States |
| 14 | (United Kingdom) Jackie Stewart | (United Kingdom) Matra International | Matra MS10 | Ford Cosworth DFV 3.0 V8 | D | 1969 South African |
| 15 | (United Kingdom) Jackie Stewart | (United Kingdom) Matra International | Matra MS80 | Ford Cosworth DFV 3.0 V8 | D | 1969 Spanish |
| 16 | (United Kingdom) Jackie Stewart | (United Kingdom) Matra International | Matra MS80 | Ford Cosworth DFV 3.0 V8 | D | 1969 Dutch |
| 17 | (United Kingdom) Jackie Stewart | (United Kingdom) Matra International | Matra MS80 | Ford Cosworth DFV 3.0 V8 | D | 1969 French |
| 18 | (United Kingdom) Jackie Stewart | (United Kingdom) Matra International | Matra MS80 | Ford Cosworth DFV 3.0 V8 | D | 1969 British |
| 19 | (United Kingdom) Jackie Stewart | (United Kingdom) Matra International | Matra MS80 | Ford Cosworth DFV 3.0 V8 | D | 1969 Italian |
| 20 | (United Kingdom) Jackie Stewart | (United Kingdom) Tyrrell Racing Organisation | March 701 | Ford Cosworth DFV 3.0 V8 | D | 1970 Spanish |

Key: (Bold) Driver won the World Drivers' Championship; (Italics) Constructor won the World Constructors' Championship

=== Formula One World Championships by privateer teams ===
Across 32 seasons, only one privateer team contributed to a Formula One World Championship: Matra International in 1969. The team—since 1970 known as Tyrrell Racing Organisation—helped both constructor Matra win the World Constructors' Championship (with the MS80), and driver Jackie Stewart win his maiden World Drivers' Championship.

== See also ==
- Factory-backed
