= Matra MS9 =

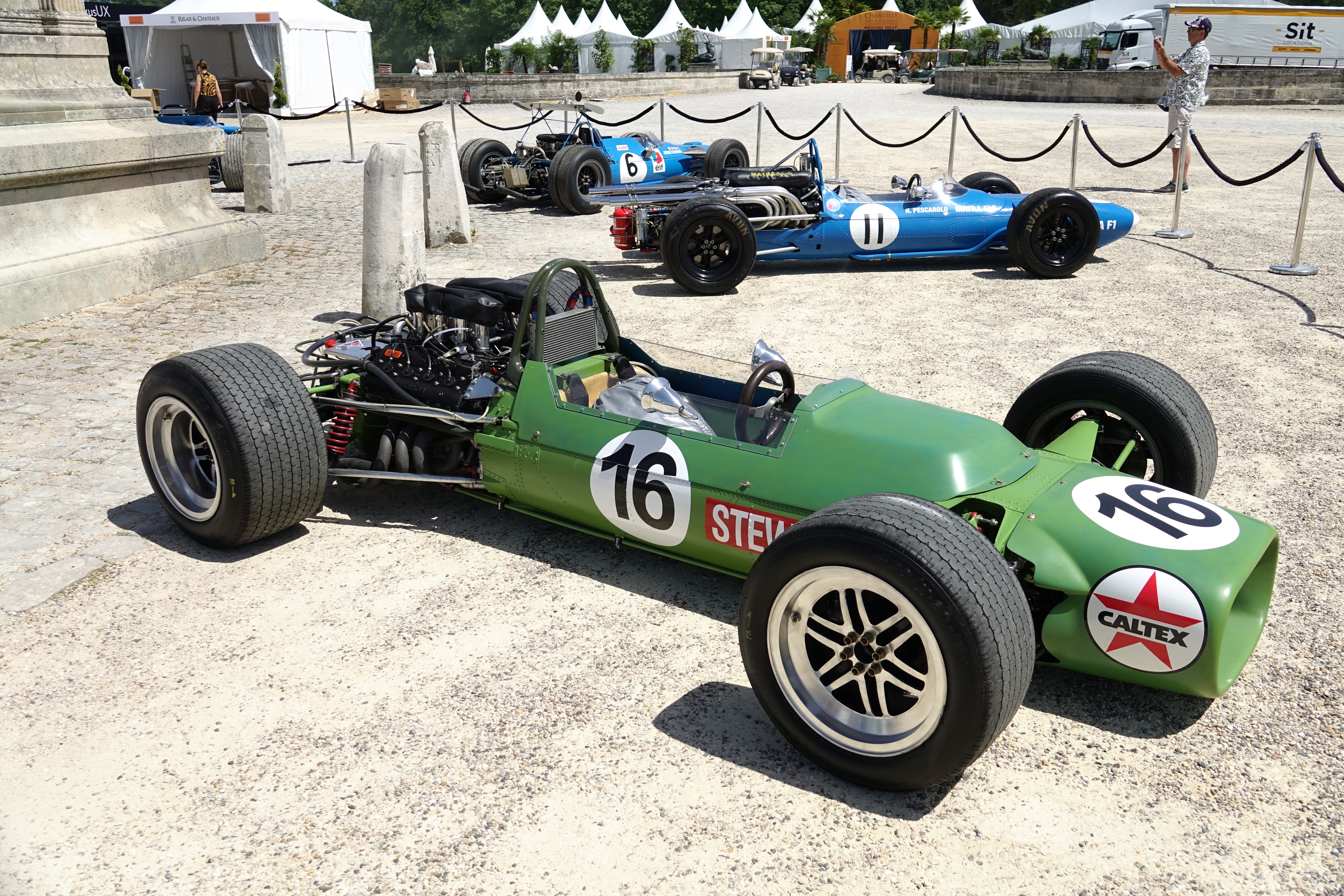
- Category: Formula One
- Constructor: Matra
- Designers: Gerard Ducarouge; Bernard Boyer
- Predecessor: MS7
- Successor: MS10

Technical specifications
- Chassis: Aluminium monocoque
- Engine: Ford Cosworth DFV 2,993 cc (182.6 cu in) V8 NA mid-engined
- Transmission: Hewland 5 speed
- Weight: 540 kg (1,190.5 lb)
- Fuel: Elf
- Tyres: Dunlop

Competition history
- Notable entrants: Matra International
- Notable drivers: (United Kingdom) Jackie Stewart
- Debut: 1968 South African Grand Prix
Races	Wins	Podiums	Poles	F/Laps
1	0	0	0	0
- Constructors' Championships: 0
- Drivers' Championships: 0
- Unless otherwise stated, all data refer to Formula One World Championship Grands Prix only.

The Matra MS9 was a Formula One car used by the Matra International team during the 1968 Formula One season. It only raced once in a world championship race, driven by Jackie Stewart at the 1968 South African Grand Prix, before being replaced by the Matra MS10. At its only outing, it qualified third, but Stewart had to retire due to a connecting rod failure.

== Concept ==
After success with their Formula 2 programme, Matra had plans to compete in Formula 1 with a car powered by their own Matra Sports V12 engine. However, Ken Tyrrell, who had run Matras in his own Formula 2 team, persuaded Matra to construct a car powered by the Cosworth DFV engine. To develop the concept, a Matra MS7 F2 car was modified to take a DFV, with suspension components taken from the Matra Group 6 sports car.

== Racing history ==
Despite its role as a development car, the MS9 was entered into the 1968 South African Grand Prix, as the MS10 was deemed to be not ready. Still in its pale green primer coat, Jackie Stewart was immediately comfortable with the car and eventually qualified third on the grid behind the Lotus 49s of Jim Clark and Graham Hill. The intense heat at Kyalami led to cooling problems, and the nose-cone off the car was widened to improve airflow. An additional radiator was also fitted at the rear of the car. In the race itself, Stewart beat the Lotuses at the start but was soon overtaken by Clark and then some time later by Hill. Just after half-distance a broken connecting-rod punched through the side of the engine and the new car's race, and its racing career, was over.

== Complete Formula One World Championship results ==
(key) (results in bold indicate pole position; results in italics indicate fastest lap)

Year	Entrant	Engine	Tyres	Drivers	1	2	3	4	5	6	7	8	9	10	11	12	Points	WCC
1968	Matra International	Ford Cosworth DFV; 3.0 V8	**D**		RSA	ESP	MON	BEL	NED	FRA	GBR	GER	ITA	CAN	USA	MEX	**45**^{1}	**3rd**
1968	Matra International	Ford Cosworth DFV; 3.0 V8	**D**	Jackie Stewart	Ret												**45**^{1}	**3rd**

^{1} All points scored using the MS7 and MS10 models.
