= 1968 Spanish Grand Prix =

- The Jarama Circuit (1967–1990)

Race details
- Date: 12 May 1968
- Official name: XIV Gran Premio de España
- Location: Circuito Permanente del Jarama, Madrid, Spain
- Course: Permanent racing facility
- Course length: 3.404 km (2.115 miles)
- Distance: 90 laps, 306.360 km (190.363 miles)
- Weather: Hot, Dry

Pole position
Driver	(New Zealand) Chris Amon	Ferrari
- Time: 1:27.9

Fastest lap
Driver	(France) Jean-Pierre Beltoise	Matra-Ford
- Time: 1:28.3 on lap 47

Podium
First	(United Kingdom) Graham Hill	Lotus-Ford
Second	(New Zealand) Denny Hulme	McLaren-Ford
Third	(United Kingdom) Brian Redman	Cooper-BRM

The 1968 Spanish Grand Prix was a Formula One motor race held at Jarama Circuit on 12 May 1968. It was race 2 of 12 in both the 1968 World Championship of Drivers and the 1968 International Cup for Formula One Manufacturers. It was the first race after the death of former double World Champion Jim Clark, who had died in a non-championship Formula Two event in Hockenheim, Germany the previous month. Clark had led the drivers' championship before this race, on 9 points, after he won in the first race in South Africa.

== Background ==
Following Jim Clark's death in Germany, and the death of his replacement Mike Spence during practice for the Indianapolis 500 just five days before the race, team principal Colin Chapman opted not to come to Spain for the first championship Spanish Grand Prix since 1954, still being devastated by the losses. Graham Hill was the only works Lotus driver; a second car was entered for Jackie Oliver but could not be set up in time. The race saw the first appearance of Team Lotus in the red, gold and white colors of Imperial Tobacco's Gold Leaf brand as their title sponsor instead of the traditional British racing green, making them the first works team (second only to Team Gunston entering a private Brabham car at the 1968 South African Grand Prix) to paint their cars in the livery of their sponsors. Jackie Stewart was absent due to a wrist injury he sustained while driving in a Formula Two race, so it was up to Jean-Pierre Beltoise to debut the new Matra MS10.

== Report ==
During qualifying, Ferrari's Chris Amon took his first ever pole position with Graham Hill for the mourning Team Lotus down in sixth place.

Lotus fate turned however during the race on Sunday, contested in searing heat. Pedro Rodríguez took the lead at the start in his BRM, followed by Beltoise, Amon and Hulme. The Frenchman moved into the lead on lap 12, only to drop back four laps later with engine troubles. Amon was now back in the lead, followed closely by Rodriguez until the Mexican spun and crashed on lap 28. While he waited for his mechanics to pick up the car, spectators "descended on the car like vultures and stripped off the mirrors, seat, windscreen and nose cowling". These retirements elevated Hill to second place behind Amon, who suffered a fuel pump failure on lap 58, handing Hill, who had been a mile behind, first place and victory. Hulme was close behind Hill, but when his McLaren lost second gear, he needed to back off and the Englishman cruised home. Beltoise recovered from his mechanical troubles and recorded the fastest lap of the race.

== Classification ==
=== Qualifying ===
Pos	No	Driver	Constructor	Time	Gap
1	19	(New Zealand) Chris Amon	Ferrari	1:27.9	—
2	9	(Mexico) Pedro Rodríguez	BRM	1:28.1	+0.2
3	1	(New Zealand) Denny Hulme	McLaren-Ford	1:28.3	+0.4
4	2	(New Zealand) Bruce McLaren	McLaren-Ford	1:28.3	+0.4
5	6	(France) Jean-Pierre Beltoise	Matra-Ford	1:28.3	+0.4
6	10	(United Kingdom) Graham Hill	Lotus-Ford	1:28.4	+0.5
7	7	(United Kingdom) John Surtees	Honda	1:28.8	+0.9
8	21	(Belgium) Jacky Ickx	Ferrari	1:29.6	+1.7
9	4	(Austria) Jochen Rindt	Brabham-Repco	1:29.7	+1.8
10	16	(Switzerland) Jo Siffert	Lotus-Ford	1:29.7	+1.8
11	5	(United Kingdom) Piers Courage	BRM	1:29.9	+2.0
12	15	(Italy) Ludovico Scarfiotti	Cooper-BRM	1:30.8	+2.9
13	14	(United Kingdom) Brian Redman	Cooper-BRM	1:31.0	+3.1
14	3	(Australia) Jack Brabham	Brabham-Repco	1:44.2	+16.3

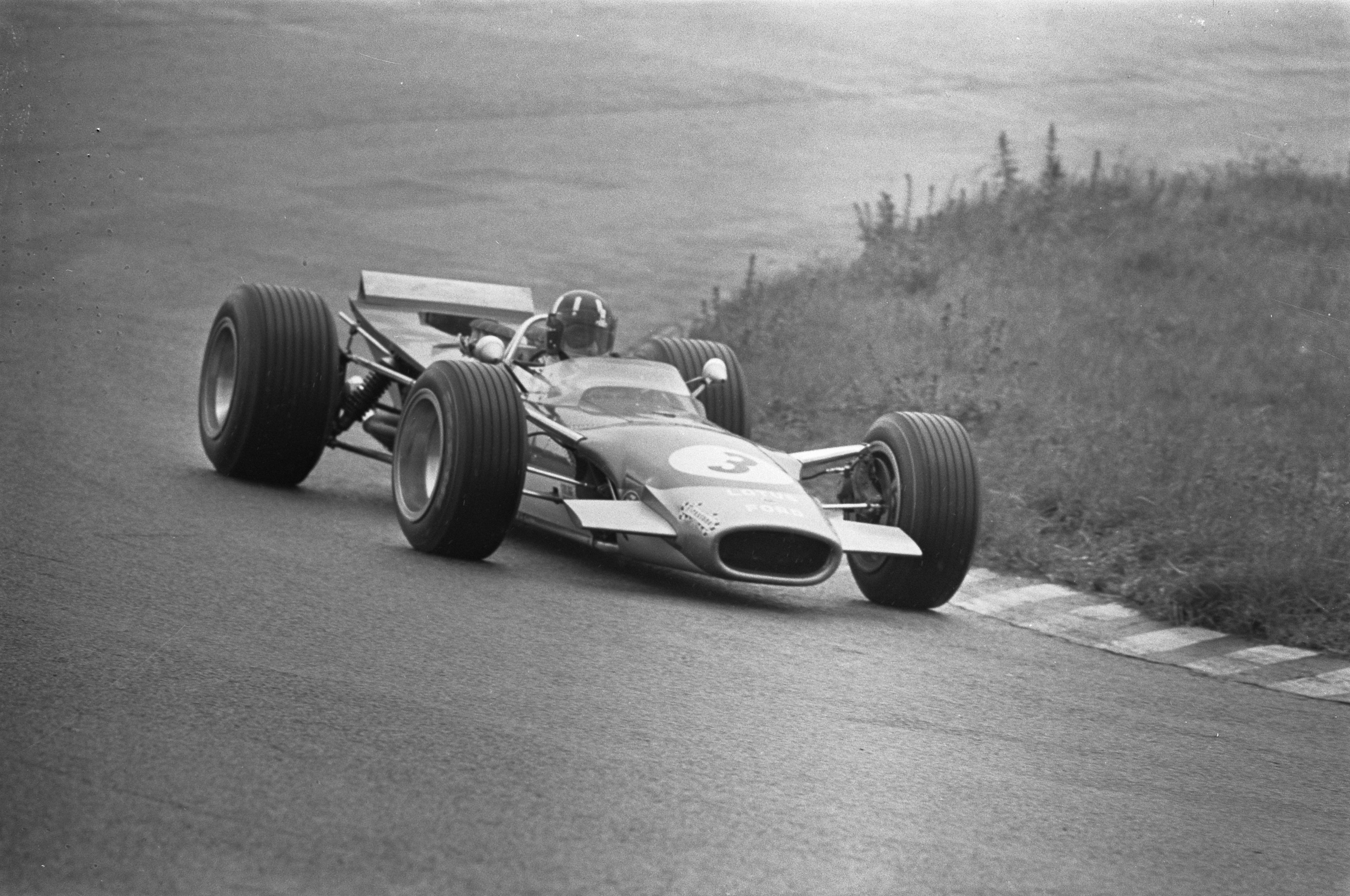
Hill (pictured at the Dutch Grand Prix) won his first race in two-and-a-half years

=== Race ===
Pos	No	Driver	Constructor	Laps	Time/Retired	Grid	Points
1	10	(United Kingdom) Graham Hill	Lotus-Ford	90	2:15:20.1	6	9
2	1	(New Zealand) Denny Hulme	McLaren-Ford	90	+ 15.9	3	6
3	14	(United Kingdom) Brian Redman	Cooper-BRM	89	+ 1 Lap	13	4
4	15	(Italy) Ludovico Scarfiotti	Cooper-BRM	89	+ 1 Lap	12	3
5	6	(France) Jean-Pierre Beltoise	Matra-Ford	81	+ 9 Laps	5	2
Ret	2	(New Zealand) Bruce McLaren	McLaren-Ford	77	Oil Leak	4	
Ret	7	(United Kingdom) John Surtees	Honda	74	Gearbox	7	
Ret	16	(Switzerland) Jo Siffert	Lotus-Ford	62	Transmission	10	
Ret	19	(New Zealand) Chris Amon	Ferrari	57	Fuel Pump	1	
Ret	5	(United Kingdom) Piers Courage	BRM	52	Fuel Pump	11	
Ret	9	(Mexico) Pedro Rodríguez	BRM	27	Accident	2	
Ret	21	(Belgium) Jacky Ickx	Ferrari	13	Ignition	8	
Ret	4	(Austria) Jochen Rindt	Brabham-Repco	10	Oil Pressure	9	
DNS	3	(Australia) Jack Brabham	Brabham-Repco		Engine		

== Notes ==
- This was the first of many podiums for the McLaren team.

== Championship standings after the race ==
Drivers' Championship standings

	Pos	Driver	Points
1	1	(United Kingdom) Graham Hill	15
1	2	(United Kingdom) Jim Clark	9
2	3	(New Zealand) Denny Hulme	8
1	4	(Austria) Jochen Rindt	4
6	5	(United Kingdom) Brian Redman	4

Constructors' Championship standings

	Pos	Constructor	Points
	1	(United Kingdom) Lotus-Ford	18
12	2	(United Kingdom) McLaren-Ford	6
1	3	(United Kingdom) Brabham-Repco	4
5	4	(United Kingdom) Cooper-BRM	4
2	5	(Italy) Ferrari	3

- Note: Only the top five positions are included for both sets of standings.

Previous race: 1968 South African Grand Prix	FIA Formula One World Championship; 1968 season	Next race: 1968 Monaco Grand Prix
Previous race: 1967 Spanish Grand Prix	Spanish Grand Prix	Next race: 1969 Spanish Grand Prix
