= Matra MS10 =

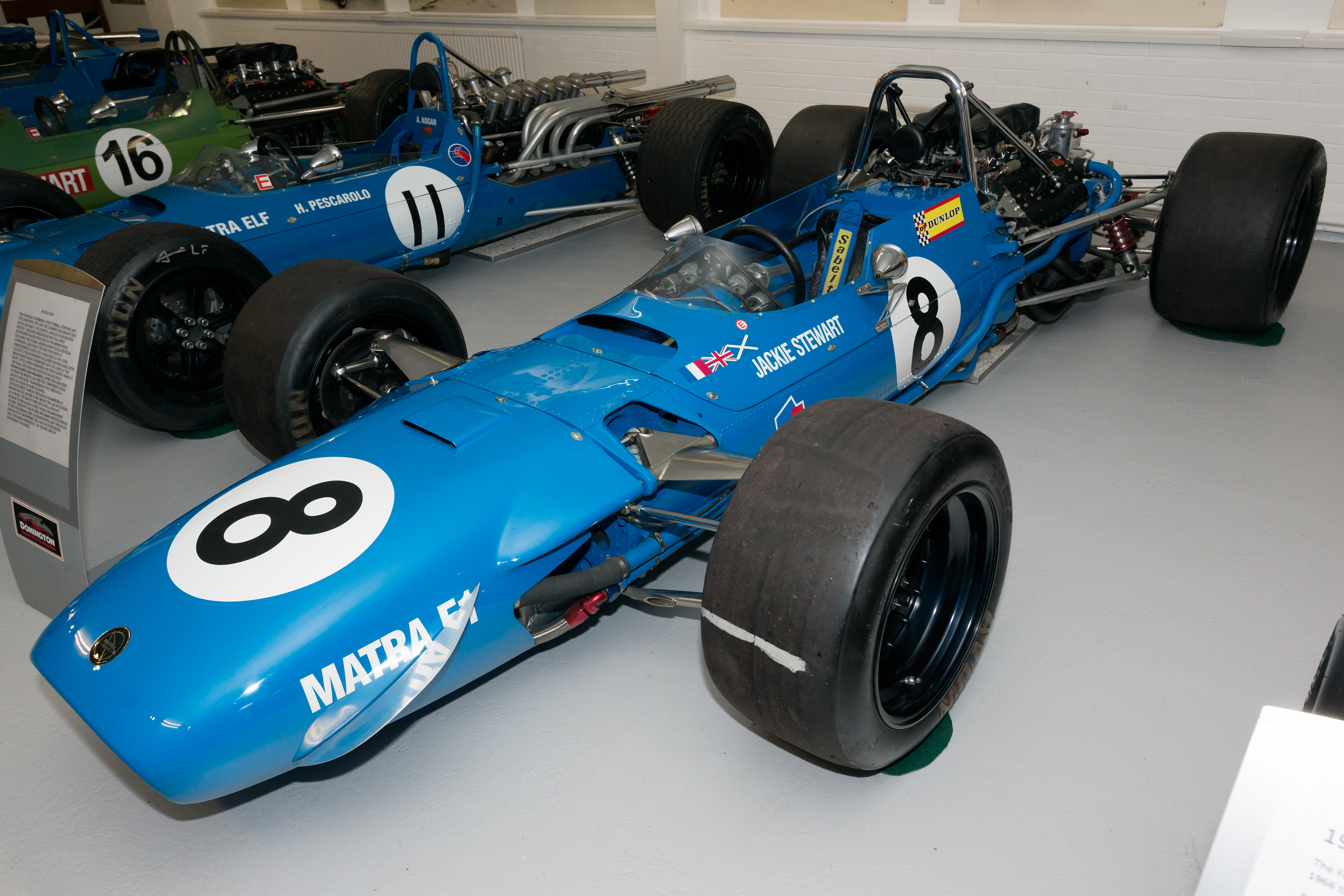
- Stewart's MS10 from the 1968 Dutch Grand Prix at Donington
- Category: Formula One
- Constructor: Matra
- Designer: Bernard Boyer
- Predecessor: MS9
- Successor: MS80

Technical specifications
- Chassis: Aluminium monocoque
- Engine: Ford Cosworth DFV 2,993 cc (182.6 cu in) V8 NA mid-engined
- Transmission: Hewland DG300 5 speed
- Weight: 540 kg (1,190.5 lb)
- Fuel: Elf
- Tyres: Dunlop

Competition history
- Notable entrants: Matra International
- Notable drivers: (United Kingdom) Jackie Stewart (France) Jean-Pierre Beltoise (France) Johnny Servoz-Gavin
- Debut: 1968 Spanish Grand Prix
Races	Wins	Podiums	Poles	F/Laps
12	4	6	0	4
- Constructors' Championships: 1 (1969)^{1}
- Drivers' Championships: 1 (Jackie Stewart, 1969)^{1}
- Unless otherwise stated, all data refer to Formula One World Championship Grands Prix only.

The Matra MS10 is a Formula One car entered by the Matra International team during the 1968 Formula One season. It, along with its V12-powered sibling MS11, was Matra's first purpose-built F1 car and won three races in 1968, taking Jackie Stewart to second place in the Drivers' Championship and Matra International to third place in the Constructors' Championship.

== Concept ==
Following its success in Formula 2, Matra had developed a F1 car intended to be powered by their own V12 engine. However, Ken Tyrrell, who was running the Formula 2 team, was impressed by the Cosworth DFV's performance in the 1967 season, and persuaded Matra to build a car to take this engine. In the end, Matra Sports would run the V12-engined MS11 as a works entry, and Tyrrell would run the V8-engined MS10 under the Matra International banner.

The car's most innovative feature was the use of aviation-inspired structural fuel tanks. These allowed the chassis to be around 15 kg lighter, while still being stronger than its competitors. The FIA considered the technology to be unsafe and decided to ban it for 1970, insisting on rubber bag-tanks.

== Racing history ==
Jackie Stewart had raced for Tyrrell's Formula 2 Matra team and signed to race for them in Formula 1 for 1968, having spent two fruitless years with BRM. However at the first event in 1968, the South African Grand Prix, he raced the interim MS9, but after qualifying an impressive third, he retired due to engine failure. Stewart then injured his wrist in a F2 race at Jarama, so at the Spanish Grand Prix Jean-Pierre Beltoise debuted the car instead, setting the fastest lap and finishing in fifth place. Beltoise then switched to the works MS11 and Johnny Servoz-Gavin raced the car at the Monaco Grand Prix, before a recovered Stewart took over for the rest of the season. As the season progressed the team experimented with fitting aerofoil 'wings' to the car. At the Italian Grand Prix and the United States Grand Prix for example, Stewart raced the MS10 with a high suspension-mounted wing, the same kind that was outlawed the following season after both Lotus drivers suffered near-fatal accidents at the Spanish Grand Prix. At the 1969 South African Grand Prix the car was even raced with two high wings, one over the front and one over the rear suspension. At other races the MS10 was raced with a lower wing, such as during Stewart's dominant win at the German Grand Prix. A second car was built and raced by Servoz-Gavin in the latter part of the season. By the end of the year Stewart had won three World Championship races and the non-championship International Gold Cup, and finished second in the World Championship. Matra International were third in the Constructor's Championship. After racing, and winning, once more in South Africa at the season opener to the 1969 season, and a third place at the BRDC International Trophy, the car was replaced by the championship-winning Matra MS80.

== Racing record ==
=== Complete Formula One World Championship results ===
(key) (results in bold indicate pole position; results in italics indicate fastest lap)

Year	Entrant	Engine	Tyres	Drivers	1	2	3	4	5	6	7	8	9	10	11	12	Points	WCC
1968	Matra International	Ford Cosworth DFV; 3.0 V8	D		RSA	ESP	MON	BEL	NED	FRA	GBR	GER	ITA	CAN	USA	MEX	**45**^{1}	3rd
1968	Matra International	Ford Cosworth DFV; 3.0 V8	D	Jackie Stewart				4	1	3	6	1	Ret	6	1	7	**45**^{1}	3rd
1968	Matra International	Ford Cosworth DFV; 3.0 V8	D	Jean-Pierre Beltoise		5											**45**^{1}	3rd
1968	Matra International	Ford Cosworth DFV; 3.0 V8	D	Johnny Servoz-Gavin			Ret						2	Ret		Ret	**45**^{1}	3rd
1969	Matra International	Ford Cosworth DFV; 3.0 V8	D		RSA	ESP	MON	NED	FRA	GBR	GER	ITA	CAN	USA	MEX		**66**^{2}	1st
1969	Matra International	Ford Cosworth DFV; 3.0 V8	D	Jackie Stewart	1												**66**^{2}	1st
1969	Matra International	Ford Cosworth DFV; 3.0 V8	D	Jean-Pierre Beltoise	6												**66**^{2}	1st

^{1} In the 1968 Constructors' Championship, Matra-Ford finished 3rd (45 points), Matra(-Matra) finished 9th (8 points).
^{2} In 1969, 9 points were scored using the MS10, the remaining points were scored using the MS80.

=== Non-Championship results ===
(key) (results in bold indicate pole position; results in italics indicate fastest lap)

Year	Entrant	Engine	Tyres	Drivers	1	2	3	4
1968	Matra International	Ford Cosworth DFV; 3.0 V8	**D**		ROC	INT	OUL	
1968	Matra International	Ford Cosworth DFV; 3.0 V8	**D**	Jackie Stewart	6		1	
1969	Matra International	Ford Cosworth DFV; 3.0 V8	**D**		ROC	INT	MAD	OUL
1969	Matra International	Ford Cosworth DFV; 3.0 V8	**D**	Jackie Stewart		**3**^{1}		

^{1} Stewart qualified for pole in the MS80 but raced in the MS10.

Gallery
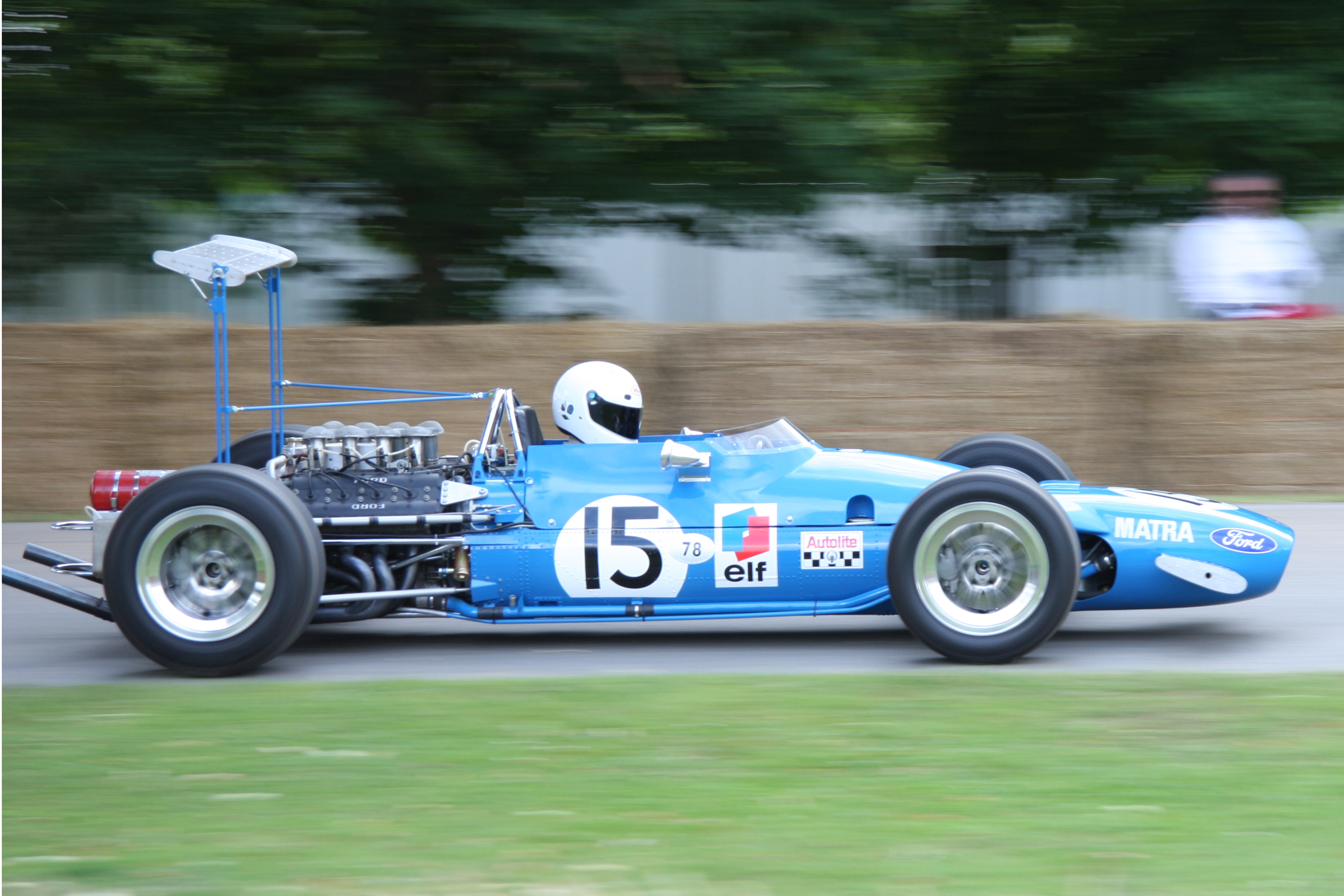
MS10 with high wing at the 2008 Goodwood Festival of Speed

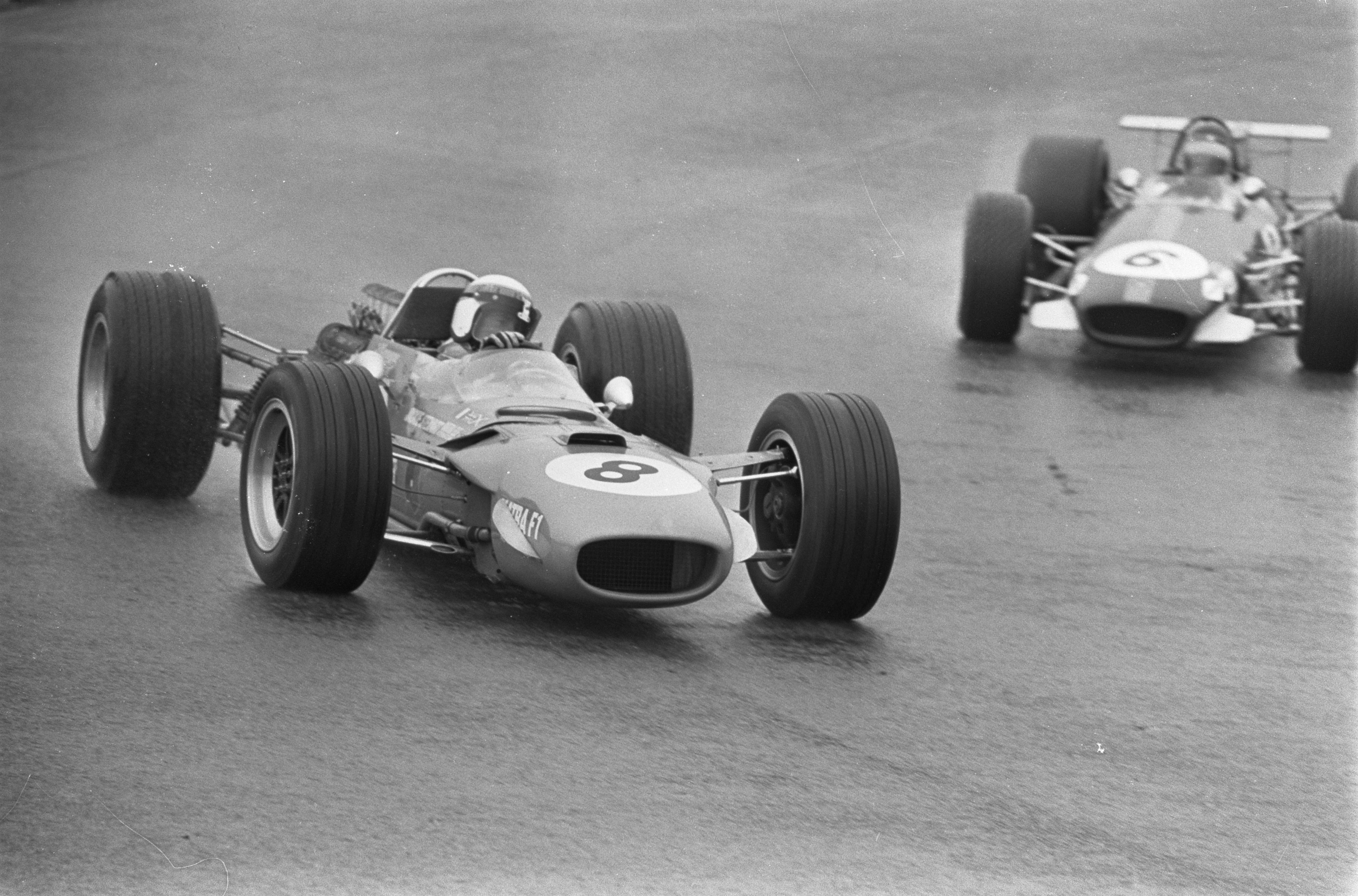
Jackie Stewart being chased by Jochen Rindt at the 1968 Dutch Grand Prix.

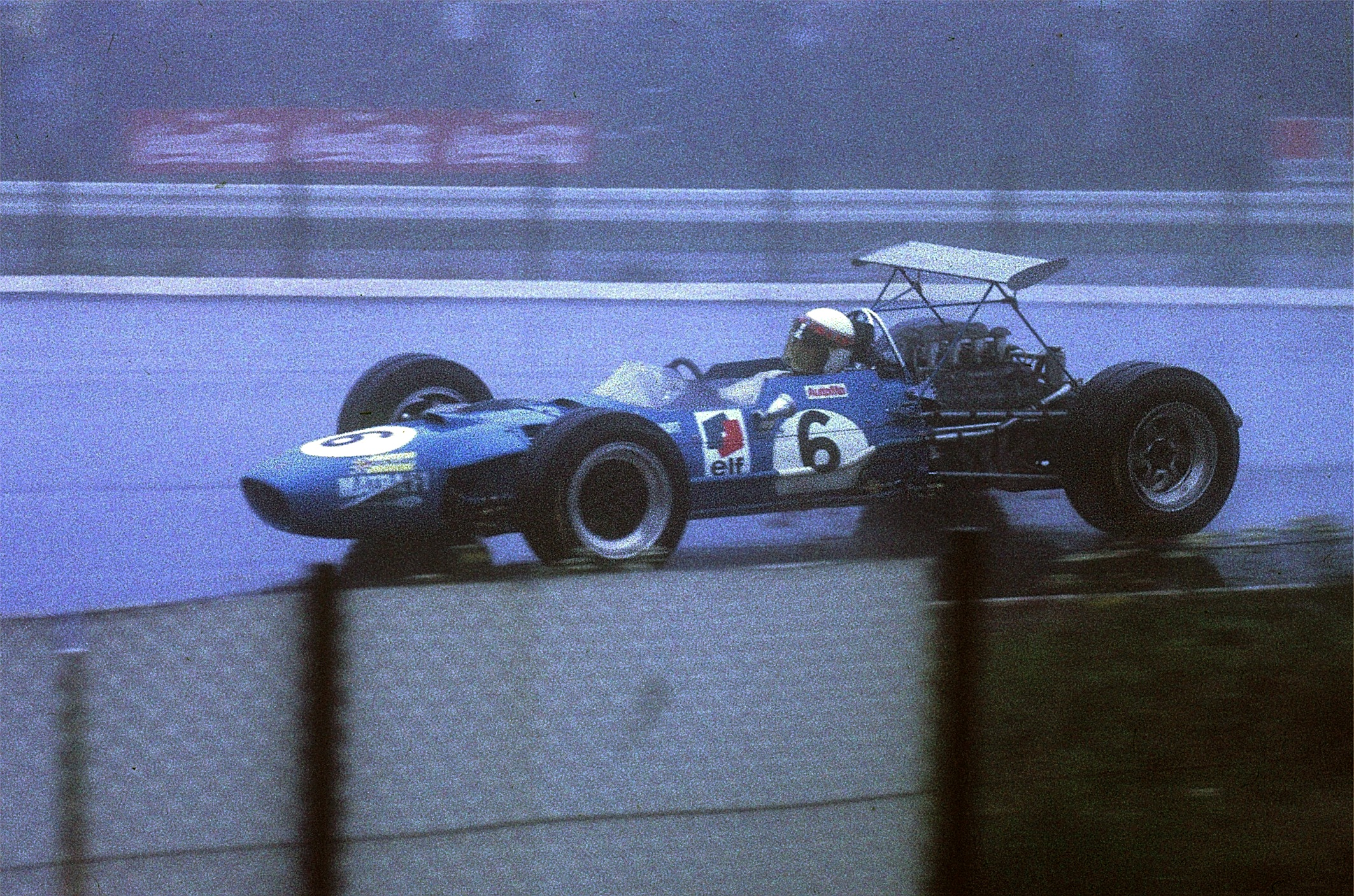
Jackie Stewart at the 1968 German Grand Prix. Note the low wing.

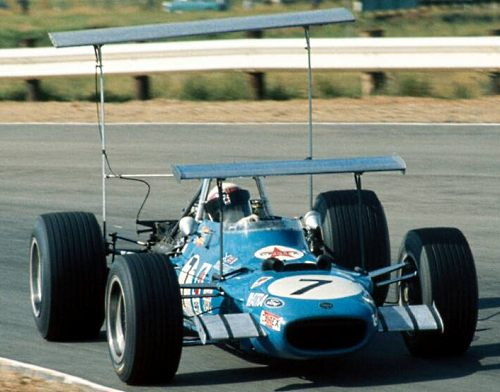
Jackie Stewart driving the MS10 at the 1969 South African Grand Prix with two wings (likely during qualifying)

== Notes ==
^1 – The MS10 was used in just one race of the 1969 season, before it was replaced by the MS80.
