= Factory-backed =

Term in motorsports

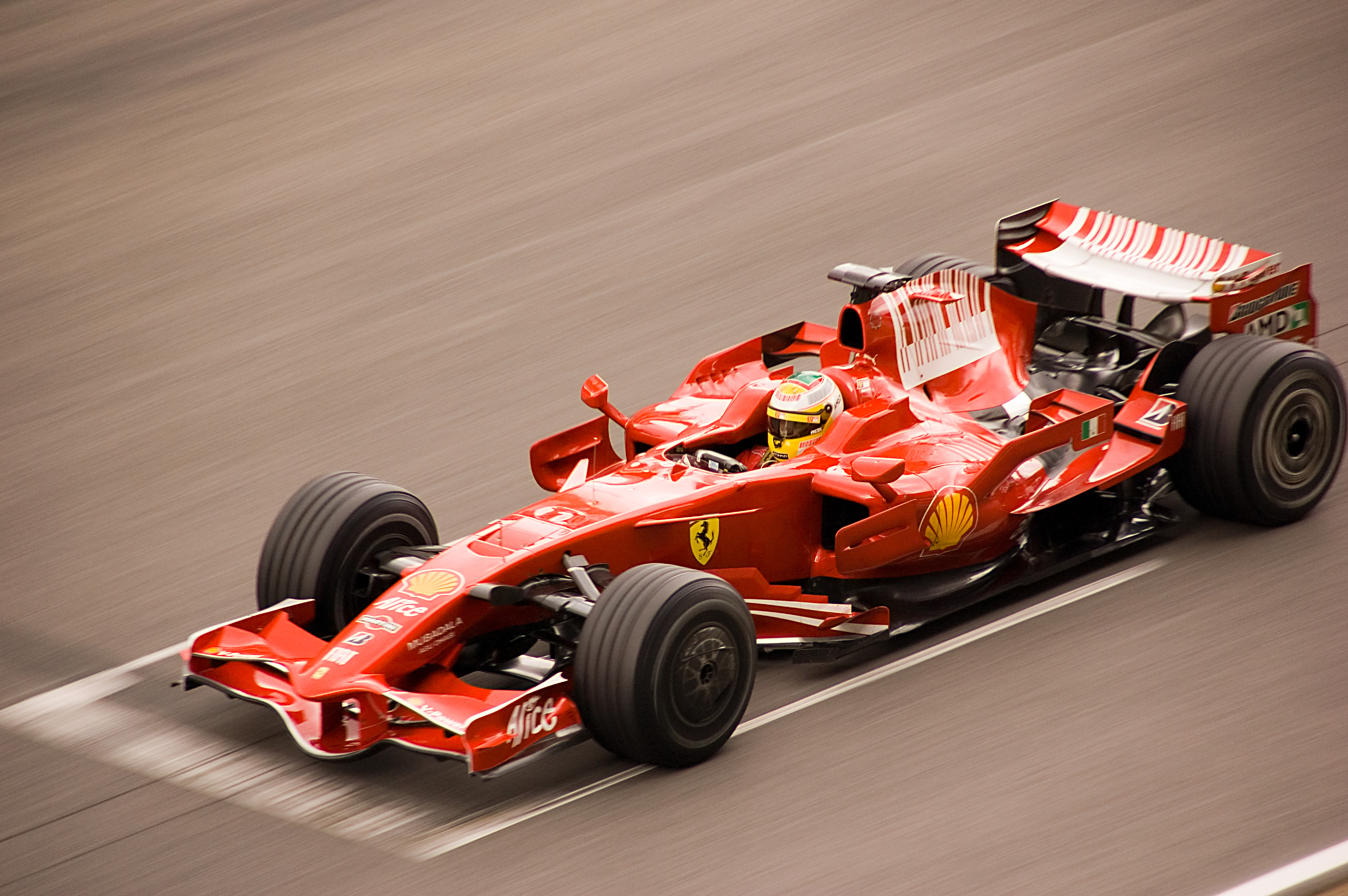
Scuderia Ferrari are the most successful factory team in Formula One.

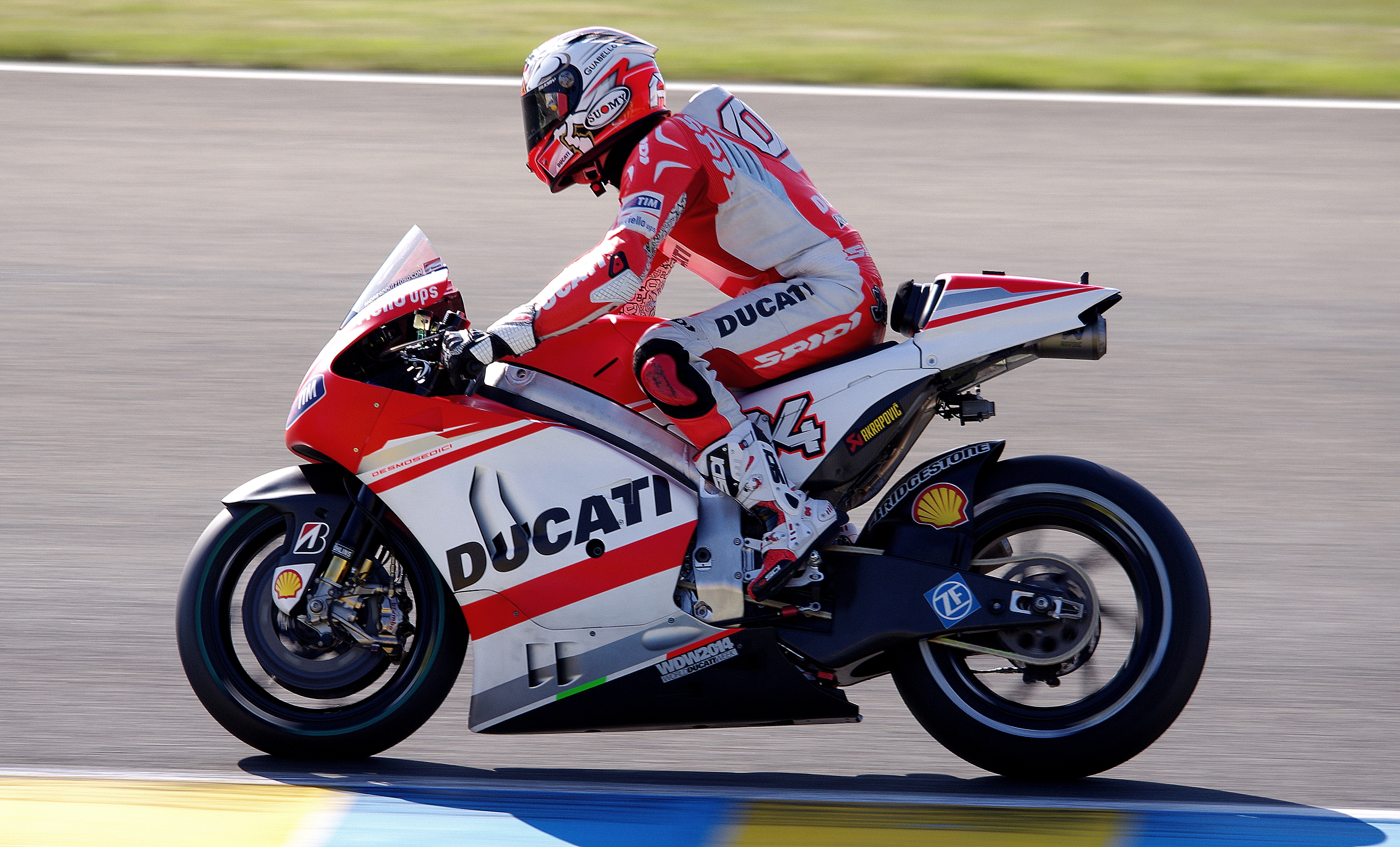
In the 2015 MotoGP season, the Ducati factory team used the 2015 version of their bike, while customer teams Avintia and Pramac both used the 2014 version.

In motorsports, a factory-backed racing team or driver is one sponsored by a vehicle manufacturer in official competitions.

== Definition ==
As motorsport competition is an expensive endeavor, some degree of factory support is desired and often necessary for success.

The lowest form of factory backing comes in the form of contingency awards, based upon performance, which help to defray the cost of competing.

Full factory backing can be often seen in the highest forms of international competition, with major motorsport operations often receiving hundreds of millions of euros to represent a particular manufacturer.

The advantage to this is drivers can get access to expensive prototype parts provided by the company that are not yet available to customers and in the event of their car being too badly damaged to compete, a back-up car will be available to them.

== Practice ==
=== Grand Prix racing ===
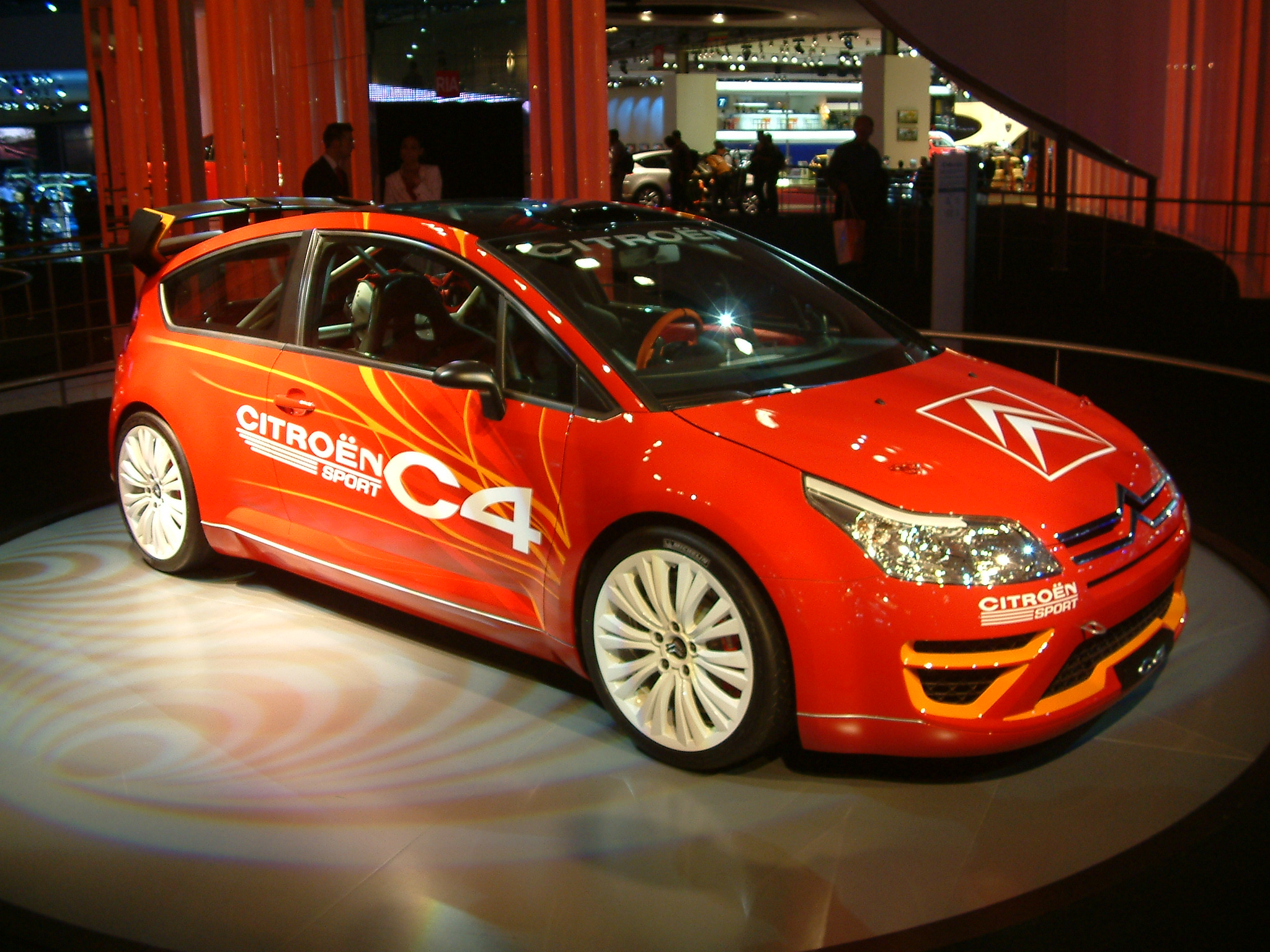
The Citroën World Rally Team have won 8 Constructors' championships.

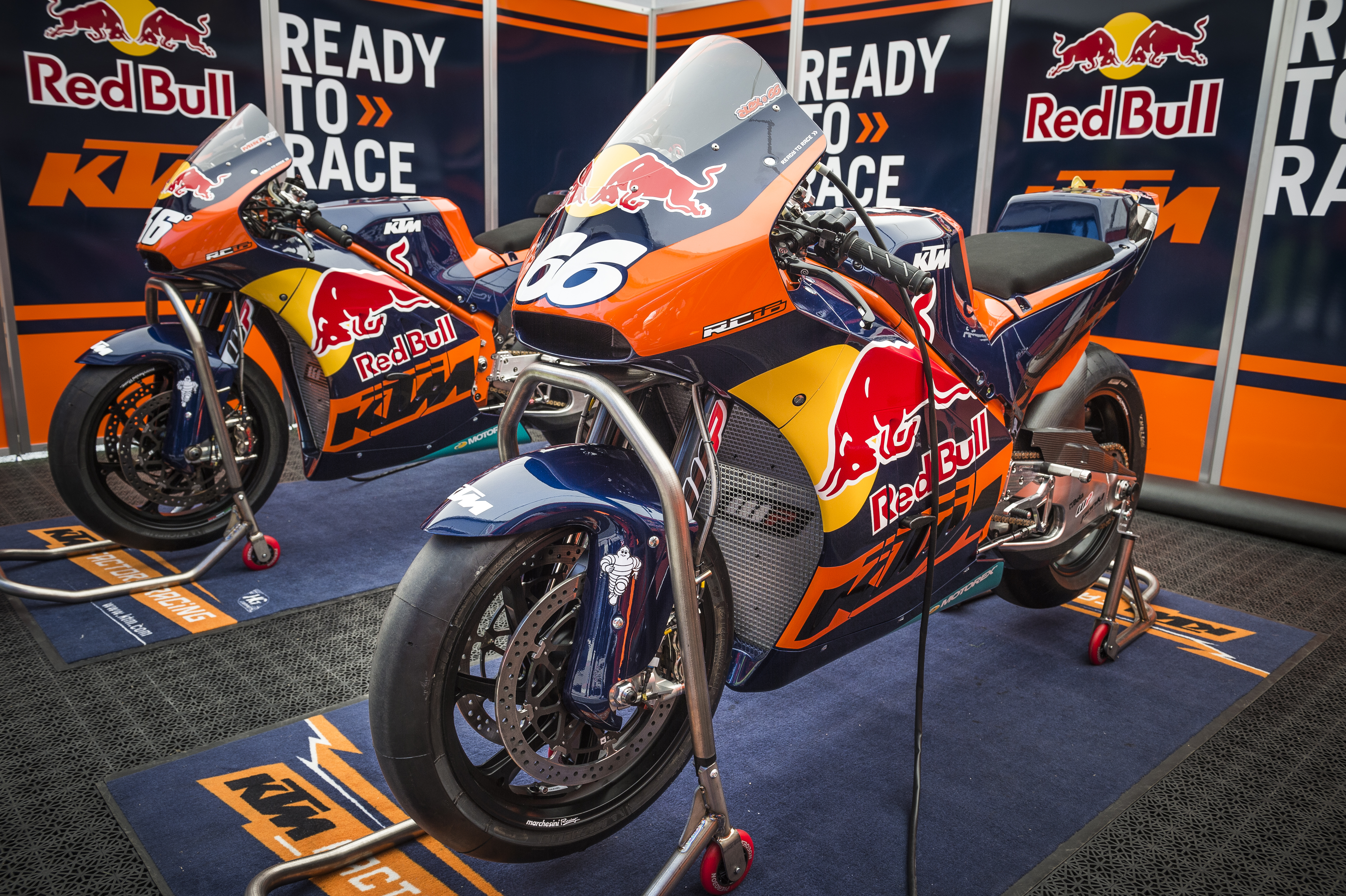
Red Bull KTM Factory Racing, a joint factory-backed team of KTM and company team of Red Bull in Grand Prix motorcycle racing.

In Grand Prix motor racing, the most well-established or traditional definition of a works team or factory-backed team is a manufacturer that builds its own car or motorbike including the engine. In a broader sense, it can also be any team that is financed and run by a manufacturer or other business, institution, or organization.

Scuderia Ferrari is a notable example of a works team or factory-backed team in Formula One.

Several factory-backed motorcycle racing and World Rally Championship teams exist.

The creation of the World Sportscar Championship in 1953 changed motorsport deeply and was marked by the establishment of teams like Ferrari, Aston Martin, Mercedes-Benz, and Jaguar, which began to enter multiple factory backed cars or works cars to compete.

Red Bull GmbH entered Formula One in 2005 after creating its own company team Red Bull Racing, and in 2022 had started the development of comprehensive in-house capabilities in order to secure the production of its own powertrains by 2026.

=== Formula E ===
In the 2010s, many works teams, also known as factory-backed teams in the context of motorsport, entered the newly created Formula E open-wheel electric motorsport series.

=== One-make series ===
One-make series can be backed by the factory, notably Ferrari Challenge and Porsche Supercup, purely to allow themselves sell their competition specials of their models to customers and to organize series.

These series commonly offer prize money and even sometimes a factory drive in an upper-level series.

=== Lower level racing ===
In lower level racing, support from dealerships and importers may also be referred to as factory backing.

=== Drifting ===
In drifting, where factory backed teams are few and far between (for example, Mopar and Pontiac of Formula D), works team/drivers are those backed by large or highly established tuning companies, as opposed to those entered by the drivers themselves or smaller and less well-off tuning companies.

== See also ==
- Privateer (motorsport)
- Satellite team
