= 1968 Monaco Grand Prix =

Coordinates: 43°44′4.74″N 7°25′16.8″E

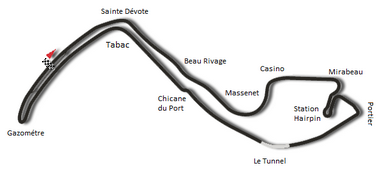

Race details
- Date: 26 May 1968
- Official name: XXVI Grand Prix Automobile de Monaco
- Location: Circuit de Monaco, Monte Carlo, Monaco
- Course: Street Circuit
- Course length: 3.145 km (1.954 miles)
- Distance: 80 laps, 251.600 km (156.337 miles)
- Weather: Sunny, Mild, Dry

Pole position
Driver	(United Kingdom) Graham Hill	Lotus-Ford
- Time: 1:28.2

Fastest lap
Driver	(United Kingdom) Richard Attwood	BRM
- Time: 1:28.1 on lap 80

Podium
First	(United Kingdom) Graham Hill	Lotus-Ford
Second	(United Kingdom) Richard Attwood	BRM
Third	(Belgium) Lucien Bianchi	Cooper-BRM

The 1968 Monaco Grand Prix was a Formula One motor race held at the Monte Carlo Circuit on 26 May 1968. It was race 3 of 12 in both the 1968 World Championship of Drivers and the 1968 International Cup for Formula One Manufacturers. The race was won by Lotus driver Graham Hill, who started from pole position. Richard Attwood, driving for BRM, gained second place and fastest lap, while Lucien Bianchi finished in third position in a Cooper, in what was to be these two drivers' only podium finishes.

== Report ==
=== Background ===
Following the fatal accident of Lorenzo Bandini a year earlier, the track was altered with the harbour chicane being tightened and the race shortened by 20 laps. Ferrari still chose not to attend the race since they felt the safety measures to be insufficient. While Graham Hill stated Lotus were still "in despair" over the losses of Jim Clark and Mike Spence, the team nevertheless introduced their new Lotus 49B for the race. This race was the first race where wings were used on a Formula One car since the B specifications introduced a wedge shape and a front wing. 1968 would prove to be the season in which wings became a common place on Formula One cars. Jackie Stewart was still sidelined by his wrist injury and was replaced by Johnny Servoz-Gavin, after Ferrari refused to allow Chris Amon to enter for the Matra International team.

Richard Attwood was promoted from Reg Parnell Racing to the BRM works team after Mike Spence's replacement, Chris Irwin, suffered career-ending head injuries at the 1000km Nürburgring endurance race. Brian Redman, who had produced a solid performance in the previous race by finishing third, was racing at the 1000 km Spa and was therefore replaced at Cooper by Lucien Bianchi. With the Indianapolis 500 taking place just five days after the grand prix, McLaren's Denny Hulme was busy flying back and forth to attend both the Monaco Grand Prix as well as qualifying at Indianapolis.

With France in political unrest, the race organizers borrowed power generators from a local film production company in order to ensure that the tunnel would stay illuminated even in case of a power outage.

The race length was reduced from the traditional 100 laps (315 kilometres (196 mi)) to 80 laps (250 kilometres (160 mi)) and marked the first time a Grand Prix was shorter than 300 km in scheduled distance.

This was the Formula One World Championship debut for Matra as an engine supplier.

=== Qualifying ===
During qualifying, Graham Hill, a previous three time-winner at Monaco, set the pace and secured pole position 0.6 seconds ahead of the strong Johnny Servoz-Gavin. The Frenchman proved once more the Matra MS10, which had recorded the fastest lap for Jean-Pierre Beltoise in Spain, was highly competitive.

=== Race ===
Johnny Servoz-Gavin took the lead from Hill at the start, while Bruce McLaren took out the other Lotus of Jackie Oliver at the chicane on the first lap. Servoz-Gavin was struck by bad luck on lap 3 when he suffered a drive shaft failure and crashed. This set the tone for the rest of the race, when after a series of accidents and mechanical failures, only five cars finished the race, with everyone from 3rd-place finishing at least four laps down on eventual winner Hill, who cemented his reputation as "Mr. Monaco" by taking his fourth win in the principality. It was however a close finish, with BRM replacement Richard Attwood surprising by finishing just 2 seconds behind the Englishman. Even though Hill broke the Monaco lap record three times during the race, it was Attwood who ultimately recorded fastest lap, the only one of his career. This would also be his one and only podium finish at a Formula One race, just as for Belgian Lucien Bianchi, who finished third. This was the 50th podium finish for Lotus.

Disaster would strike Formula One again just two weeks later as fourth-placed Ludovico Scarfiotti was killed during the Rossfeld hillclimb event.

== Classification ==
=== Qualifying ===
Pos	No	Driver	Constructor	Time	Gap
1	9	(United Kingdom) Graham Hill	Lotus-Ford	1:28.2	—
2	11	(France) Johnny Servoz-Gavin	Matra-Ford	1:28.8	+0.6
3	17	(Switzerland) Jo Siffert	Lotus-Ford	1:28.8	+0.6
4	8	(United Kingdom) John Surtees	Honda	1:29.1	+0.9
5	3	(Austria) Jochen Rindt	Brabham-Repco	1:29.2	+1.0
6	15	(United Kingdom) Richard Attwood	BRM	1:29.6	+1.4
7	14	(New Zealand) Bruce McLaren	McLaren-Ford	1:29.6	+1.4
8	1	(France) Jean-Pierre Beltoise	Matra	1:29.7	+1.5
9	4	(Mexico) Pedro Rodríguez	BRM	1:30.4	+2.2
10	12	(New Zealand) Denny Hulme	McLaren-Ford	1:30.4	+2.2
11	16	(United Kingdom) Piers Courage	BRM	1:30.6	+2.4
12	2	(Australia) Jack Brabham	Brabham-Repco	1:31.2	+3.0
13	10	(United Kingdom) Jackie Oliver	Lotus-Ford	1:31.7	+3.5
14	7	(Belgium) Lucien Bianchi	Cooper-BRM	1:31.9	+3.7
15	6	(Italy) Ludovico Scarfiotti	Cooper-BRM	1:32.9	+4.7
16	19	(United States) Dan Gurney	Eagle-Weslake	1:32.9	+4.7
DNQ	18	(Sweden) Jo Bonnier	McLaren-BRM	1:32.1	+3.9
DNQ	21	(Switzerland) Silvio Moser	Brabham-Repco	1:32.4	+4.2

=== Race ===
Pos	No	Driver	Constructor	Laps	Time/Retired	Grid	Points
1	9	(United Kingdom) Graham Hill	Lotus-Ford	80	2:00:32.3	1	9
2	15	(United Kingdom) Richard Attwood	BRM	80	+ 2.2	6	6
3	7	(Belgium) Lucien Bianchi	Cooper-BRM	76	+ 4 Laps	14	4
4	6	(Italy) Ludovico Scarfiotti	Cooper-BRM	76	+ 4 Laps	15	3
5	12	(New Zealand) Denny Hulme	McLaren-Ford	73	+ 7 Laps	10	2
Ret	8	(United Kingdom) John Surtees	Honda	16	Gearbox	4	
Ret	4	(Mexico) Pedro Rodríguez	BRM	16	Accident	9	
Ret	16	(United Kingdom) Piers Courage	BRM	12	Chassis	11	
Ret	17	(Switzerland) Jo Siffert	Lotus-Ford	11	Differential	3	
Ret	1	(France) Jean-Pierre Beltoise	Matra	11	Accident	8	
Ret	19	(United States) Dan Gurney	Eagle-Weslake	9	Engine	16	
Ret	3	(Austria) Jochen Rindt	Brabham-Repco	8	Accident	5	
Ret	2	(Australia) Jack Brabham	Brabham-Repco	7	Suspension	12	
Ret	11	(France) Johnny Servoz-Gavin	Matra-Ford	3	Halfshaft	2	
Ret	14	(New Zealand) Bruce McLaren	McLaren-Ford	0	Accident	7	
Ret	10	(United Kingdom) Jackie Oliver	Lotus-Ford	0	Accident	13	

== Notes ==
- This was the 100th participation of an Australian driver in a Formula One World Championship Grand Prix. In those 100 races, Australian drivers had won 13 Grands Prix, achieved 25 podium finishes, 10 pole positions, 7 fastest laps, 3 Grand Slams and 3 World Championships.
- This was the Formula One World Championship debut for Matra as an engine supplier.
- This was the fourth win of a Monaco Grand Prix for Graham Hill, setting a new record and breaking the old record set by Stirling Moss at the 1961 Monaco Grand Prix.
- This was the 100th race for BRM.
- This race marked the 50th podium finish for Lotus.

== Championship standings after the race ==
Drivers' Championship standings

	Pos	Driver	Points
	1	(United Kingdom) Graham Hill	24
1	2	(New Zealand) Denny Hulme	10
1	3	(United Kingdom) Jim Clark	9
22	4	(United Kingdom) Richard Attwood	6
2	5	(Italy) Ludovico Scarfiotti	6

Constructors' Championship standings

	Pos	Constructor	Points
	1	(United Kingdom) Lotus-Ford	27
	2	(United Kingdom) McLaren-Ford	8
1	3	(United Kingdom) Cooper-BRM	8
7	4	(United Kingdom) BRM	6
2	5	(United Kingdom) Brabham-Repco	4

- Note: Only the top five positions are included for both sets of standings.

Previous race: 1968 Spanish Grand Prix	FIA Formula One World Championship; 1968 season	Next race: 1968 Belgian Grand Prix
Previous race: 1967 Monaco Grand Prix	Monaco Grand Prix	Next race: 1969 Monaco Grand Prix
