= 1968 German Grand Prix =

Race details
- Date: 4 August 1968
- Official name: XXX Großer Preis von Deutschland; XXVIII Grand Prix d'Europe
- Location: Nürburgring, Nürburg, West Germany
- Course: Permanent racing facility
- Course length: 22.835 km (14.189 miles)
- Distance: 14 laps, 319.690 km (198.646 miles)
- Weather: Hazy, Wet

Pole position
Driver	(Belgium) Jacky Ickx	Ferrari
- Time: 9:04.0

Fastest lap
Driver	(United Kingdom) Jackie Stewart	Matra-Ford
- Time: 9:36.0 on lap 8

Podium
First	(United Kingdom) Jackie Stewart	Matra-Ford
Second	(United Kingdom) Graham Hill	Lotus-Ford
Third	(Austria) Jochen Rindt	Brabham-Repco

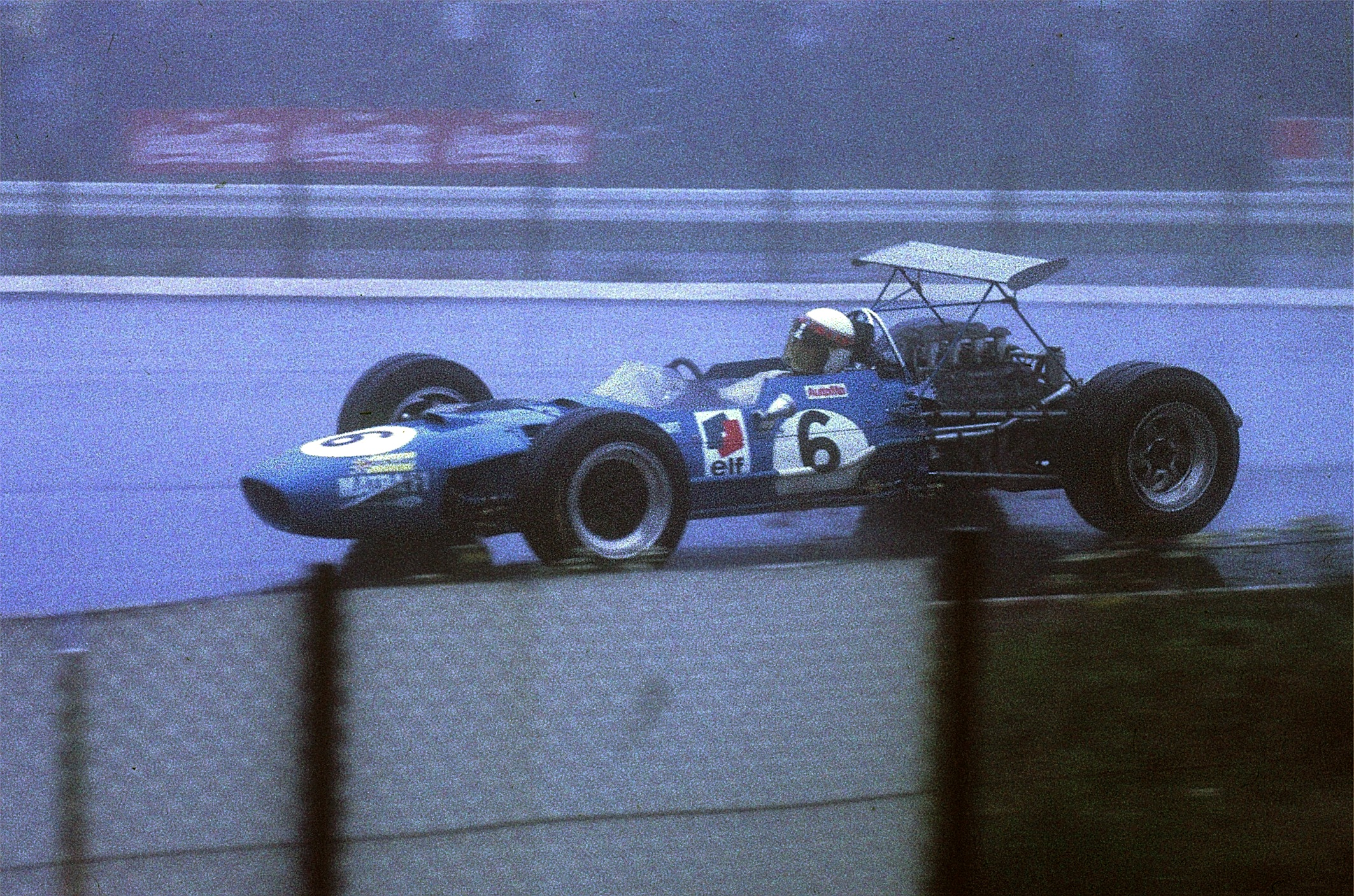
Winner Jackie Stewart in a Matra MS10

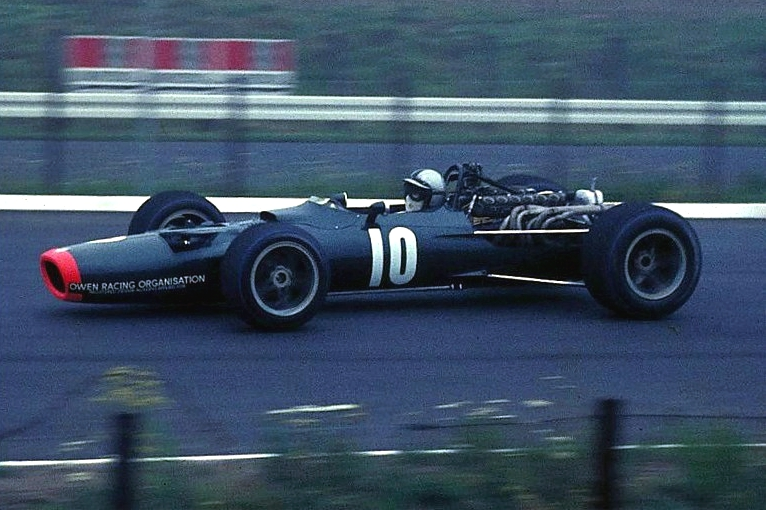
Pedro Rodriguez in a BRM P133

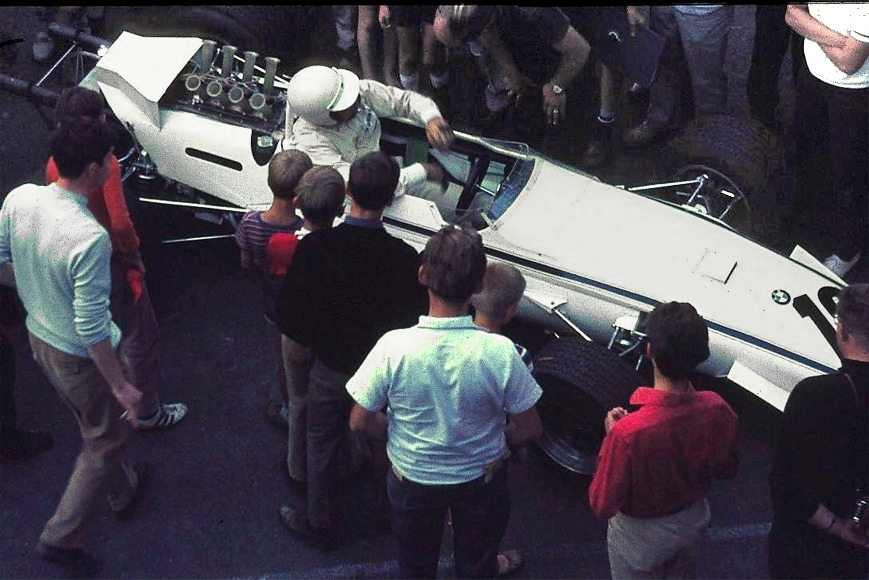
BMW's Formula Two car and driver Hubert Hahne during practice

The 1968 German Grand Prix was a Formula One motor race held at the Nürburgring on 4 August 1968. It was race 8 of 12 in both the 1968 World Championship of Drivers and the 1968 International Cup for Formula One Manufacturers. The race was held in extremely wet and foggy conditions, and British driver Jackie Stewart, racing with a broken wrist, won the race by a margin of four minutes in what is widely considered to be one of the greatest victories in the history of Formula One.

The race is also notable for Dan Gurney's choice of a full-face helmet, making him the first driver to do so in Grand Prix racing.

== Report ==
=== Background ===
After Jo Siffert had surprisingly won the previous race at Brands Hatch, the paddock arrived at the Nürburgring almost unchanged. Equally unchanged was the weather: with rain over the entire weekend, this was to be the fifth wet race in a row. BMW entered a Lola-built Formula Two car driven by Hubert Hahne in order to evaluate their competitiveness in Formula One.

=== Practice and qualifying ===
On Saturday, conditions were so poor, with visibility down to mere ten yards, that the organizers scheduled an additional practice session for Sunday morning. Still many drivers slid off the track during the morning session. Eventually, Jacky Ickx took pole positions by a full 10 seconds from second placed Chris Amon, both in a Ferrari. Jackie Stewart in his Matra MS10 was down in sixth place on the grid. At the time, Ickx became the youngest person ever to sit on pole, a record beaten 14 years later when Andrea de Cesaris achieved pole position at the 1982 United States Grand Prix West.

=== Race ===
Even with the conditions treacherous, 200,000 spectators turned up for the race on Sunday afternoon. The race turned out to be a one-man show by Scotsman Jackie Stewart. While Graham Hill took the lead at the start, by the end of the first lap Stewart had moved into first place and built a nine-second lead. He put his superior Dunlop wet tires to great effect and by the end of lap 2, had extended his lead to 34 seconds. When the race ended after 14 laps, Stewart crossed the line more than 4 minutes in front of second placed Hill. The eventual World Champion had spun on lap 11, but was able to get out of the car, push it into the right direction and keep going before third-placed Jochen Rindt could catch up. Chris Amon had battled with Hill for 11 laps over second place, rarely having more than a second between the two, until Amon spun out of the race on the same lap as Hill did.

=== Reactions ===
Stewart described the race as a "teeth gritting effort" in his autobiography. About the first lap he wrote:

Visibility is so pathetically poor I can't even see Chris' car in front of me [...] I am simply driving into this great wall of spray. I pull out to pass him but the spray is dense and I'm driving blind.

— Jackie Stewart, Winning Is Not Enough

The race has been described as Stewart's best drive ever, with the Scot later confirming he felt the same way.

== Classification ==
=== Qualifying ===
Pos	No	Driver	Constructor	Time	Gap
1	9	(Belgium) Jacky Ickx	Ferrari	9:04.0	—
2	8	(New Zealand) Chris Amon	Ferrari	9:14.9	+10.9
3	5	(Austria) Jochen Rindt	Brabham-Repco	9:31.9	+27.9
4	3	(United Kingdom) Graham Hill	Lotus-Ford	9:46.0	+42.0
5	20	(United Kingdom) Vic Elford	Cooper-BRM	9:53.0	+49.0
6	6	(United Kingdom) Jackie Stewart	Matra-Ford	9:54.2	+50.2
7	7	(United Kingdom) John Surtees	Honda	9:57.8	+53.8
8	22	(United Kingdom) Piers Courage	BRM	10:00.1	+56.1
9	16	(Switzerland) Jo Siffert	Lotus-Ford	10:03.4	+59.4
10	14	(United States) Dan Gurney	Eagle-Weslake	10:13.9	+1:09.9
11	1	(New Zealand) Denny Hulme	McLaren-Ford	10:16.0	+1:12.0
12	12	(France) Jean-Pierre Beltoise	Matra	10:17.3	+1:13.3
13	21	(United Kingdom) Jackie Oliver	Lotus-Ford	10:18.7	+1:14.7
14	10	(Mexico) Pedro Rodríguez	BRM	10:19.7	+1:15.7
15	4	(Australia) Jack Brabham	Brabham-Repco	10:23.1	+1:19.1
16	2	(New Zealand) Bruce McLaren	McLaren-Ford	10:33.0	+1:29.0
17	17	(West Germany) Kurt Ahrens Jr.	Brabham-Repco	10:37.3	+1:33.3
18	18	(West Germany) Hubert Hahne	Lola-BMW	10:42.9	+1:38.9
19	19	(Belgium) Lucien Bianchi	Cooper-BRM	10:46.6	+1:42.6
20	11	(United Kingdom) Richard Attwood	BRM	10:48.2	+1:44.2
21	23	(Switzerland) Silvio Moser	Brabham-Repco		

=== Race ===
Pos	No	Driver	Constructor	Laps	Time/Retired	Grid	Points
1	6	(United Kingdom) Jackie Stewart	Matra-Ford	14	2:19:03.2	6	9
2	3	(United Kingdom) Graham Hill	Lotus-Ford	14	+ 4:03.2	4	6
3	5	(Austria) Jochen Rindt	Brabham-Repco	14	+ 4:09.4	3	4
4	9	(Belgium) Jacky Ickx	Ferrari	14	+ 5:55.2	1	3
5	4	(Australia) Jack Brabham	Brabham-Repco	14	+ 6:21.1	15	2
6	10	(Mexico) Pedro Rodríguez	BRM	14	+ 6:25.0	14	1
7	1	(New Zealand) Denny Hulme	McLaren-Ford	14	+ 6:31.0	11	
8	22	(United Kingdom) Piers Courage	BRM	14	+ 7:56.4	8	
9	14	(United States) Dan Gurney	Eagle-Weslake	14	+ 8:13.7	10	
10	18	(West Germany) Hubert Hahne	Lola-BMW	14	+ 10:11.4	18	
11	21	(United Kingdom) Jackie Oliver	Lotus-Ford	13	+ 1 Lap	13	
12	17	(West Germany) Kurt Ahrens Jr.	Brabham-Repco	13	+ 1 Lap	17	
13	2	(New Zealand) Bruce McLaren	McLaren-Ford	13	+ 1 Lap	16	
14	11	(United Kingdom) Richard Attwood	BRM	13	+ 1 Lap	20	
Ret	8	(New Zealand) Chris Amon	Ferrari	11	Accident	2	
Ret	12	(France) Jean-Pierre Beltoise	Matra	8	Accident	12	
Ret	16	(Switzerland) Jo Siffert	Lotus-Ford	6	Ignition	9	
Ret	19	(Belgium) Lucien Bianchi	Cooper-BRM	6	Fuel Leak	19	
Ret	7	(United Kingdom) John Surtees	Honda	3	Ignition	7	
Ret	20	(United Kingdom) Vic Elford	Cooper-BRM	0	Accident	5	
DNS	23	(Switzerland) Silvio Moser	Brabham-Repco		Oil Pump		
WD	15	(Sweden) Jo Bonnier	McLaren-BRM				

== Notes ==
- This was the 100th race for a Lotus. In those 100 races, the British constructor had won 33 Grands Prix, had achieved 52 podiums, 43 pole positions, 35 fastest laps, 12 Grand Slams and had won 2 Driver's and 2 Constructor's World Championships.

== Championship standings after the race ==
Drivers' Championship standings

	Pos	Driver	Points
	1	(United Kingdom) Graham Hill	30
1	2	(United Kingdom) Jackie Stewart	26
1	3	(Belgium) Jacky Ickx	23
	4	(New Zealand) Denny Hulme	15
	5	(Mexico) Pedro Rodríguez	11

Constructors' Championship standings

	Pos	Constructor	Points
	1	(United Kingdom) Lotus-Ford	44
2	2	(France) Matra-Ford	29
1	3	(Italy) Ferrari	28
1	4	(United Kingdom) McLaren-Ford	22
	5	(United Kingdom) BRM	18

- Note: Only the top five positions are included for both sets of standings.

Previous race: 1968 British Grand Prix	FIA Formula One World Championship; 1968 season	Next race: 1968 Italian Grand Prix
Previous race: 1967 German Grand Prix	German Grand Prix	Next race: 1969 German Grand Prix
Previous race: 1967 Italian Grand Prix	European Grand Prix (Designated European Grand Prix)	Next race: 1972 British Grand Prix
