= South African Grand Prix =

Auto race held in South Africa

- Prince George Circuit (1934–1966); Kyalami (1967–1985, 1992–1993)
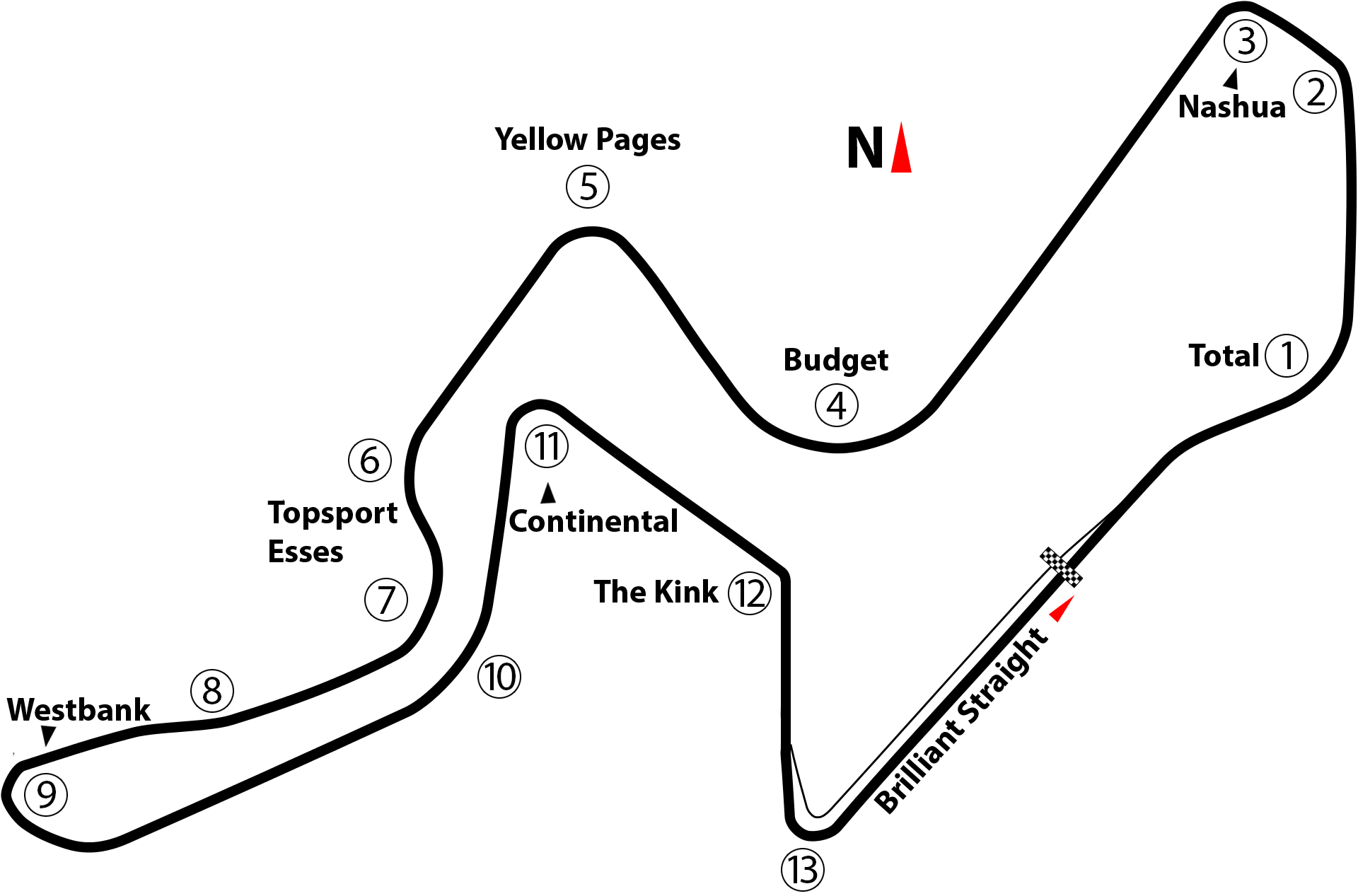

Race information
- Number of times held: 33
- First held: 1934
- Last held: 1993
- Most wins (drivers): (United Kingdom) Jim Clark (4)
- Most wins (constructors): (United Kingdom) Lotus (6)

Last race (1993)

Pole position
- (France) Alain Prost; Williams-Renault; 1:15.696

Podium
- 1. (France) Alain Prost; Williams-Renault; 1:38:45.082; 2. (Brazil) Ayrton Senna; McLaren-Ford; +1:19.824; 3. (United Kingdom) Mark Blundell; Ligier-Renault; +1 lap

Fastest lap
- (France) Alain Prost; Williams-Renault; 1:19.492

The South African Grand Prix was first run as a Grand Prix motor racing handicap race in 1934 at the Prince George Circuit at East London, Cape Province. It drew top drivers from Europe including Bernd Rosemeyer, Richard "Dick" Seaman, Richard Ormonde Shuttleworth and the 1939 winner Luigi Villoresi.

World War II brought an end to the race, but it was revived in 1960 as part of the Formula One circuit, entering the World Championship calendar two years later. It was a popular F1 event, but the Grand Prix was suspended right after the controversial 1985 race, due to the nation's policy of apartheid. Following the end of apartheid in 1991, the race returned to the Formula One schedule in 1992 and 1993. The 1993 race was the last South African Grand Prix, as of 2026. Plans to revive the race in 2024 were abandoned.

== History ==
Prince George Circuit (built in 1959)

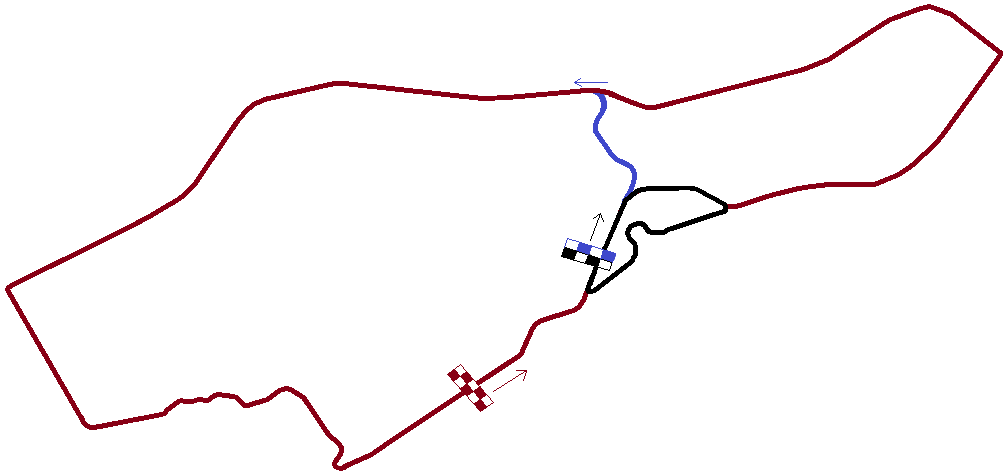
Layout of all versions of the Prince George Circuit Brown = 1934, Blue = 1936, Black = 1959

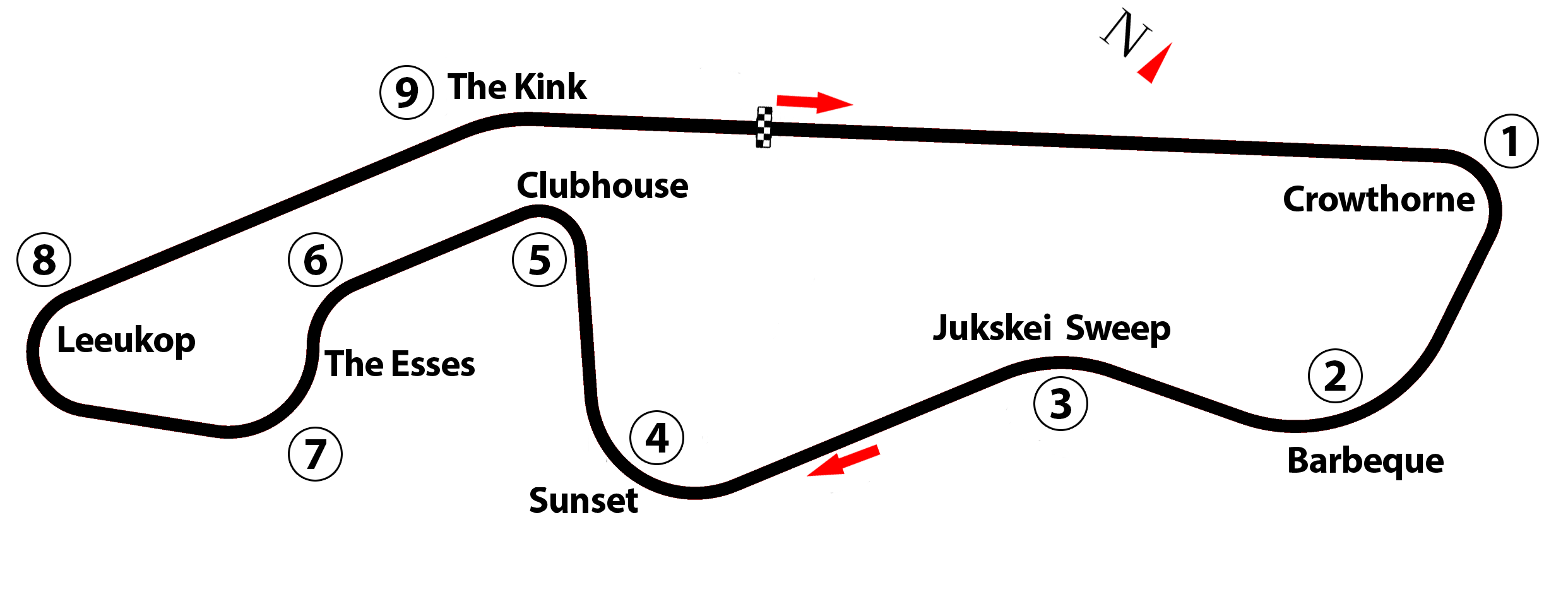
Kyalami (built in 1961)

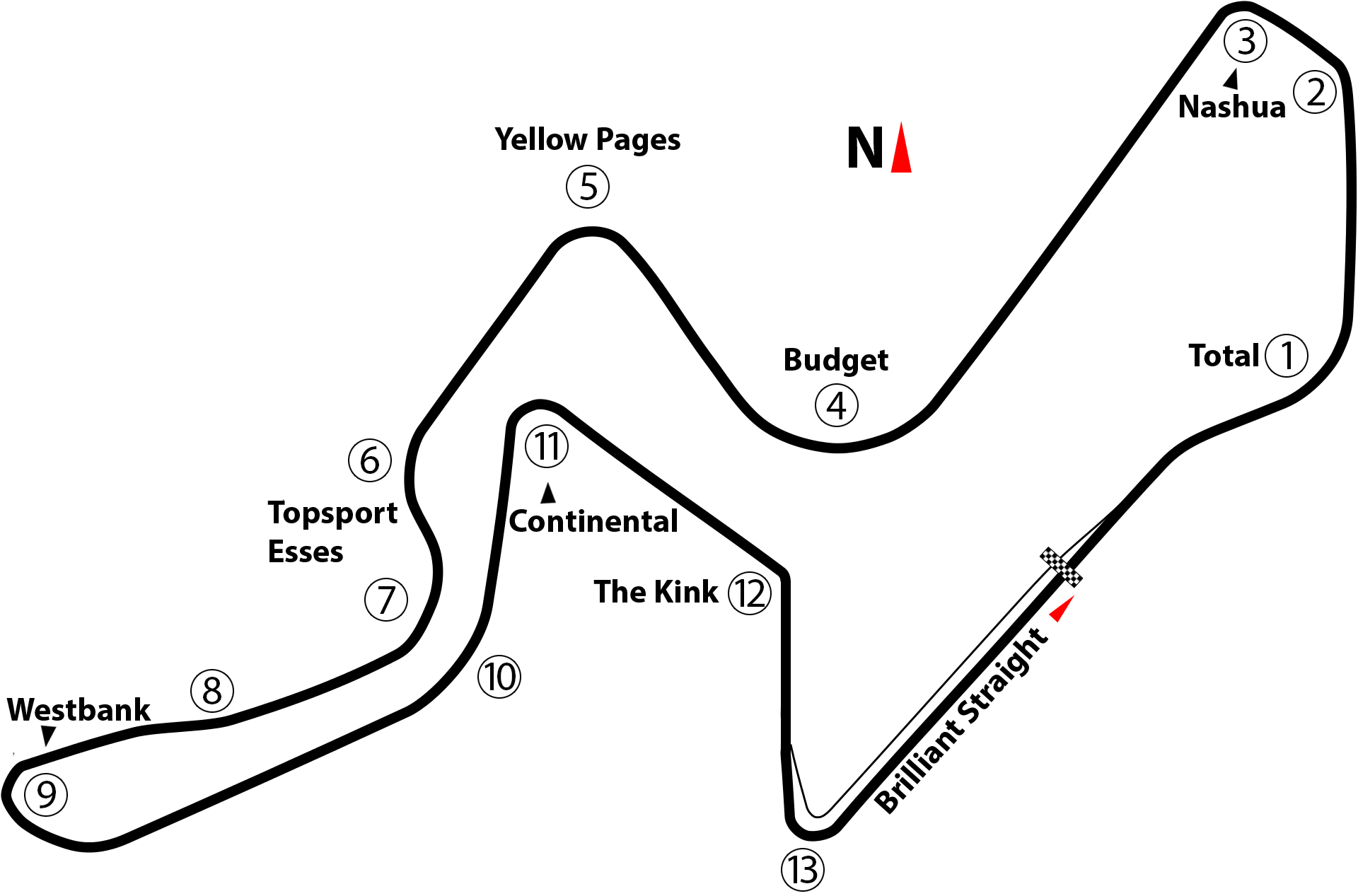
Kyalami (built in early 1990s)

=== East London (1934–1966) ===
The first South African Grands Prix were held on a 24.4 km (15.2 mi) road course known as the Prince George Circuit, running through different populated areas of the coastal city of East London. This was shortened to 17.7 km (11.0 mi) in 1936. When racing resumed after World War II, a permanent circuit was built in 1959 that retained the name Prince George Circuit. The first World Championship F1 race in South Africa was held on 29 December 1962. In that race, Graham Hill took advantage of Jim Clark's mechanical problems with his Lotus and took race victory and the championship. The race was held at Prince George again in 1963, 1965 and 1966, the latter relegated to non-championship status as a new 3-litre formula came into effect on the same day. In 1967, the race was moved to the Kyalami circuit near the high-altitude inland city of Johannesburg in the Transvaal, where it would remain as long as the South African Grand Prix was on the official Formula One calendar.

=== Kyalami (1967–1985,1992–1993) ===
The fast Kyalami circuit, built in the early 1960s, hosted its first South African Grand Prix in 1967, where privateer John Love nearly took victory but ran into fuel problems late, and Pedro Rodríguez took victory. 1968 saw Clark take his final F1 victory, breaking Juan Manuel Fangio's record for most career wins; he was killed at a Formula 2 race at Hockenheim later that year. The 1969 was won by Jackie Stewart, and the following year Jack Brabham won his last F1 race. 1971 saw Mario Andretti win in his debut for Ferrari. In the 1974, Peter Revson crashed during testing, slamming head-on into the barriers; he later died from his injuries. Carlos Reutemann won for the first time at that year's event. The 1975 was won by Jody Scheckter. The 1977, won by Niki Lauda, was the site of one of the most gruesome crashes in history, when track marshal Frederick Jansen Van Vuuren was hit at speed by Tom Pryce in an accident fatal to both men. The 1978 was won by Ronnie Peterson in a late victory over Patrick Depailler and Riccardo Patrese; the 1979 event, held in changeable weather conditions, was won by Gilles Villeneuve.

In the 1980s, turbo-charged cars began to dominate. Due to the high altitude of Kyalami (approximately 1,500 metres (5,000 ft) above sea level,) the forced induction turbo engines regulated how much air went into the engine whereas normally aspirated engines could not; turbo-charged engines had a horsepower advantage in 1982 of 150 hp and often qualified on the front row of the grid. Renault dominated the 1980 and 1982 races: Alain Prost won in 1982 after losing a wheel mid-distance. The 1981 event was a victim of the FISA–FOCA war. As agreement could not be reached with FISA for the Grand Prix to be run as a round of the Formula One World Championship or as a non-championship Formula One race, it was officially staged as a Formula Libre event. Consequently, it was contested only by the FOCA-aligned teams, with cars that did not strictly comply with the 1981 Formula One regulations. The 1983 event was the last race of that season, with a three-way battle for the Drivers' Championship between Prost, Nelson Piquet and René Arnoux. When Prost and Arnoux both went out with engine problems, Piquet took 3rd place and the Championship. The 1984 took place early in the season, and Prost, starting from the pit lane, drove through the field to finish 2nd behind Lauda.

By 1985, the event was mired in controversy after a state of emergency was declared by the South African government due to apartheid-related violence, as numerous countries boycotted events in South Africa. Some governments tried to ban their drivers from participating. Ligier and Renault withdrew in line with the French Government's ban on sporting events in South Africa, though Alain Prost and Philippe Streiff, both driving for British teams, took part. Nigel Mansell won his second consecutive Formula One race and his teammate Keke Rosberg took 2nd, completing a 1–2 for Williams. 1985 was the final South African Grand Prix until the end of apartheid.

Formula One returned to Kyalami in 1992 and 1993. The 1992 event was dominated by Mansell, and 1993 saw an intense battle between Prost, Ayrton Senna, and Michael Schumacher, with Prost victorious. In 1993, Kyalami was sold to the South African Automobile Association, which ran the facility at a profit, but holding a Formula One event was too costly, and F1 has yet to return to Africa.

The only South African driver to win the South African Grand Prix was Jody Scheckter in 1975. Jim Clark won four times and Niki Lauda three.

=== Possibility of a return ===
In April 2018, The South African discussed the possibility of South Africa returning to the Formula One Grand Prix calendar with Adrian Scholtz, CEO of Motorsport South Africa. He said the main obstacles are the high costs of hosting the event and the fact that currently no South African racetrack fulfills the FIA requirements to host a Formula One race.

In early 2023, a deal for a return of the South African Grand Prix for the 2024 season was close, but in June, the FIA declared that the South African Grand Prix would not return due to the South African government's stance on the Russian invasion of Ukraine.

In 2025, South Africa made a new bid for a return of the Grand Prix as early as 2027. In June 2025, the FIA approved planned upgrades to the Kyalami circuit to make it fulfill Formula One standards. However, according to Autosport.com, no deal is imminent, and is "far-fetched". There was also competition from other African countries to host Formula One, most notably Rwanda and Nigeria, but in October 2026 Rwanda secured a 10-year contract starting in the 2030s to host the African Grand Prix.

== Winners ==
=== By year ===
A pink background indicates an event which was not part of the Formula One World Championship.

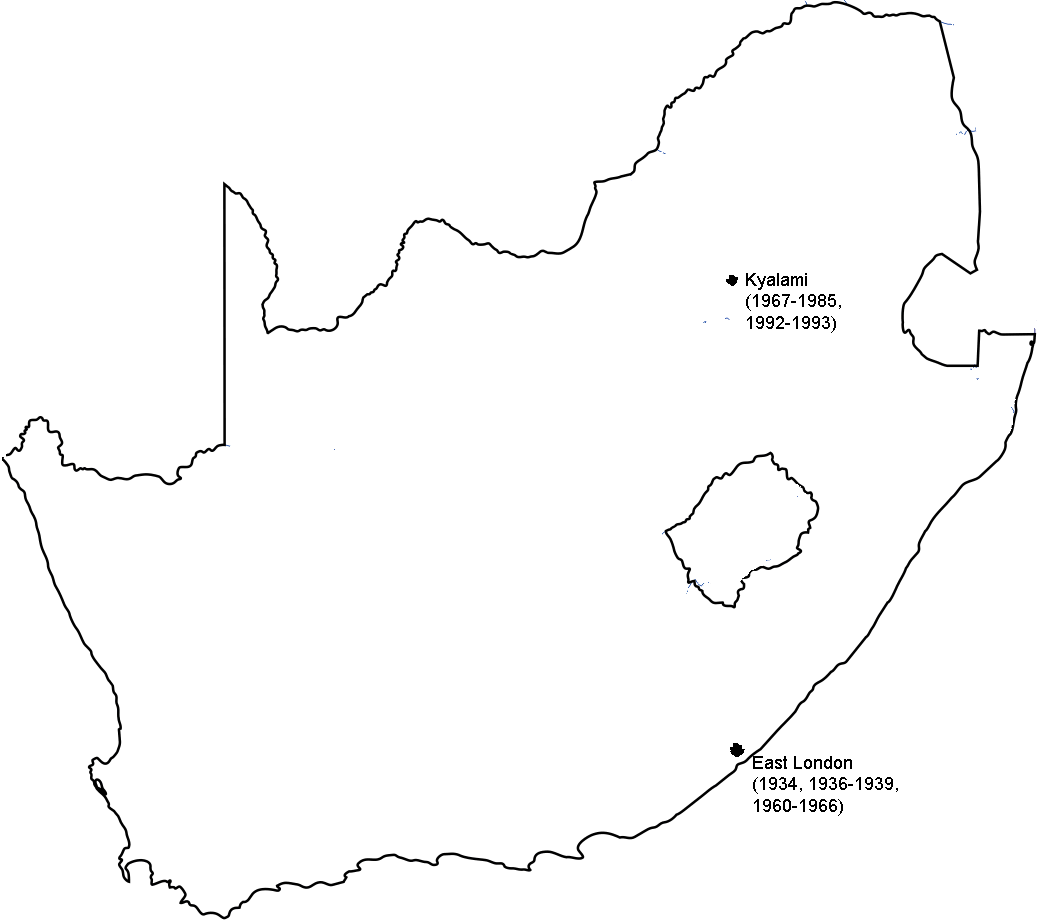
A map of both the locations of the South African Grand Prix

Year	Driver	Constructor	Location	Report
1934	(United States) Whitney Straight	Maserati 8CM	East London	Report
1935	Not held			
1936	(Italy) Mario Massacuratti	Bugatti 35B	East London	Report
1937	(United Kingdom) Pat Fairfield	ERA-B	East London	Report
1938	(United Kingdom) Buller Meyer	Riley	East London	Report
1939	(Italy) Luigi Villoresi	Maserati 6CM	East London	Report
1940 – 1959	Not held			
1960	(Belgium) Paul Frère	Cooper-Climax	East London	Report
1960	(United Kingdom) Stirling Moss	Porsche	East London	Report
1961	(United Kingdom) Jim Clark	Lotus-Climax	East London	Report
1962	(United Kingdom) Graham Hill	BRM	East London	Report
1963	(United Kingdom) Jim Clark	Lotus-Climax	East London	Report
1964	Not held			
1965	(United Kingdom) Jim Clark	Lotus-Climax	East London	Report
1966	(United Kingdom) Mike Spence	Lotus–Climax	East London	Report
1967	(Mexico) Pedro Rodríguez	Cooper-Maserati	Kyalami	Report
1968	(United Kingdom) Jim Clark	Lotus-Ford	Kyalami	Report
1969	(United Kingdom) Jackie Stewart	Matra-Ford	Kyalami	Report
1970	(Australia) Jack Brabham	Brabham-Ford	Kyalami	Report
1971	(United States) Mario Andretti	Ferrari	Kyalami	Report
1972	(New Zealand) Denny Hulme	McLaren-Ford	Kyalami	Report
1973	(United Kingdom) Jackie Stewart	Tyrrell-Ford	Kyalami	Report
1974	(Argentina) Carlos Reutemann	Brabham-Ford	Kyalami	Report
1975	(South Africa) Jody Scheckter	Tyrrell-Ford	Kyalami	Report
1976	(Austria) Niki Lauda	Ferrari	Kyalami	Report
1977	(Austria) Niki Lauda	Ferrari	Kyalami	Report
1978	(Sweden) Ronnie Peterson	Lotus-Ford	Kyalami	Report
1979	(Canada) Gilles Villeneuve	Ferrari	Kyalami	Report
1980	**(France)** René Arnoux	Renault	Kyalami	Report
1981	(Argentina) Carlos Reutemann	Williams-Ford	Kyalami	Report
1982	**(France)** Alain Prost	Renault	Kyalami	Report
1983	(Italy) Riccardo Patrese	Brabham-BMW	Kyalami	Report
1984	(Austria) Niki Lauda	McLaren-TAG	Kyalami	Report
1985	(United Kingdom) Nigel Mansell	Williams-Honda	Kyalami	Report
1986 – 1991	Not held due to Apartheid			
1992	(United Kingdom) Nigel Mansell	Williams-Renault	Kyalami	Report
1993	**(France)** Alain Prost	Williams-Renault	Kyalami	Report

=== Repeat winners (drivers) ===
A pink background indicates an event which was not part of the Formula One World Championship.

Wins	Driver	Years won
4	(United Kingdom) Jim Clark	1961, 1963, 1965, 1968
3	(Austria) Niki Lauda	1976, 1977, 1984
2	(United Kingdom) Jackie Stewart	1969, 1973
2	(Argentina) Carlos Reutemann	1974, 1981
2	(United Kingdom) Nigel Mansell	1985, 1992
2	**(France)** Alain Prost	1982, 1993

=== Repeat winners (constructors) ===
A pink background indicates an event which was not part of the Formula One World Championship.

Teams in bold are competing in the Formula One championship in 2026.

Wins	Constructor	Years won
6	(United Kingdom) Lotus	1961, 1963, 1965, 1966, 1968, 1978
4	**(Italy) Ferrari**	1971, 1976, 1977, 1979
4	**(United Kingdom) Williams**	1981, 1985, 1992, 1993
3	(United Kingdom) Brabham	1970, 1974, 1983
2	(Italy) Maserati	1934, 1939
2	(United Kingdom) Cooper	1960, 1967
2	(United Kingdom) Tyrrell	1973, 1975
2	**(France)** Renault	1980, 1982
2	**(United Kingdom) McLaren**	1972, 1984
2	Source:	

=== Repeat winners (engine manufacturers) ===
A pink background indicates an event which was not part of the Formula One World Championship.

Manufacturers in bold are competing in the Formula One championship in 2026.

Wins	Manufacturer	Years won
8	(United States) Ford *	1968, 1969, 1970, 1972, 1973, 1974, 1975, 1981
5	(United Kingdom) Climax	1960, 1961, 1963, 1965, 1966
4	**(Italy) Ferrari**	1971, 1976, 1977, 1979
4	(France) Renault	1980, 1982, 1992, 1993
3	(Italy) Maserati	1934, 1939, 1967

* Built by Cosworth
