= Ministry of Culture and Sport =

Ministry of Culture and Sport may refer to:

- Ministry of Culture and Sports (Greece)
- Ministry of Culture and Sports (Guatemala)
- Ministry of Culture and Sport (Israel)
- Ministry of Culture and Sports (Kazakhstan)
- Ministry of Culture, Heritage, Tourism and Sport (Manitoba)
- Ministry of Culture and Sports (Qatar)
- Ministry of Culture, Sports and Tourism (South Korea)
- Ministry of Culture and Sport (Spain)
- Department for Culture, Media and Sport (United Kingdom)
- Ministry of Culture, Sports and Tourism (Vietnam)

== See also ==
- Ministry of Culture and Tourism (disambiguation)
- Ministry of Education and Culture
- Culture minister
- Sports minister
