= Ministry of Sports and Human Resources (Rwanda) =

Government ministry of Rwanda

Ministry of Sports
- Minisiteri ya Siporo
- Emblem of Rwanda

Ministry overview
- Jurisdiction: Government of Rwanda
- Headquarters: KG 17 Avenue, Kigali
- Minister responsible: Nelly Mukazayire, Minister of Sports
- Deputy Minister responsible: Rwego Ngarambe, Minister of State in the Ministry of Sports
- Ministry executive: Olivier Brave Ngabo, Permanent Secretary
- Website: www.minisports.gov.rw

The Ministry of Sports (MINISPORTS) is the ministry of the Government of Rwanda in charge of sport. It develops policies that use sport for the economic and social transformation of the country.

The ministry is based in Kigali, near the Amahoro Stadium. Since December 2024, the minister has been Nelly Mukazayire.

== History ==
Until 2019, sport and culture were handled by the same ministry. In the November 2019 reshuffle, culture was moved to the Ministry of Youth.

== Role ==
The ministry's mission is to "develop and support the implementation of policies and strategies that promote sports development". Its vision is "inclusive sports excellence as a nation at the individual, community, organization, and business level". The headquarters are on KG 17 Avenue, near the Amahoro National Stadium.

The minister is assisted by a Minister of State, Rwego Ngarambe, appointed in December 2024. The Permanent Secretary, Olivier Brave Ngabo, was appointed in July 2026.

== Ministers ==
- Espérance Nyirasafari (until November 2019)
- Aurore Mimosa Munyangaju (November 2019 – August 2024)
- Richard Nyirishema (August 2024 – December 2024)
- Nelly Mukazayire (since December 2024)

=== Ministers of State ===
- Rwego Ngarambe (since December 2024)

== See also ==
- Sport in Rwanda
- Cabinet of Rwanda
