= Ministry of Culture and Tourism =

Ministry of Culture and Tourism may refer to:

- Ministry of Tourism and Culture (Ontario), Canada
- Ministry of Culture and Tourism (China)
- Ministry of Culture and Tourism (Ethiopia)
- Ministry of Culture and Tourism (Indonesia)
- Ministry of Tourism and Culture (Malaysia)
- Ministry of Culture (Pakistan)
- Ministry of Culture, Sports and Tourism (South Korea)
- Ministry of Culture and Tourism (Turkey)
- Department for Digital, Culture, Media and Sport, United Kingdom
- Ministry of Culture, Sports and Tourism (Vietnam)

== See also ==
- Culture minister
- Ministry of Education and Culture
- Ministry of Culture and Sport (disambiguation)
- Tourism minister
