= 1960 VI South African Grand Prix =

1960 (VI) South African Grand Prix
- Non-championship race in the 1960 Formula One season

Race details
- Date: 1 January 1960
- Official name: VI South African Grand Prix
- Location: Prince George Circuit, East London, South Africa
- Course: Temporary road circuit
- Course length: 3.926 km (2.440 miles)
- Distance: 60 laps, 235.558 km (146.400 miles)

Fastest lap
Driver	(United Kingdom) Stirling Moss	Cooper-Borgward
- Time: 1:38.75

Podium
First	(Belgium) Paul Frère	Cooper-Climax
Second	(United Kingdom) Stirling Moss	Cooper-Borgward
Third	(South Africa) Syd van der Vyver	Cooper-Alfa Romeo

The 6th South African Grand Prix was a motor race, run to Formula Libre rules, held on 1 January 1960 in East London. The race was run over 60 laps of the circuit, and was won by Belgian driver Paul Frère, his second Grand Prix victory following the 1952 Grand Prix des Frontières. Stirling Moss finished second and also set the fastest lap of the race. Local driver Syd van der Vyver finished in third place.

The race was the first of two South African Grands Prix in 1960, with the 7th South African Grand Prix to be held on 27 December 1960.

== Results ==
Pos	No	Driver	Constructor	Laps	Time/Retired
1	2	(Belgium) Paul Frère	Cooper-Climax	60	
2	7	(United Kingdom) Stirling Moss	Cooper-Borgward	60	
3		(South Africa) Syd van der Vyver	Cooper-Alfa Romeo	60	
4		(Belgium) Lucien Bianchi	Cooper-Climax	59	+1 Lap
5		(South Africa) Don Philp	Cooper-Climax	59	+1 Lap
6		(South Africa) Ian Fraser-Jones	Porsche	57	+3 Laps
7		(Federation of Rhodesia and Nyasaland) John Love	Jaguar	57	+3 Laps
8		(Federation of Rhodesia and Nyasaland) Sam Tingle	Connaught	57	+3 Laps
9		(United Kingdom) Dick Gibson	Cooper-Climax	56	+4 Laps
Ret		(South Africa) Horse Boyden	Cooper-Porsche	29	Fuel pump
Ret		(United Kingdom) Chris Bristow	Cooper-Borgward	22	Gearbox
Ret		(South Africa) Alan Korte	Lotus-Climax	19	Gearbox
Ret		(Federation of Rhodesia and Nyasaland) Jimmy Shield	Cooper-Climax	4	Engine
Ret		(United Kingdom) Bruce Halford	Cooper-Climax		
Ret		(South Africa) Tony Maggs	Tojeiro-Jaguar		
Ret		(South Africa) Doug Serrurier	Cooper-Alfa Romeo		
Ret		(South Africa) Bill Jennings	Dart-Porsche		
Ret		(South Africa) R.T. Humphreys	Cooper-Climax		
Ret		(South Africa) John Hanning	Austin		
Ret		(South Africa) L.J. Jocabsz	Maserati-Corvette		
Ret		(South Africa) Fanie Viljoen	Ferrari		
Ret		(South Africa) Helmut Menzler	Lotus-Borgward		
Ret		(South Africa) Dr. Dave Wright	Lotus		
Ret		(South Africa) Eric Glasby	Tojeiro-Bristol		

Previous race: 1959 Silver City Trophy	Formula One non-championship races 1960 season	Next race: 1960 New Zealand Grand Prix
Previous race: 1939 South African Grand Prix	South African Grand Prix	Next race: 1960 VII South African Grand Prix
