= 1960 VII South African Grand Prix =

1960 (VII) South African Grand Prix
- Non-championship race in the 1960 Formula One season

Race details
- Date: 27 December 1960
- Official name: VII South African Grand Prix
- Location: Prince George Circuit, East London, South Africa
- Course: Temporary road circuit
- Course length: 3.926 km (2.440 miles)
- Distance: 80 laps, 314.08 km (195.20 miles)

Pole position
Driver	(United Kingdom) Stirling Moss	Porsche
- Time: 1:38.0

Fastest lap
Driver	(Sweden) Jo Bonnier	Porsche
- Time: 1:35.7

Podium
First	(United Kingdom) Stirling Moss	Porsche
Second	(Sweden) Jo Bonnier	Porsche
Third	(Australia) Jack Brabham	Cooper-Climax

The 7th South African Grand Prix was a motor race, run to Formula Libre rules, held on 27 December in East London. The race was run over 80 laps of the circuit, and was dominated by British driver Stirling Moss who took pole and came home in first place. Jo Bonnier finished second and also set the fastest lap of the race. The 1960 Formula One World Champion Jack Brabham finished third.

The race was the second South African Grand Prix to be held in 1960, with the 6th South African Grand Prix having been held on 1 January 1960.

== Results ==
Pos	Driver	Constructor	Laps	Time/Retired
1	(United Kingdom) Stirling Moss	Porsche	80	2:11:02
2	(Sweden) Jo Bonnier	Porsche	80	+14
3	(Australia) Jack Brabham	Cooper-Climax	79	+1 Lap
4	(South Africa) Syd van der Vyver	Lotus-Alfa Romeo	78	+2 Laps
5	(Germany) Wolfgang Seidel	Cooper-Climax	77	+3 Laps
6	(South Africa) Bruce Johnstone	Cooper-Alfa Romeo	76	+4 Laps
7	(United Kingdom) Dick Gibson	Cooper-Climax	75	+5 Laps
8	(South Africa) Dr. Dave Wright	Cooper-Climax	75	+5 Laps
9	(South Africa) Doug Serrurier	Cooper-Alfa Romeo	74	+6 Laps
10	(South Africa) Helmut Menzler	Lotus-Borgward	73	+7 Laps
11	(Federation of Rhodesia and Nyasaland) Sam Tingle	Connaught	72	+8 Laps
12	(South Africa) John Hanning	Austin-Jaguar	72	+8 Laps
13	(South Africa) Dawie Gous	Porsche	71	+9 Laps
14	(South Africa) Fanie Viljoen	Maserati	71	+9 Laps
15	(Netherlands) Carel Godin de Beaufort	Cooper-Climax	71	+9 Laps
16	(Federation of Rhodesia and Nyasaland) George Cannell	Cooper-Chevrolet	70	+10 Laps
17	(South Africa) Bill Jennings	Jennings-Porsche	70	+10 Laps
18	(South Africa) N. Payne	Lotus-Ford	69	+11 Laps
Ret	(Federation of Rhodesia and Nyasaland) John Love	Cooper-Maserati		
Ret	(South Africa) Don Philp	Cooper-Climax		
Ret	(South Africa) Tony Kotze	Lotus		
Ret	(South Africa) Vic Procter	Vic-Alfa Romeo		
Ret	(South Africa) Ernie Pieterse	Heron-Alfa Romeo		
Ret	(Germany) Wolfgang von Trips	Lotus-Climax		Ignition
Ret	(South Africa) Clive Trundell	Austin-Riley		Engine

Previous race: 1960 Cape Grand Prix	Formula One non-championship races 1960 season	Next race: 1961 New Zealand Grand Prix
Previous race: 1960 VI South African Grand Prix	South African Grand Prix	Next race: 1961 South African Grand Prix
