= Lyailya Galievna Galimzhanova =

Soviet-Kazakhstani politician (1924–2017)

Lyailya Galievna Galimzhanova (1924–2017) was a Soviet-Kazakhstani Politician (Communist). She served as Minister of Culture in 1967–1975. She served as Minister of Social Security in 1985–1990.
