= Ministry of Education and Culture =

A ministry of education and culture is a cabinet position in the governments of several nations. In some nations the ministry of education and the ministry of culture are separate departments; in others, the ministry of education and culture also includes arts, science, sports, etc.

The ministry is politically responsible for education and promoting and protecting cultural expression.

== Ministries of education and culture by country ==
- Ministry of Education and Culture (Cyprus)
- Ministry of Education and Culture (Finland)
- Ministry of Education and Culture (Israel) A position that existed in 1949–1977, 1984–1990, 1992–1993, and is now the Ministry of Education.
- Ministry of Education and Culture (Mozambique)
- Ministry of Education and Culture (Philippines) A position that existed from 1978-2001 and is now the Department of Education.
- Ministry of Education and Culture (Spain) A position that existed from 1996-2000 and is now the Ministry of Education.
- Ministry of Education and Culture (Somalia)
- Ministry of Education and Culture (Tanzania)
- Ministry of Education and Culture (Uruguay)

== Similarly named ministries in other countries ==
- Ministry of Education (Austria)
- Ministry of Education, Religious Affairs, Culture and Sports (Greece)
- Ministry of Education, Science and Culture (Iceland)
- Ministry of Education, Culture, Research, and Technology (Indonesia)
- Ministry of Education, Culture, Sports, Science and Technology, Japan
- Ministry of Education, Culture, Science, and Sports (Mongolia)
- Ministry of Education, Culture and Science (Netherlands)
- Ministry of Education, Research and Culture (Sweden)
- Ministry of Education, Sport and Culture (Zimbabwe)

== See also ==
- Cultural genocide
- Culture minister
- Economic, social and cultural rights
- Education minister
- Human rights
- Ministry of Culture (disambiguation)
- Ministry of Culture and Sport (disambiguation)
- Ministry of Culture and Tourism (disambiguation)
- Right to an adequate standard of living
- Right to education
- Right to science and culture
- Welfare rights
