= 1967 South African Grand Prix =

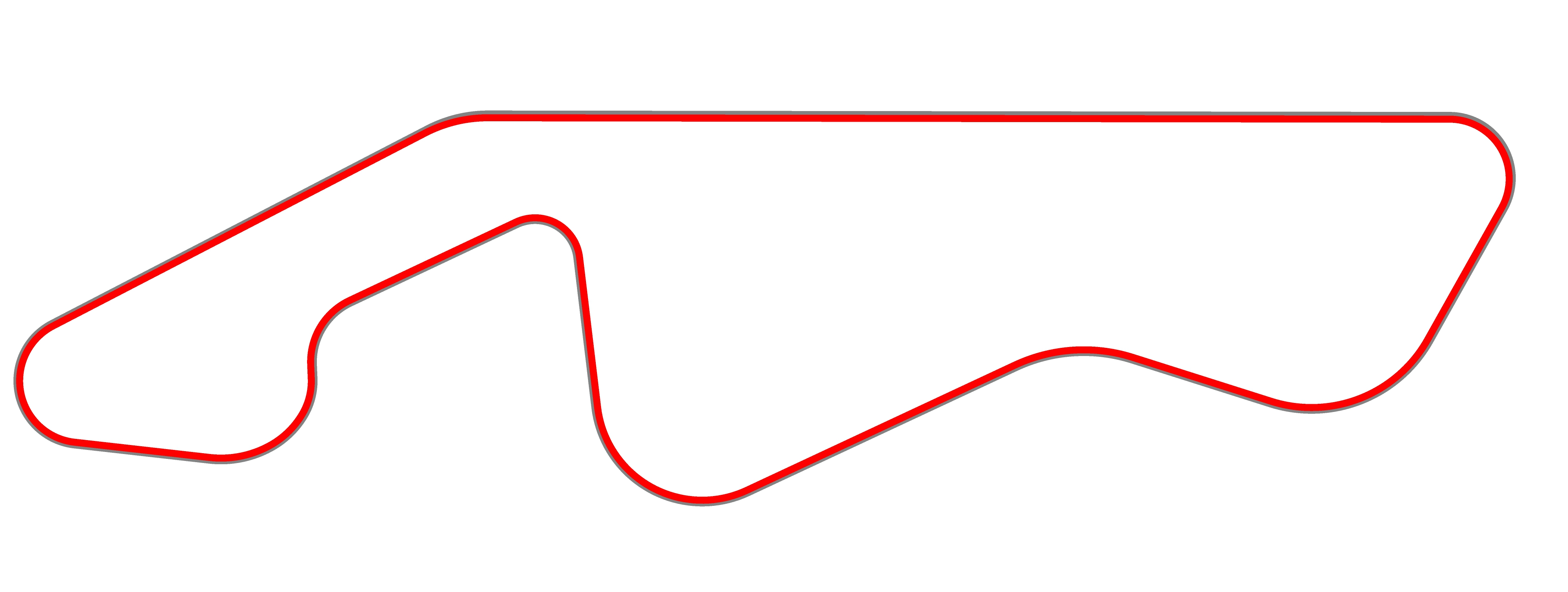

Race details
- Date: 2 January 1967
- Official name: 1st AA Grand Prix of South Africa
- Location: Kyalami, Transvaal Province, South Africa
- Course: Permanent race track
- Course length: 4.094 km (2.544 miles)
- Distance: 80 laps, 327.520 km (203.511 miles)

Pole position
Driver	(Australia) Jack Brabham	Brabham-Repco
- Time: 1:28.3

Fastest lap
Driver	(New Zealand) Denny Hulme	Brabham-Repco
- Time: 1:29.9 on lap 3

Podium
First	(Mexico) Pedro Rodríguez	Cooper-Maserati
Second	(Rhodesia) John Love	Cooper-Climax
Third	(United Kingdom) John Surtees	Honda

The 1967 South African Grand Prix, formally the 1st AA Grand Prix of South Africa (Afrikaans: Eerste AA Suid-Afrikaanse Grand Prix), was a Formula One motor race held at Kyalami on 2 January 1967. It was race 1 of 11 in both the 1967 World Championship of Drivers and the 1967 International Cup for Formula One Manufacturers. The 80-lap race was won by Cooper driver Pedro Rodríguez after he started from fourth position. John Love finished second in a privately entered Cooper and Honda driver John Surtees came in third.

== Race report ==
This was the first use of the Kyalami circuit near Johannesburg in a World Championship Formula One race. Taking place in the southern hemisphere and no less than five months before the F1 season resumed in May with the 1967 Monaco Grand Prix, mostly machinery from 1966 was used, the first year of F1's sudden "return to power", with proper 3 liter engines in short supply. Some teams used old Climax FPF engines of the 2.5 liter era that ended in 1960, or more recent undersized V8 from Coventry Climax.

Ferrari, which was also taking part in the 1967 World Sportscar Championship with V12 and V6 engine cars, and with the Ferrari Dino 166 F2 in Formula Two and Tasman Series downunder, did not attend. There were some changes in the driver line-ups: John Surtees was driving for Honda, and Graham Hill had switched to Lotus were the Ford-sponsored Cosworth DFV was in development. His former place at BRM was taken by Mike Spence, and Pedro Rodríguez was on trial for Cooper.

Brabham had been the dominating team in 1966, and would win in 1967, too. Denny Hulme led Jack Brabham away from the start, but Brabham soon spun, handing second place to Surtees, but by lap 21 had managed to regain second. Further down the field, Rhodesian privateer racer John Love reached third place in a four-cylinder Cooper Climax. On lap 41, Brabham retired, followed by Dan Gurney on lap 44. On lap 59, Hulme had to pit for more brake fluid, handing the lead to Love. Love's drive was halted as with just seven laps left he had to pit to take on more fuel, however it was later discovered that he'd had enough fuel to finish and instead had a misfire caused by electrical issues. Rodríguez took his first win in Formula One for Cooper from Love in second place and Surtees in third. The victory marked the first for a Mexican driver in a World Championship Formula One race.

== Classification ==
=== Qualifying ===
Pos	No	Driver	Constructor	Time	Gap
1	1	(Australia) Jack Brabham	Brabham-Repco	1:28.3	—
2	2	(New Zealand) Denny Hulme	Brabham-Repco	1:28.9	+0.6
3	7	(United Kingdom) Jim Clark	Lotus-BRM	1:29.0	+0.7
4	4	(Mexico) Pedro Rodríguez	Cooper-Maserati	1:29.1	+0.8
5	17	(Rhodesia) John Love	Cooper-Climax	1:29.5	+1.2
6	11	(United Kingdom) John Surtees	Honda	1:29.6	+1.3
7	3	(Austria) Jochen Rindt	Cooper-Maserati	1:30.2	+1.9
8	19	(South Africa) Dave Charlton	Brabham-Climax	1:30.2	+1.9
9	5	(United Kingdom) Jackie Stewart	BRM	1:30.3	+2.0
10	14	(United Kingdom) Bob Anderson	Brabham-Climax	1:30.6	+2.3
11	9	(United States) Dan Gurney	Eagle-Climax	1:30.7	+2.4
12	15	(Sweden) Jo Bonnier	Cooper-Maserati	1:31.8	+3.5
13	6	(United Kingdom) Mike Spence	BRM	1:32.1	+3.8
14	18	(Rhodesia) Sam Tingle	LDS-Climax	1:32.4	+4.1
15	8	(United Kingdom) Graham Hill	Lotus-BRM	1:32.6	+4.3
16	12	(Switzerland) Jo Siffert	Cooper-Maserati	1:32.8	+4.5
17	20	(South Africa) Luki Botha	Brabham-Climax	1:33.1	+4.8
18	16	(United Kingdom) Piers Courage	Lotus-BRM	1:33.8	+5.5

=== Race ===
Pos	No	Driver	Constructor	Laps	Time/Retired	Grid	Points
1	4	(Mexico) Pedro Rodríguez	Cooper-Maserati	80	2:05:45.9	4	9
2	17	(Rhodesia) John Love	Cooper-Climax	80	+ 26.4	5	6
3	11	(United Kingdom) John Surtees	Honda	79	+ 1 Lap	6	4
4	2	(New Zealand) Denny Hulme	Brabham-Repco	78	+ 2 Laps	2	3
5	14	(United Kingdom) Bob Anderson	Brabham-Climax	78	+ 2 Laps	10	2
6	1	(Australia) Jack Brabham	Brabham-Repco	76	+ 4 Laps	1	1
NC	19	(South Africa) Dave Charlton	Brabham-Climax	63	+ 17 Laps	8	
NC	20	(South Africa) Luki Botha	Brabham-Climax	60	+ 20 Laps	17	
Ret	18	(Rhodesia) Sam Tingle	LDS-Climax	56	Accident	14	
Ret	16	(United Kingdom) Piers Courage	Lotus-BRM	51	Fuel System	18	
Ret	9	(United States) Dan Gurney	Eagle-Climax	44	Suspension	11	
Ret	12	(Switzerland) Jo Siffert	Cooper-Maserati	41	Engine	16	
Ret	3	(Austria) Jochen Rindt	Cooper-Maserati	38	Engine	7	
Ret	6	(United Kingdom) Mike Spence	BRM	31	Oil Leak	13	
Ret	15	(Sweden) Jo Bonnier	Cooper-Maserati	30	Engine	12	
Ret	7	(United Kingdom) Jim Clark	Lotus-BRM	22	Engine	3	
Ret	8	(United Kingdom) Graham Hill	Lotus-BRM	6	Accident	15	
Ret	5	(United Kingdom) Jackie Stewart	BRM	2	Engine	9	

== Notes ==
- This was the Formula One World Championship debut for South African driver Luki Botha.
- This was the only podium for John Love and a Rhodesian driver, the first win and podium for Pedro Rodríguez and a Mexican driver.

== Championship standings after the race ==
Drivers' Championship standings

Pos	Driver	Points
1	(Mexico) Pedro Rodríguez	9
2	(Rhodesia) John Love	6
3	(United Kingdom) John Surtees	4
4	(New Zealand) Denny Hulme	3
5	(United Kingdom) Bob Anderson	2

Constructors' Championship standings

Pos	Constructor	Points
1	(United Kingdom) Cooper-Maserati	9
2	(United Kingdom) Cooper-Climax	6
3	(Japan) Honda	4
4	(United Kingdom) Brabham-Repco	3
5	(United Kingdom) Brabham-Climax	2

- Notes: Only the top five positions are included for both sets of standings.

Previous race: 1966 Mexican Grand Prix	FIA Formula One World Championship; 1967 season	Next race: 1967 Monaco Grand Prix
Previous race: 1966 South African Grand Prix	South African Grand Prix	Next race: 1968 South African Grand Prix
