= African Grand Prix =

Planned Formula One race in Rwanda

- RISE Motordrome (planned); Bugesera District, Eastern Province, Rwanda
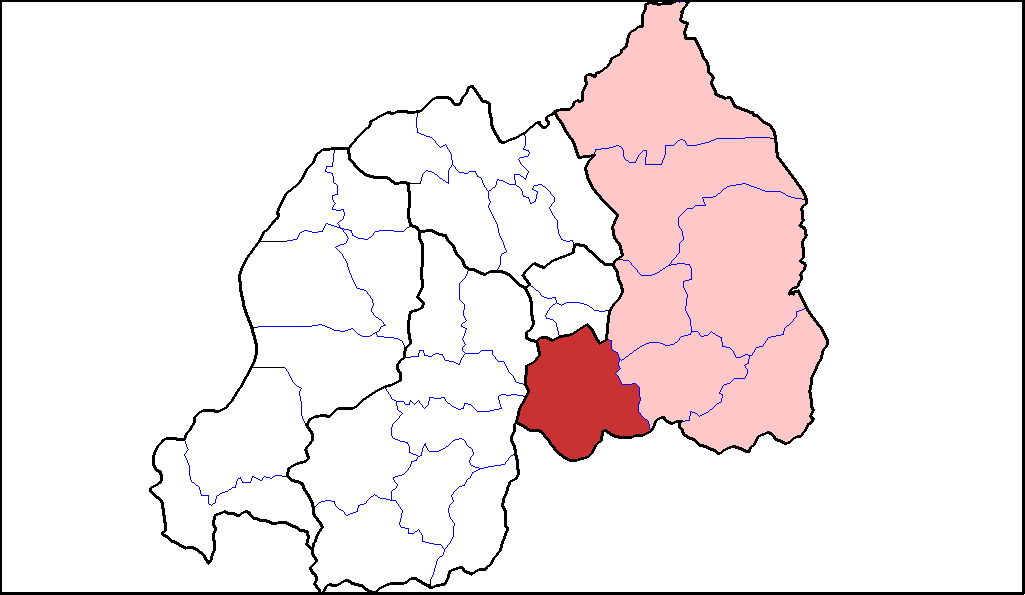

Race information
- Number of times held: 0
- First held: Early 2030s (planned)

The African Grand Prix is a planned Formula One motor race to be held in Rwanda on a purpose-built circuit in Bugesera District, about 40 km (25 mi) south of Kigali. Announced in October 2026 under a ten-year agreement, it is expected to join the championship calendar in the early 2030s.

It would be the first Formula One race in Africa since the 1993 South African Grand Prix, and would give the championship a race on every inhabited continent.

== Background ==
Africa hosted world championship races in Morocco in 1958 and in South Africa, at the Prince George Circuit in East London and later at Kyalami, until 1993. President Paul Kagame announced Rwanda's bid to host a Grand Prix in December 2024, at the opening of the FIA General Assemblies in Kigali; in August 2024 Formula One chief executive Stefano Domenicali had described Rwanda as a serious option, with a race on a permanent track. Seven-time world champion Lewis Hamilton had long called for a race in Africa. Critics, including opponents of Kagame, described the project as sportswashing.

== Announcement ==
Kagame announced the ten-year agreement with Formula One at a ceremony in Kigali on 13 October 2026. The event is to be called the Formula 1 African Grand Prix and presented by Visit Rwanda. No date was set for the first race, which depends on the completion of the circuit. Amnesty International UK said the deal would help Rwanda improve its image and deflect attention from its human rights record.

== Circuit ==
The planned RISE Motordrome is to be built in Bugesera, in the Eastern Province, next to the new international airport under construction there. It is designed by Tilke Engineers & Architects and WurzDesign, the firm of former driver Alexander Wurz, to FIA Grade 1 standards. The layout uses the area's natural relief: it runs between two hills and beside a lake, with a total climb of about 197 metres (646 ft) per lap and a straight of more than 1 kilometre (0.62 mi). The project, led by the Rwanda Development Board, is part of a wider sports, tourism and business development, and the venue is also intended for other motorsport events and conferences.
