= 1981 South African Grand Prix =

- Non-championship race in the 1981 Formula One season
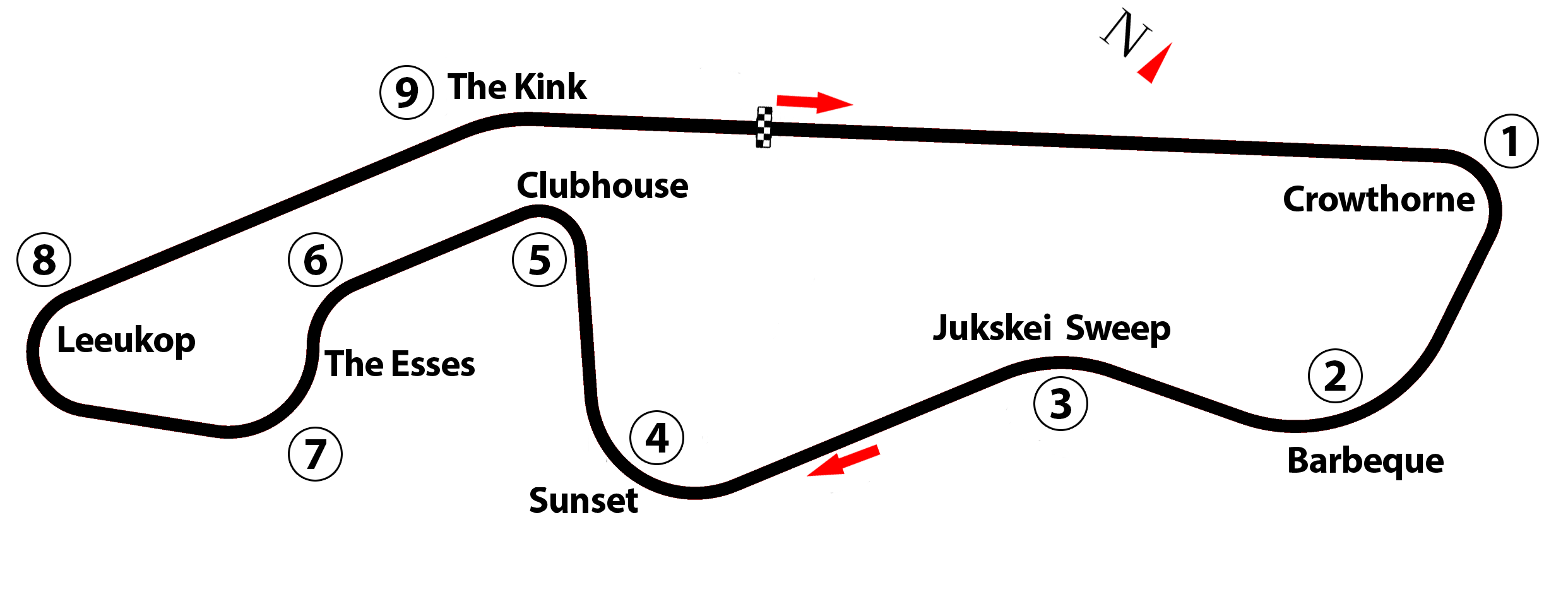

Race details
- Date: 7 February 1981
- Location: Kyalami; Transvaal Province, South Africa
- Course: Permanent racing facility
- Course length: 4.104 km (2.550 miles)
- Distance: 77 laps, 316.008 km (196.358 miles)
- Weather: Wet/Dry

Pole position
Driver	(Brazil) Nelson Piquet	Brabham-Ford
- Time: 1:12.78

Fastest lap
Driver	(Argentina) Carlos Reutemann	Williams-Ford
- Time: 1:13.61 on Lap 72

Podium
First	(Argentina) Carlos Reutemann	Williams-Ford
Second	(Brazil) Nelson Piquet	Brabham-Ford
Third	(Italy) Elio de Angelis	Lotus-Ford

The 1981 South African Grand Prix was a Formula Libre motor race held on 7 February 1981 at Kyalami featuring the FOCA-aligned Formula One teams and Formula One chassis.

The race was originally scheduled to be the opening round of the 1981 FIA Formula One World Championship. However, the ongoing war between Fédération Internationale du Sport Automobile (FISA) and the Formula One Constructors' Association (FOCA) resulted in FISA insisting on a date change which was not acceptable to the race organisers. Approval was ultimately given for the race to go ahead on its original date, but as a Formula Libre race rather than as a round of the Formula One World Championship. The downgraded race was supported by the teams affiliated with FOCA, but not by the manufacturer teams (Alfa Romeo, Ferrari, Ligier, Osella and Renault), all of whom were aligned with FISA. (Toleman was experiencing troubles with its overweight car and would not debut until the San Marino Grand Prix). The eleven teams present all fielded cars fitted with sliding side skirts, aerodynamic devices which were illegal in Formula One for 1981 but acceptable under Formula Libre regulations. The absence of the manufacturer teams meant that all 19 cars in the race were powered by Ford Cosworth engines. Due to tyre manufacturer Goodyear's retirement from the sport at the end of the previous season and Michelin's alignment with FISA, the cars ran equipped with old Avon tyres supplied by Bernie Ecclestone.

The race began in very wet conditions but the rain stopped, and the track soon dried. The race was eventually won by Carlos Reutemann, driving a Williams. Reutemann was the only driver to make the bold choice to start the race on slick tyres, which proved very effective in the drying conditions. Nelson Piquet, who led early, was second in a Brabham and Elio de Angelis third in a Lotus.

Reutemann summed up the unsettled political climate of the weekend by saying, "I raced for nothing. No points, no money, no trophy."

== Classification ==
=== Qualifying ===
Pos.	No.	Driver	Constructor	Q1	Q2	Gap
1	5	(Brazil) Nelson Piquet	Brabham-Ford	1:12.94	1:12.78	—
2	2	(Argentina) Carlos Reutemann	Williams-Ford	1:12.98	-	+0.20
3	1	(Australia) Alan Jones	Williams-Ford	1:13.78	1:13.28	+0.50
4	20	(Finland) Keke Rosberg	Fittipaldi-Ford	1:14.45	1:13.29	+0.51
5	11	(Italy) Elio de Angelis	Lotus-Ford	1:14.00	1:13.47	+0.69
6	29	(Italy) Riccardo Patrese	Arrows-Ford	1:15.03	1:14.07	+1.29
7	6	(Argentina) Ricardo Zunino	Brabham-Ford	1:14.71	1:14.35	+1.57
8	12	(United Kingdom) Nigel Mansell	Lotus-Ford	1:14.38	1:14.48	+1.60
9	8	(Italy) Andrea de Cesaris	McLaren-Ford	1:14.91	1:14.39	+1.61
10	9	(Netherlands) Jan Lammers	ATS-Ford	1:14.93	1:14.85	+2.07
11	30	(Italy) Siegfried Stohr	Arrows-Ford	1:16.16	1:14.93	+2.15
12	3	(United States) Eddie Cheever	Tyrrell-Ford	1:14.95	1:15.32	+2.17
13	21	(Brazil) Chico Serra	Fittipaldi-Ford	1:15.06	-	+2.28
14	14	(Switzerland) Marc Surer	Ensign-Ford	1:15.63	1:15.18	+2.40
15	7	(United Kingdom) John Watson	McLaren-Ford	1:15.25	1:15.85	+2.47
16	4	(South Africa) Desire Wilson	Tyrrell-Ford	1:15.56	1:16.22	+2.78
17	17	(Republic of Ireland) Derek Daly	March-Ford	1:16.80	-	+4.02
18	33	(United Kingdom) Geoff Lees	Theodore-Ford	1:17.39	1:17.08	+4.30
19	18	(Chile) Eliseo Salazar	March-Ford	-	-	-

=== Race ===
Pos.	Driver	Constructor	Laps	Time/Retired	Qual
1	(Argentina) Carlos Reutemann	Williams-Ford	77	1.44:54.03	2
2	(Brazil) Nelson Piquet	Brabham-Ford	77	+ 20.14	1
3	(Italy) Elio de Angelis	Lotus-Ford	77	+ 1:06.24	5
4	(Finland) Keke Rosberg	Fittipaldi-Ford	76	+ 1 Lap	4
5	(United Kingdom) John Watson	McLaren-Ford	76	+ 1 Lap	15
6	(Italy) Riccardo Patrese	Arrows-Ford	76	+ 1 Lap	6
7	(United States) Eddie Cheever	Tyrrell-Ford	76	+ 1 Lap	12
8	(Argentina) Ricardo Zunino	Brabham-Ford	75	+ 2 Laps	7
9	(Brazil) Chico Serra	Fittipaldi-Ford	75	+ 2 Laps	13
10	(United Kingdom) Nigel Mansell	Lotus-Ford	74	+ 3 Laps	8
11	(Republic of Ireland) Derek Daly	March-Ford	74	+ 3 Laps	17
Ret	(Australia) Alan Jones	Williams-Ford	62	Skirt	3
Ret	(Switzerland) Marc Surer	Ensign-Ford	58	Battery	14
Ret	(Italy) Andrea de Cesaris	McLaren-Ford	54	Accident	9
Ret	(South Africa) Desiré Wilson	Tyrrell-Ford	51	Accident	16
Ret	(Chile) Eliseo Salazar	March-Ford	32	Gearbox	19
Ret	(Netherlands) Jan Lammers	ATS-Ford	16	Brakes	10
Ret	(Italy) Siegfried Stohr	Arrows-Ford	12	Engine	11
Ret	(United Kingdom) Geoff Lees	Theodore-Ford	11	Accident	18

Previous race: 1980 Spanish Grand Prix	Formula One non-championship races 1981 season	Next race: 1983 Race of Champions
Previous race: 1980 South African Grand Prix	South African Grand Prix	Next race: 1982 South African Grand Prix
