= 1939 South African Grand Prix =

Voiturette race

Layout of the Prince George Circuit (1936-1939)

The 1939 South African Grand Prix was a voiturette race held at the Prince George Circuit in East London, South Africa on 2 January 1939. The race consisted of 18 laps, each with a distance of 11.03 miles (17.75 km).

It was the last major international race in South Africa until 1960. Luigi Villoresi won the race with an average speed just under 100 miles per hour (160 km/h). Third-place finisher Mario Massacuratti had the fastest lap.

== Classification ==
| Pos | No | Driver | Car | Laps | Time/Retired |
|---|---|---|---|---|---|
| 1 | 6 | (Italy) Luigi Villoresi | Maserati 6CM | 18 | 1:59'26" |
| 2 | 7 | (Italy) Franco Cortese | Maserati 6CM | 18 | 2:00'50" |
| 3 | 15 | (Italy) Mario Massacuratti | Maserati 6CM | 18 | 2:01'50" |
| 4 | 14 | (South Africa) Roy Hesketh | ERA R3A | 18 | 2:04'05" |
| 5 | 1 | (United Kingdom) Earl Howe | ERA R8B | 18 | 2:05'09" |
| 6 | 5 | (Switzerland) Armand Hug | Maserati 4CM | 18 | 2:05'33" |
| 7 | 11 | (United Kingdom) Peter Aitken | ERA R8B | 18 | 2:09'56" |
| 8 | 9 | (South Africa) Steve Chiappini | Maserati 6CM | 18 | 2:09'56" |
| Ret | 12 | (France) Louis Gérard | Maserati 6CM | 10 | Piston |
| Ret | 3 | (South Africa) Fay Taylour | Riley 1500/6 | 4 | Engine |
| Ret | 2 | (South Africa) Enzo Filangeri | Maserati 6CM | 3 | Piston |
| Ret | 10 | (United Kingdom) Peter Whitehead | ERA B | 2 | Piston |
| Ret | 4 | (Germany) Paul Pietsch | Maserati 6CM | 1 | Piston |
| Ret | 8 | (Italy) Piero Taruffi | Maserati 6CM | 1 | Clutch |
