= Ministry of sports =

A ministry of sports or ministry of youth and sports is a kind of government ministry found in certain countries with responsibility for the regulation of sports, particularly those participated in by young people. It is led by the minister of sport (or sports minister).

The United States is one of the only countries in the world to have no ministry (department) of sports and provide no government funding for its National Olympic Committee.

== List of ministries by country ==
=== Africa ===
- Botswana: Ministry of Youth, Gender, Sport and Culture
- Burkina Faso: Ministry of Tourism, Culture and Sports
- Ghana: Ministry of Youth and Sports
- Kenya: Youth and Sports Ministry
- Malawi: Ministry of Youth and Sports
- Rwanda: Ministry of Sports and Human Resources
- Somalia: Ministry of Youth and Sports
- Somaliland: Ministry of Youth and Sports
- South Africa: Minister of Sports, Arts and Culture
- Tanzania: Ministry of Social Affairs and Sports
- Zimbabwe: Ministry of Youth, Sport, Arts and Recreation

=== Americas ===
- Argentina: Ministry of Tourism and Sports
- Brazil: Ministry of Sports
- Canada: Minister of Sport and Persons with Disabilities
  - Manitoba: Minister of Culture, Heritage, Tourism and Sport
  - Ontario: Ministry of Sport
- Colombia: Coldeportes - Reorganized as the National Ministry of Sports in 2020

=== Asia ===
- Armenia: Ministry of Education, Science, Culture and Sports
- Azerbaijan: Ministry of Youth and Sports
- Bangladesh: Ministry of Youth and Sports
- Brunei: Ministry of Culture, Youth and Sports
- China: State General Administration of Sports
- India: Ministry of Youth Affairs and Sports
- Indonesia: Ministry of Youth and Sports
- Iran: Ministry of Youth Affairs and Sports
- Israel: Ministry of Culture and Sport
- Japan: Ministry of Education, Culture, Sports, Science and Technology
- Malaysia: Minister of Youth and Sports
- Myanmar: Ministry of Sports and Youth Affairs
- Nepal: Ministry of Youth and Sports
- North Korea: Ministry of Ethnic Affairs and Sports
- Oman: Minister of Culture, Sports and Youth
- Palestine: Ministry of Youth and Sports
- Qatar: Ministry of Culture and Sports
- Saudi Arabia: Ministry of Sport
- Singapore: Ministry of Culture, Community and Youth
- South Korea: Ministry of Culture, Sports and Tourism
- Sri Lanka: Ministry of Telecommunication, Foreign Employment and Sports
- Taiwan: Ministry of Sports
- Tajikistan: Ministry of Culture and Sports
- Thailand: Ministry of Tourism and Sports
- Turkey: Ministry of Youth and Sports
- United Arab Emirates: Ministry of Sports
- Vietnam: Ministry of Culture, Sports and Tourism

=== Europe ===
- Belarus: Ministry of Sports
- Belgium: Sports and Youth Ministry
- Cyprus: Ministry of Education, Sport and Youth
- France: Minister of Youth Affairs and Sports
- Georgia: Ministry of Sport and Youth Affairs
- Greece: Ministry of Education, Religious Affairs and Sports
- Hungary: Ministry of Education and Sports
- Ireland: Minister for Culture, Communications and Sport
- Iceland: Ministry of Youth Affairs and Sports
- North Macedonia: Ministry of Ethics and Sports
- Moldova: Ministry of Youth and Sports
- Portugal: Ministry of Culture, Youth and Sports
- Russia: Ministry of Sport
- Serbia: Ministry of Youth and Sports
- Slovakia: Ministry of Tourism and Sport
- Switzerland: Federal office of Sport
- United Kingdom: Minister for Sport and Civil Society
  - Department for Culture, Media and Sport
  - Scotland: Cabinet Secretary for Health, Wellbeing and Sport

=== Oceania ===
- Australia: Minister for Sport
  - New South Wales: Minister for Sport
  - Victoria: Minister for Sport
  - Northern Territory: Minister for Sport and Recreation
  - Western Australia: Minister for Sport and Recreation
- New Zealand: Minister for Sport and Recreation

== See also ==
- Ministry of Culture and Sport (disambiguation)
