= Nelly Mukazayire =

Rwandan economist

- Born: 1982 (age 43–44); Rwanda
- Education: University of Rwanda (Bachelor of Science in International Economics); Makerere University (Master of Arts in Economic Policy Management)
- Title: Minister for the Ministry of sports, Rwanda.

Nelly Mukazayire (born 1982) is a Rwandan economist and public administrator, who served as the chief executive officer of the Rwanda Convention Bureau, a division of the Rwanda Development Board. She was promoted to the post of Deputy CEO of RDB in March 2023 In September 2024, she was promoted to the position of permanent secretary and transferred to the ministry of sports in the Rwandan government. In December 2024, she was promoted as the minister of sports, where she has a mandate to implement the sports policy.

Before that, she served as the deputy chief of staff in the office of the president of Rwanda and as a senior adviser to the chief of staff in the office of the president. Before she came to the president's office, she served as a policy researcher in the economics department in the prime minister's office.

== Early life and education ==
Nelly Mukazayire was born to Rwandese parents in Rwanda in 1982. She attended local schools for her primary and secondary education. She studied at the earning a Bachelor of Science degree in International Economics.

She also holds a Master of Arts degree in Economic Policy Management from Makerere University, in neighboring Uganda.

== Career ==
For most of her career, Ms Mukazayire has worked as a government official. In an October 2018 cabinet reshuffle, she was named as the CEO of Rwanda Convention Bureau, a government department. In her current position, she is at the rank of a Minister of State and reports directly to Clare Akamanzi, the executive director and CEO of Rwanda Development Board, a cabinet-level position.

Her unit is responsible for implementing the policy of developing and expanding the "Meetings, Incentives, Conferences and Exhibitions" (MICE) policy of the Rwandan government. That section of the tourism sector was responsible for 15 percent of tourism revenue, amounting to US$42 million in 2017, and projected to grow to US$74 million in 2018. On 11 September 2024, she was appointment by president Kagame as the Permanent Secretary in the Ministry of Sports.

== Personal life ==
Nelly Mukazayire is married.

Mukazayire was 12 years old during the Rwandan genocide in 1994. Her mother was given a lifetime prison sentence by a Gacaca court for being a participant in the genocide. Mukazayire has spoken about her mother's conviction to demonstrate how the current Rwandan government does not transfer blame to the offspring and other family members of the genocide perpetrators.

== See also ==
- Cabinet of Rwanda
