= Heron (automobile) =

The Heron was a Formula Junior racing car designed by Les Redmond and Syd (a.k.a. Jim or Dig) Diggory. It was fitted with a Ford 105E engine.

== Les Redmond ==
Redmond had a long history designing and building cars such as the Mooreland and Chequered Flag's Gemini Formula Junior cars.

== Racing history ==
=== Transfer to South Africa ===
The prototype (its only version) was sold to Tony Maggs in 1960 and re-engined with a Climax engine. Maggs intended to race the car in the South African Grand Prix at East London, however mechanical problems meant he failed to make the grid. Maggs sold the car to Ernest Pieterse of the Scuderia Alfa Team who fitted it with a Conrero 1488cc Alfa Romeo STR-4 engine.

=== Ernie Pieterse ===
The Heron's best placing in the South African non-championship Formula One racing series was 6th in the 1961 Rand Grand Prix. On 23 July 1961 the Heron came 2nd in Mozambique Grand Prix and the following week, 1st in the 1961 Rhodesian Grand Prix at Belvedere, Harare (was Salisbury). Pieterse drove the car from 1960 to 1962. He then acquired a Lotus 21 and sold the Heron to David Hume of Team Valencia in 1964. Hume raced the car in 1964 and 1965. Andrew Smuts raced the Heron in its final race the 1966 Natal Winter Grand Prix. Of its 8 South African races, it only finished 3.

=== Historic racing car ===
In 2004 the Heron re-emerged in the United Kingdom in the hands of Eddie Perk, a former South African. He ran it at the 2005 Goodwood Revival meeting and various Historic Racing Car Association meetings. Perk returned to South Africa with the Heron for the 2010 International.
