= 1982 South African Grand Prix =

First race of the 1982 Formula One World Championship

- Race 1 of 16 in the 1982 Formula One World Championship
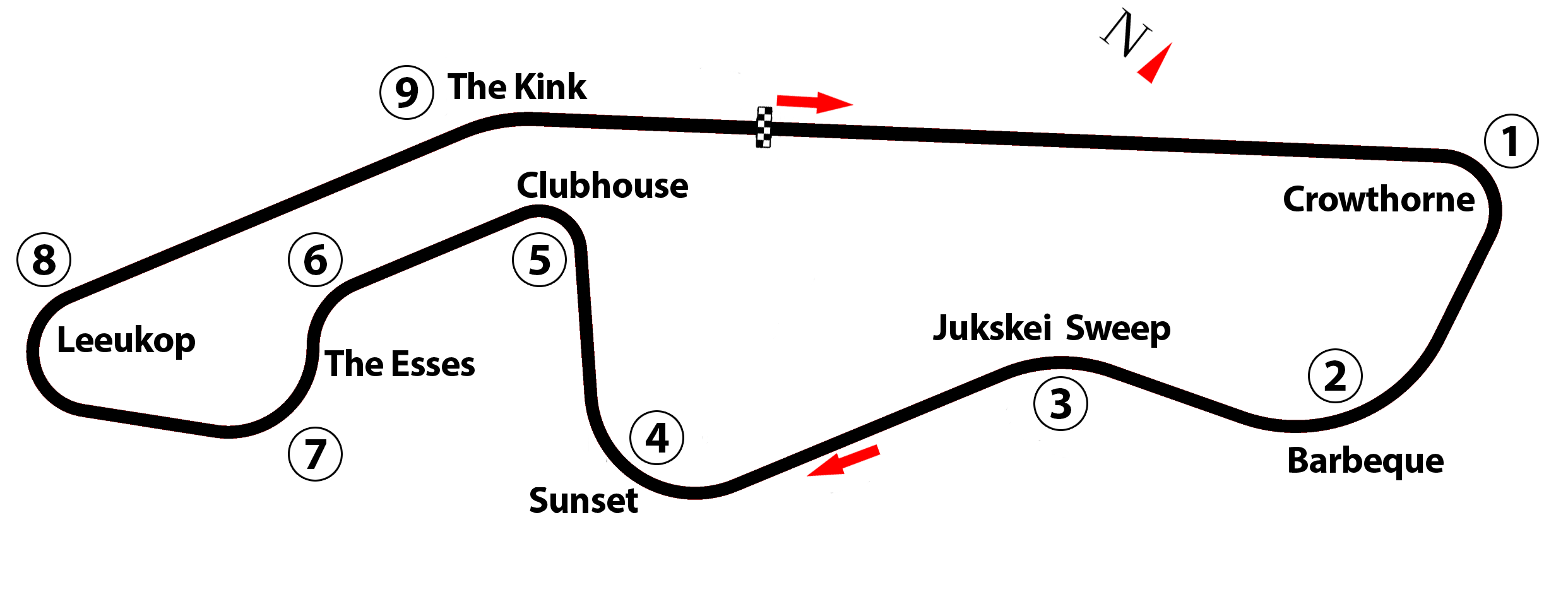

Race details
- Date: 23 January 1982
- Location: Kyalami; Transvaal Province, South Africa
- Course: Permanent racing facility
- Course length: 4.104 km (2.550 miles)
- Distance: 77 laps, 316.008 km (196.358 miles)
- Weather: Dry

Pole position
Driver	(France) René Arnoux	Renault
- Time: 1:06.351

Fastest lap
Driver	(France) Alain Prost	Renault
- Time: 1:08.278 on lap 49

Podium
First	(France) Alain Prost	Renault
Second	(Argentina) Carlos Reutemann	Williams-Ford
Third	(France) René Arnoux	Renault

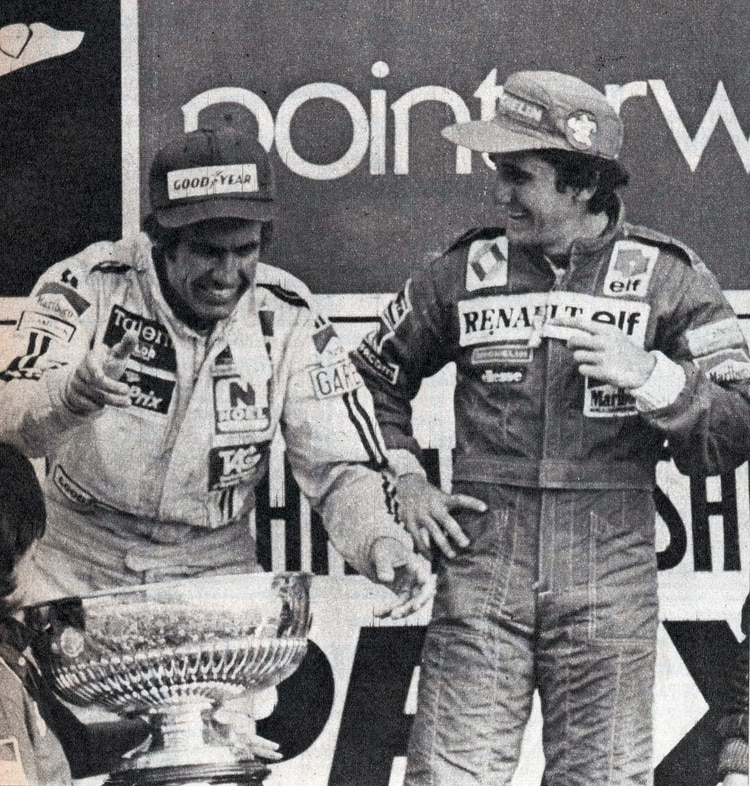
Reutemann and Prost on the podium.

The 1982 South African Grand Prix was a Formula One motor race held at Kyalami on 23 January 1982. It was the first race of the 1982 Formula One World Championship. It was the 28th edition of the South African Grand Prix and the 16th time that the race had been held at Kyalami. As of 2026, this is the most recent F1 race to have been held in January.

The prelude to the race was notable for a strike action by the Grand Prix Drivers' Association, led by Niki Lauda and Didier Pironi, in protest at the new superlicence conditions imposed by FISA, which would have tied the drivers to a single team for up to three years. A late compromise was reached and the race went ahead. The drivers were subsequently fined between US$5,000 and US$10,000 and handed suspended race bans; however, the FIA Court of Appeal later reduced the penalties and criticised FISA's handling of the dispute.

Turbocharged cars took the first six positions on the grid. Despite Alain Prost suffering a puncture while leading, he was able to recover (from over a lap behind) to win the race. Lauda, in his first race after two years out of F1, finished fourth. This was the final podium and points finish for runner-up Carlos Reutemann, who retired from Formula One after the next race in Brazil. As of 2025, this is the most recent podium finish achieved by an Argentine driver and was the last points finish for an Argentine driver until Franco Colapinto scored points at the 2024 Azerbaijan Grand Prix.

== Classification ==
=== Qualifying ===
Pos	No.	Driver	Constructor	Time	Gap
1	16	(France) René Arnoux	Renault	1:06.351	
2	1	(Brazil) Nelson Piquet	Brabham-BMW	1:06.625	+0.274
3	27	(Canada) Gilles Villeneuve	Ferrari	1:07.106	+0.755
4	2	(Italy) Riccardo Patrese	Brabham-BMW	1:07.398	+1.047
5	15	(France) Alain Prost	Renault	1:08.133	+1.782
6	28	(France) Didier Pironi	Ferrari	1:08.360	+2.009
7	6	(Finland) Keke Rosberg	Williams-Ford	1:08.892	+2.541
8	5	(Argentina) Carlos Reutemann	Williams-Ford	1:09.306	+2.955
9	7	(United Kingdom) John Watson	McLaren-Ford	1:09.736	+3.385
10	3	(Italy) Michele Alboreto	Tyrrell-Ford	1:10.037	+3.686
11	26	(France) Jacques Laffite	Ligier-Matra	1:10.241	+3.890
12	10	(Chile) Eliseo Salazar	ATS-Ford	1:10.624	+4.273
13	8	(Austria) Niki Lauda	McLaren-Ford	1:10.681	+4.330
14	35	(United Kingdom) Derek Warwick	Toleman-Hart	1:10.685	+4.334
15	11	(Italy) Elio de Angelis	Lotus-Ford	1:10.685	+4.334
16	22	(Italy) Andrea de Cesaris	Alfa Romeo	1:10.952	+4.601
17	25	(United States) Eddie Cheever	Ligier-Matra	1:11.005	+4.654
18	12	(United Kingdom) Nigel Mansell	Lotus-Ford	1:11.227	+4.876
19	23	(Italy) Bruno Giacomelli	Alfa Romeo	1:11.285	+4.934
20	9	(West Germany) Manfred Winkelhock	ATS-Ford	1:11.808	+5.457
21	18	(Brazil) Raul Boesel	March-Ford	1:12.077	+5.726
22	17	(West Germany) Jochen Mass	March-Ford	1:12.100	+5.749
23	4	(Sweden) Slim Borgudd	Tyrrell-Ford	1:12.366	+6.015
24	33	(Republic of Ireland) Derek Daly	Theodore-Ford	1:13.418	+7.067
25	20	(Brazil) Chico Serra	Fittipaldi-Ford	1:13.467	+7.116
26	31	(France) Jean-Pierre Jarier	Osella-Ford	1:13.834	+7.483
DNQ	30	(Italy) Mauro Baldi	Arrows-Ford	1:13.976	+7.625
DNQ	32	(Italy) Riccardo Paletti	Osella-Ford	1:15.504	+9.153
DNQ	29	(United Kingdom) Brian Henton	Arrows-Ford	1:16.653	+10.302
DNQ	36	(Italy) Teo Fabi	Toleman-Hart	No time	

=== Race ===
Pos	No	Driver	Constructor	Tyre	Laps	Time/Retired	Grid	Points
1	15	(France) Alain Prost	Renault	M	77	1:32:08.401	5	9
2	5	(Argentina) Carlos Reutemann	Williams-Ford	G	77	+ 14.946	8	6
3	16	(France) René Arnoux	Renault	M	77	+ 27.900	1	4
4	8	(Austria) Niki Lauda	McLaren-Ford	M	77	+ 32.113	13	3
5	6	(Finland) Keke Rosberg	Williams-Ford	G	77	+ 43.139	7	2
6	7	(United Kingdom) John Watson	McLaren-Ford	M	77	+ 50.993	9	1
7	3	(Italy) Michele Alboreto	Tyrrell-Ford	G	76	+ 1 lap	10	
8	11	(Italy) Elio de Angelis	Lotus-Ford	G	76	+ 1 lap	15	
9	10	(Chile) Eliseo Salazar	ATS-Ford	A	75	+ 2 laps	12	
10	9	(West Germany) Manfred Winkelhock	ATS-Ford	A	75	+ 2 laps	20	
11	23	(Italy) Bruno Giacomelli	Alfa Romeo	M	74	+ 3 laps	19	
12	17	(West Germany) Jochen Mass	March-Ford	P	74	+ 3 laps	22	
13	22	(Italy) Andrea de Cesaris	Alfa Romeo	M	73	+ 4 laps	16	
14	33	(Republic of Ireland) Derek Daly	Theodore-Ford	A	73	+ 4 laps	24	
15	18	(Brazil) Raul Boesel	March-Ford	P	72	+ 5 laps	21	
16	4	(Sweden) Slim Borgudd	Tyrrell-Ford	G	72	+ 5 laps	23	
17	20	(Brazil) Chico Serra	Fittipaldi-Ford	P	72	+ 5 laps	25	
18	28	(France) Didier Pironi	Ferrari	G	71	+ 6 laps	6	
Ret	26	(France) Jacques Laffite	Ligier-Matra	M	54	Fuel system	11	
Ret	35	(United Kingdom) Derek Warwick	Toleman-Hart	P	43	Accident	14	
Ret	2	(Italy) Riccardo Patrese	Brabham-BMW	G	18	Turbo	4	
Ret	25	(United States) Eddie Cheever	Ligier-Matra	M	11	Fuel system	17	
Ret	27	(Canada) Gilles Villeneuve	Ferrari	G	6	Turbo	3	
Ret	1	(Brazil) Nelson Piquet	Brabham-BMW	G	3	Spun off	2	
Ret	12	(United Kingdom) Nigel Mansell	Lotus-Ford	G	0	Electrical	18	
Ret	31	(France) Jean-Pierre Jarier	Osella-Ford	P	0	Collision	26	
DNQ	30	(Italy) Mauro Baldi	Arrows-Ford	P				
DNQ	32	(Italy) Riccardo Paletti	Osella-Ford	P				
DNQ	29	(United Kingdom) Brian Henton	Arrows-Ford	P				
DNQ	36	(Italy) Teo Fabi	Toleman-Hart	P				
WD	14	(Colombia) Roberto Guerrero	Ensign-Ford	A				

== Championship standings after the race ==
Drivers' Championship standings

Pos	Driver	Points
1	(France) Alain Prost	9
2	(Argentina) Carlos Reutemann	6
3	(France) René Arnoux	4
4	(Austria) Niki Lauda	3
5	(Finland) Keke Rosberg	2

Constructors' Championship standings

Pos	Constructor	Points
1	(France) Renault	13
2	(United Kingdom) Williams-Ford	8
3	(United Kingdom) McLaren-Ford	4

- Note: Only the top five positions are included for both sets of standings.

Previous race: 1981 Caesars Palace Grand Prix	FIA Formula One World Championship; 1982 season	Next race: 1982 Brazilian Grand Prix
Previous race: 1981 South African Grand Prix	South African Grand Prix	Next race: 1983 South African Grand Prix
