= Sport in Rwanda =

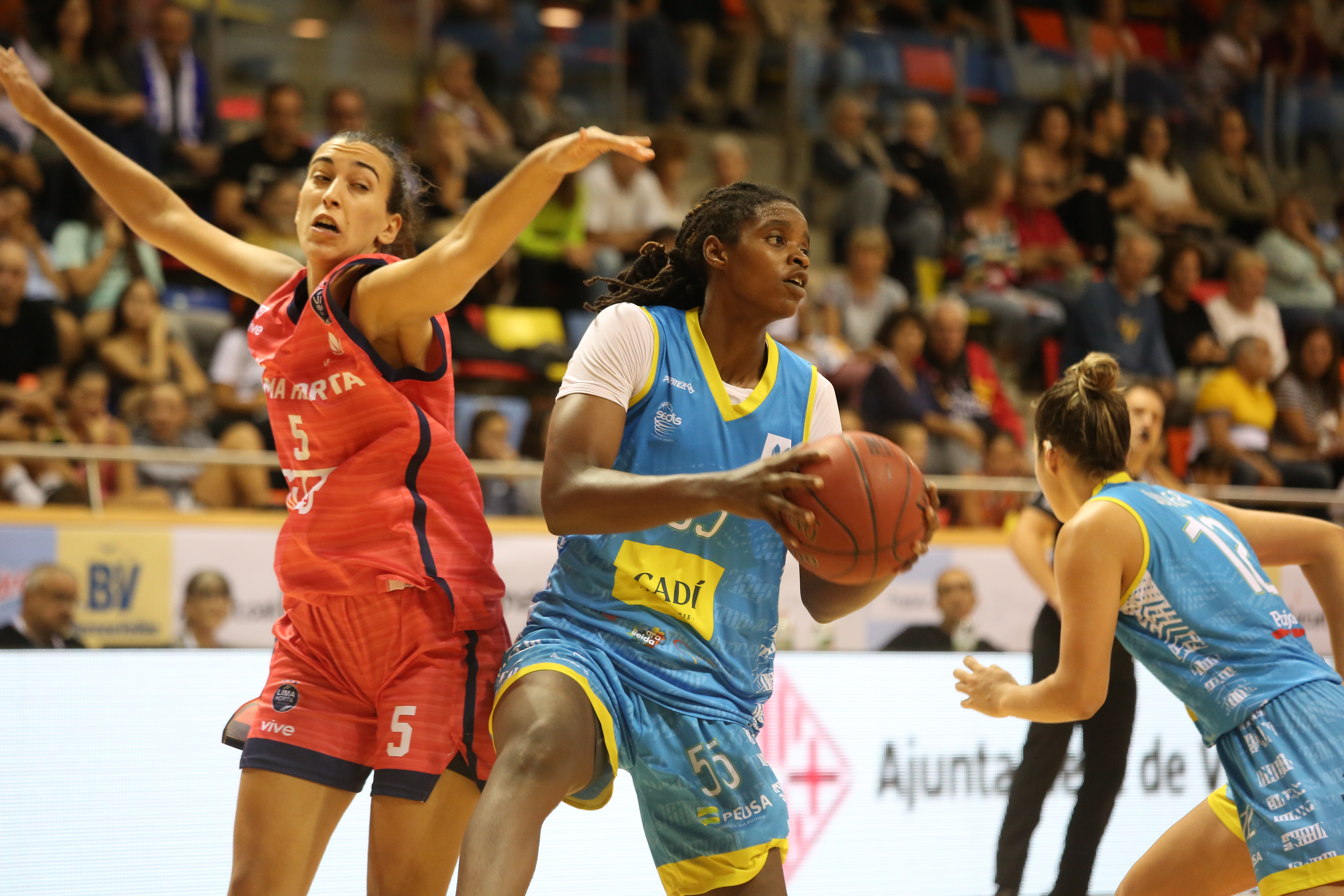
Basketball is the second most prominent sport in Rwanda

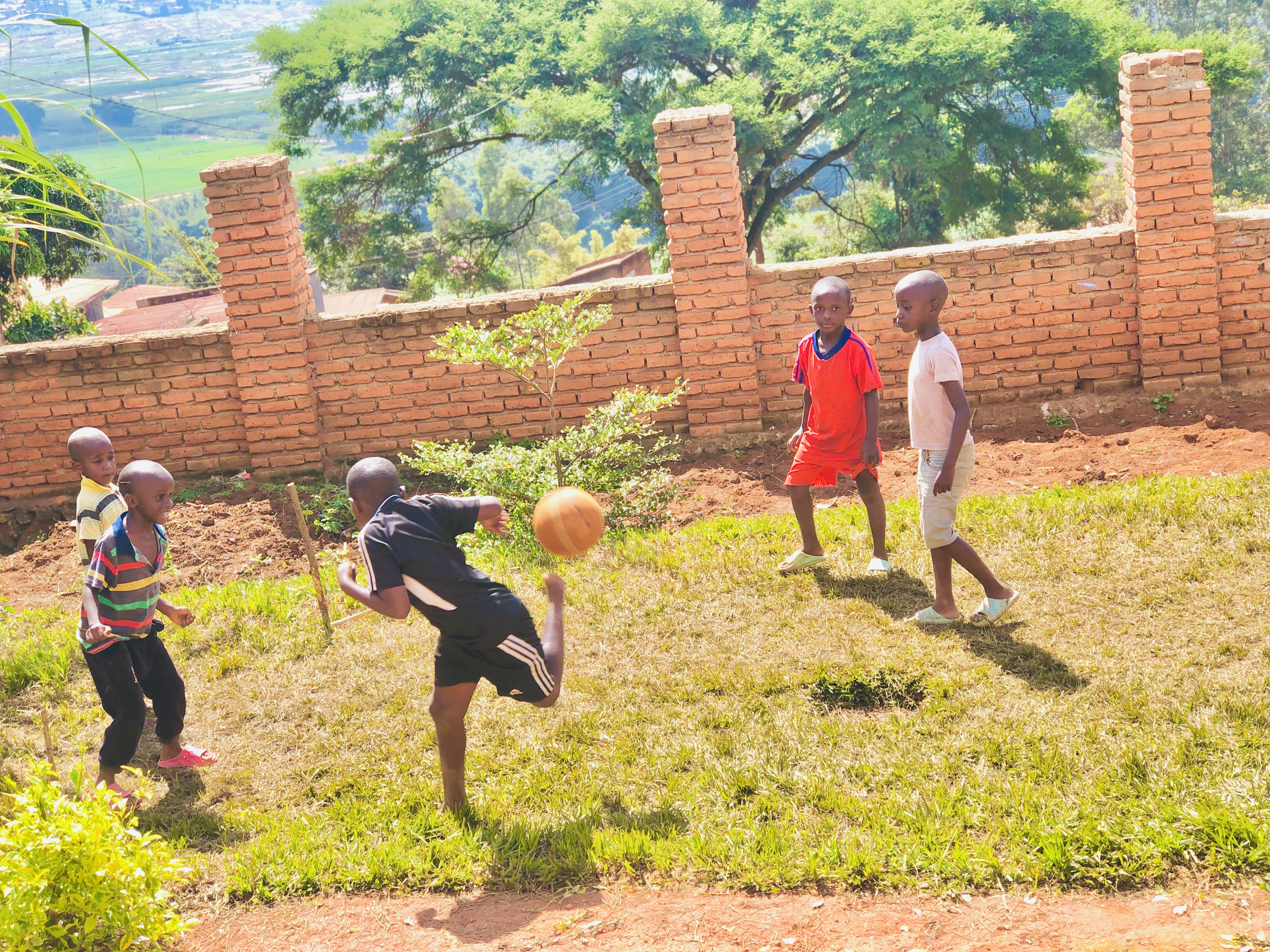
Children playing football

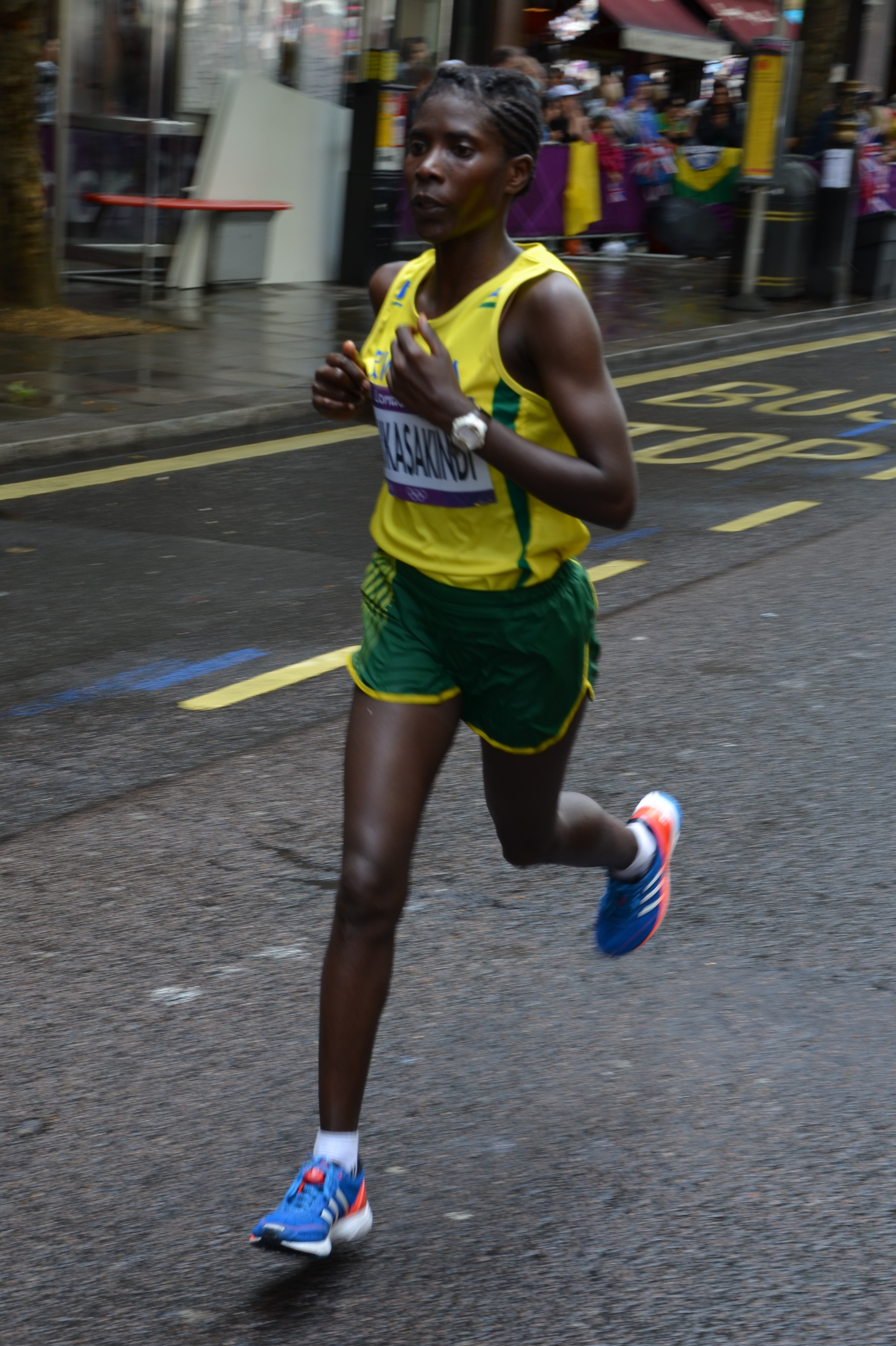
Claudette Mukasakindi representing Rwanda in the women's marathon at the 2012 Summer Olympics in London

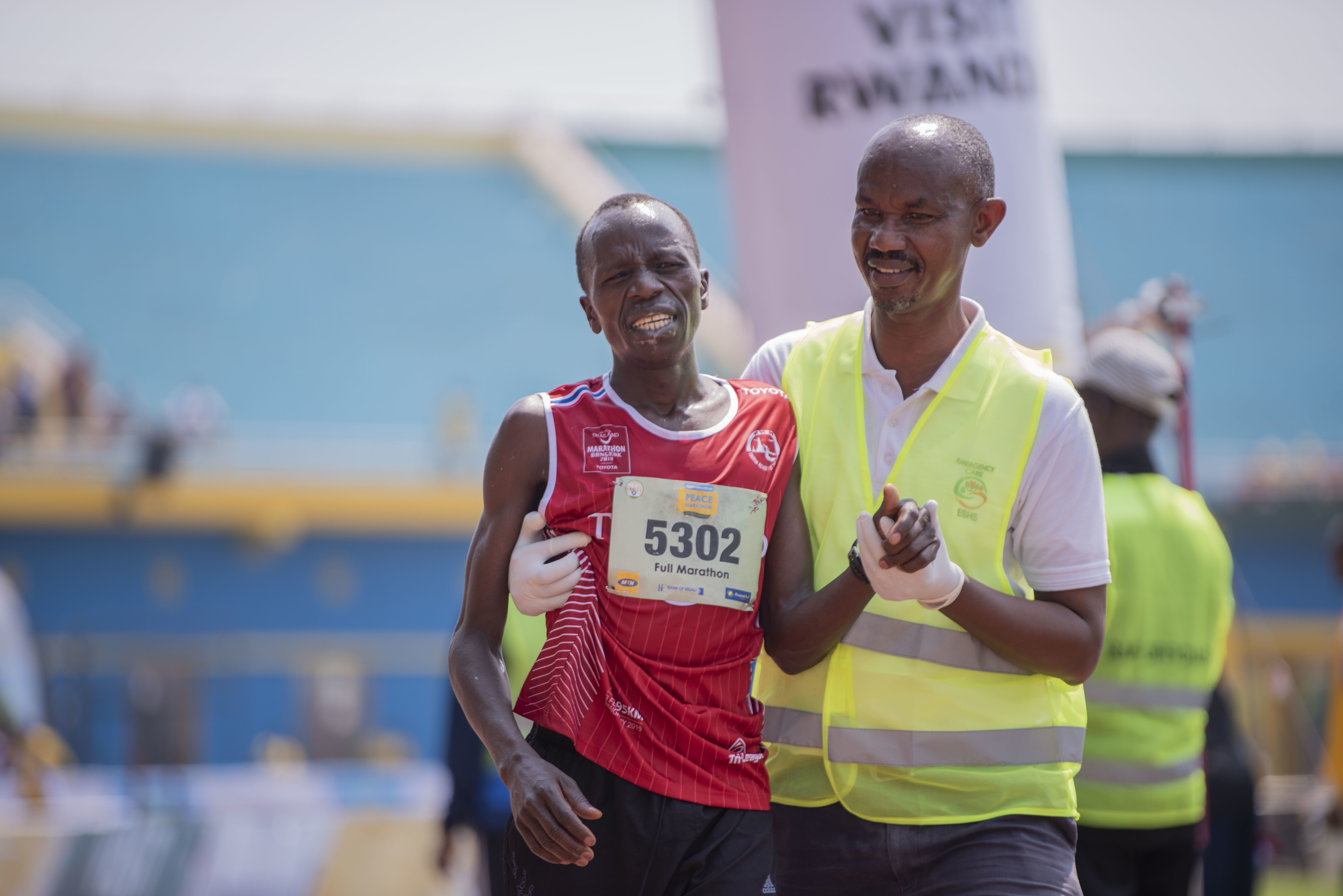
Medical personnel attending to an injured runner during the Kigali Peace Marathon

Sport plays a valued role in Rwanda, especially at a communal level, with football being a popular pastime and children playing informally in villages, towns and schools. Sport is also supported by the government's Sports Development Policy of October 2012. This argues that sport has a number of benefits, including bringing people together, improving national pride and unity, and improving health. The policy identifies challenges to the development of sport in the country, including limited infrastructure and financial capacity. It sets the "inspirational target" that, by 2020, Rwanda should have "a higher percentage of population playing sport than in any other African nation" and be ranked amongst the top three African countries in basketball, volleyball, cycling, athletics and Paralympic sports, and the top ten in football. It also aims to "foster increased participation of people in traditional sports". According to research published by the University of the Western Cape's Interdisciplinary Centre of Excellence for Sport Science and Development, the most popular sports in Rwanda are association football, volleyball, basketball, athletics and Paralympic sports.

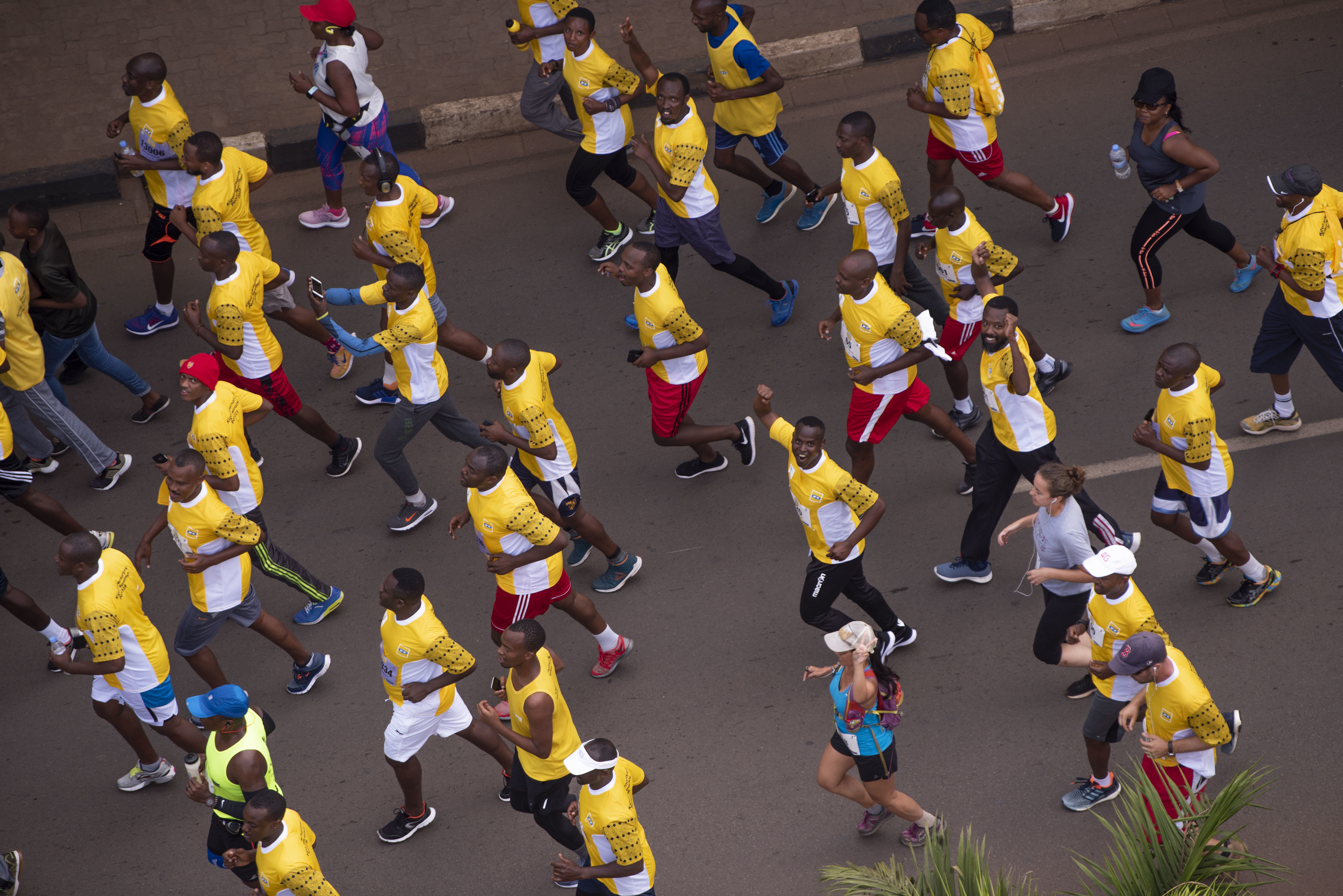
Aerial view of the Kigali Peace Marathon

== Overview ==
Rwanda's first appearance at the Olympic Games was in 1984, and its first appearance at the Paralympic Games in 2004. The country sent seven competitors to the 2012 Summer Olympics in London, representing it in athletics, swimming, mountain biking and judo, and 15 competitors to the London Summer Paralympics to compete in athletics, powerlifting and sitting volleyball. Rwanda competed in the Commonwealth Games for the first time at the 2010 Games in Delhi, India, after joining the Commonwealth the year before. Rwandan competitors took part in athletics, boxing, road cycling and swimming. Rwanda sent athletes to the 2014 Games to compete in athletics, boxing, cycling, swimming and weightlifting. Rwanda's team at the 2014 African Youth Games had the highest proportion of female athletes (29 out of a total of 49 athletes) of any participating country.

=== Basketball ===
Basketball is among the most popular sports in Rwanda, second only to association football and by far the most watched indoor sport in the country. Rwanda's basketball federation has been a member of the International Basketball Federation since 1977. Prior to 2000, the Rwanda national basketball team was little known outside the country, but since the mid-2000s has grown in prominence on the African stage. The men's team have qualified for the final stages of the African Basketball Championship four times in a row since 2007. The country bid to host the 2013 African Basketball Championship, but the right to host the tournament was awarded to Ivory Coast instead.

The AfroBasket 2021 was awarded to Kigali. On home soil, Rwanda beat Angola, winner of 10 AfroBasket editions between 1989 and 2013. Rwanda's Alex Mpoyo stated:

"It is good to see that our work to best represent our country is appreciated so much. Honestly, I cannot thank enough the thousands of fans who came to cheer us on, with their songs and dances throughout the game, even when we were behind. Their unconditional support has been a tremendous source of motivation for us."

=== Football ===
Association football in Rwanda is governed by the Rwandese Association Football Federation (FERWAFA), which was established in 1972 and admitted to FIFA in 1978. FERWAFA is also affiliated to the Confederation of African Football (CAF) and the Council for East and Central Africa Football Associations (CECAFA). Its national team made its African Cup of Nations debut in the 2004 edition of the tournament. A Rwanda B team won the CECAFA Cup in 1999, when the country hosted the tournament. The CECAFA Club Cup has been known as the Kagame Interclub Cup since 2002, when Rwandan President Kagame started to sponsor the competition. The national team is yet to qualify for the World Cup. Rwanda's highest domestic football competition is the Rwanda National Football League.

=== Beach volleyball ===
Rwanda has national men's and women's beach volleyball teams. In June 2021, head coach for both squads was Jean Paul Mana, who guided them through training sessions at Lake Kivu Beach in the Rubavu District.

At the 2018–2020 CAVB Beach Volleyball Continental Cup Rwanda was represented by two teams in the women's section who were Charlotte Nzayisenga and Valentine Munezero, as well as Benitha Mukandayisenga and Seraphine Mukantabana. The male players were Olivier Ntagengwa, Patrick Kavalo Akumuntu, Venuste Gatsinze and Fils Habanzintwari.

=== Cricket ===
Cricket has been described as one of the fastest growing sports in Rwanda. The sport started to gain popularity in the country as refugees returned from Kenya, where they had learned to play the game. The Rwanda Cricket Association (RCA) was established in 1999 and recognised by the International Cricket Council in 2003. Development of the sport in the country has been supported by the UK-based charity Cricket Without Boundaries, which aims to improve HIV/AIDS awareness through the game, and by the Marylebone Cricket Club Foundation. The latter is backing a project to construct a national cricket field on the outskirts of Kigali. Rwanda's membership of the Commonwealth has been credited with helping popularise cricket in the country, with both men and women playing it in orphanages, schools, universities and cricket clubs.

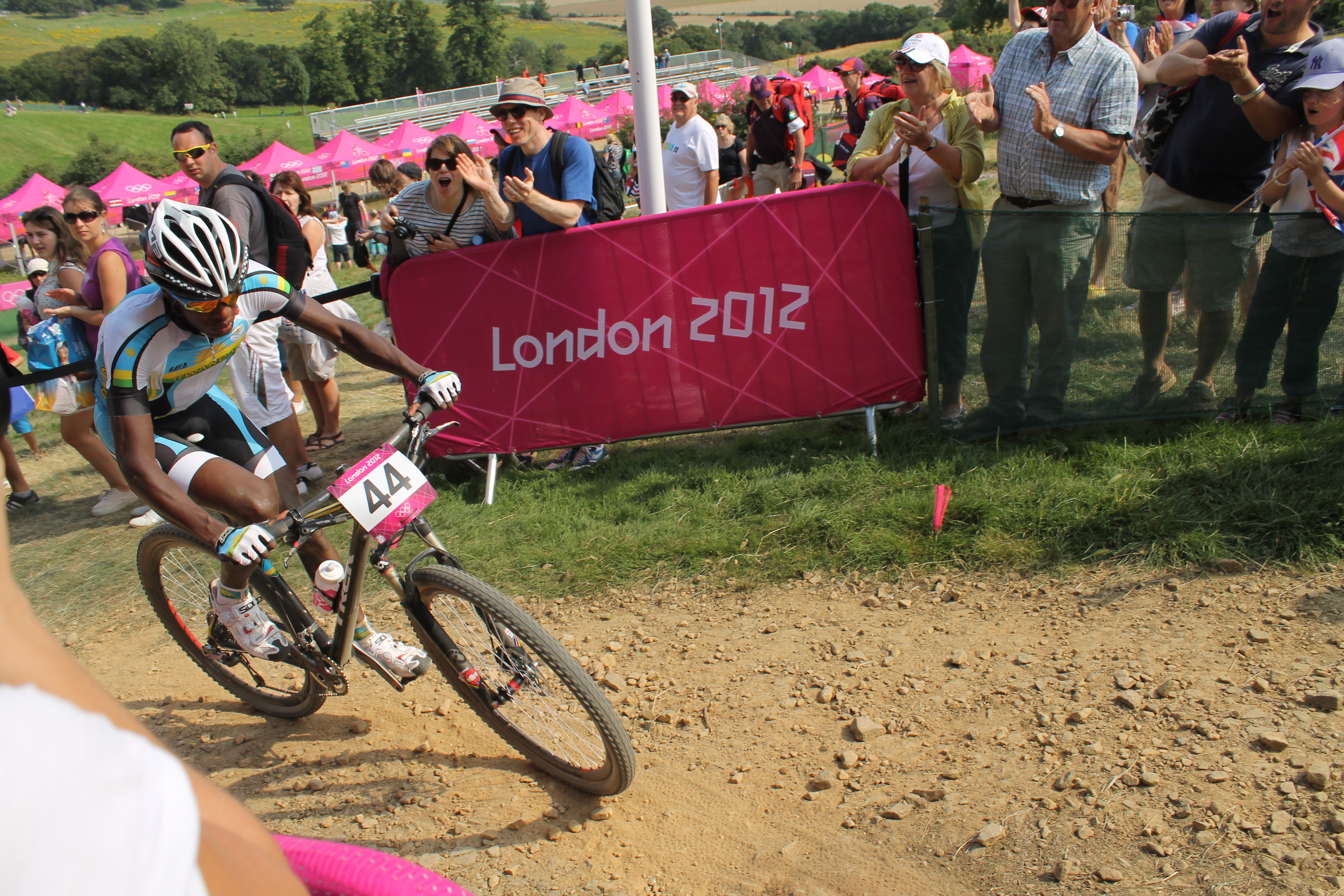
Adrien Niyonshuti, "one of the most famous people in Rwanda", competing in the cross-country mountain biking event at the 2012 Summer Olympics

=== Cycling ===
Cycling has traditionally been seen largely as a mode of transport in Rwanda, but in recent times there has been a growth in cycle sport in the country. Mountain biker and road cyclist Adrien Niyonshuti became the first Rwandan to sign a professional contract with an international cycling team, joining MTN Qhubeka in 2009. A national cycling team, Team Rwanda, was established in 2007 by Americans Jock Boyer, a former professional cyclist, and Tom Ritchey, a bicycle entrepreneur. Team Rwanda have been the subject of a book, Land of Second Chances: The Impossible Rise of Rwanda's Cycling Team and a film, Rising from Ashes. The Tour of Rwanda was first held in 1988. Prior to 2009, it was contested mainly by local riders and cyclists from neighbouring countries, but in late 2008 it was sanctioned by the Union Cycliste Internationale and since 2009 has been included in the UCI Africa Tour.

The UCI Road World Championships took place in Kigali in September 2025.

=== Motorsport ===
It was announced in October 2026 that Formula One would host the African Grand Prix in Bugesera.

== Social role of sport ==
Sport is seen by some as a means of achieving post-conflict reconciliation in Rwanda, and a number of organisations are involved in using sport to promote reconciliation. The country's Sports Development Policy includes amongst its aims promotion of "the use of sports as strong avenue for development and peace building", and the government has made commitments to advancing the use of sport for a variety of other development objectives, including education.
