= 1966 South African Grand Prix =

- Non-championship race in the 1966 Formula One season

Race details
- Date: 1 January 1966
- Official name: 12th International RAC Grand Prix of South Africa
- Location: Prince George Circuit, East London, South Africa
- Course: Temporary road circuit
- Course length: 3.91 km (2.436 miles)
- Distance: 60 laps, 234.592 km (145.769 miles)

Pole position
Driver	(Australia) Jack Brabham	Brabham-Repco
- Time: 1:25.1

Fastest lap
Driver	(Australia) Jack Brabham	Brabham-Repco
- Time: 1:25.2

Podium
First	(United Kingdom) Mike Spence	Lotus-Climax
Second	(Switzerland) Jo Siffert	Brabham-BRM
Third	(United Kingdom) Peter Arundell	Lotus-Climax

The 1966 South African Grand Prix, formally titled the 12th International RAC Grand Prix of South Africa (Afrikaans: 12de Internasionale RAC Grand Prix van Suid-Afrika), was a non-championship Formula One motor race held on 1 January 1966 at Prince George Circuit, East London, South Africa. The race, run over 60 laps of the circuit, was won by British driver Mike Spence in a works Lotus-Climax. Spence won by two laps from the private Brabham-BRM of Swiss driver Jo Siffert, with fellow Briton Peter Arundell third in the other works Lotus-Climax. The Grand Prix in South Africa had been relegated to non-championship status for 1966 as cars with 1.5 litre engines had been permitted to enter the race against 1966 World Championship regulations which only permitted teams to use cars with 3 litre engines.

== Results ==
Pos	Driver	Entrant	Constructor	Laps	Time/Retired	Grid
1	(United Kingdom) Mike Spence	Team Lotus	Lotus-Climax	60	1.29:39.4	2
2	(Switzerland) Jo Siffert	Rob Walker Racing Team	Brabham-BRM	58	+ 2 Laps	12
3	(United Kingdom) Peter Arundell	Team Lotus	Lotus-Climax	58	+ 2 Laps	13
4	(South Africa) Dave Charlton	Scuderia Scribante	Brabham-Climax	58	+ 2 Laps	10
DSQ	(United Kingdom) Bob Anderson	DW Racing Enterprises	Brabham-Climax	58	Push Start	8
5	(Rhodesia) Sam Tingle	Sam Tingle	LDS-Climax	57	+ 3 Laps	14
6	(Rhodesia) John Love	John Love	Cooper-Climax	56	+ 4 Laps	4
7	(Rhodesia) Clive Puzey	Clive Puzey Motors	Lotus-Climax	56	+ 4 Laps	18
8	(South Africa) Tony Jefferies	John Love	Cooper-Climax	56	+ 4 Laps	15
9	(South Africa) Jackie Pretorius	Scuderia Scribante	Lotus-Climax	56	+ 4 Laps	17
10	(South Africa) Doug Serrurier	Louis Douglas Serrurier	LDS-Climax	55	+ 5 Laps	16
Ret	(Australia) Jack Brabham	Brabham Racing Organisation	Brabham-Repco	49	Fuel Injection	1
Ret	(South Africa) Peter de Klerk	Otelle Nucci	Brabham-Climax	49	Gearbox	7
Ret	(New Zealand) Denny Hulme	Brabham Racing Organisation	Brabham-Climax	46	Gearbox	3
Ret	(United Kingdom) Innes Ireland	Reg Parnell (Racing)	Lotus-BRM	33	Gearbox	5
Ret	(Australia) Paul Hawkins	Reg Parnell (Racing)	Lotus-Climax	9	Gear Selector	11
Ret	(United States) Richie Ginther	Stirling Moss Racing Team	BRP-BRM	8	Accident	6
Ret	(Sweden) Jo Bonnier	Rob Walker Racing Team	Lotus-Climax	7	Accident	9
Ret	(United Kingdom) David Prophet	David Prophet Racing	Lotus-Maserati	0	Driveshaft	19
DNS	(South Africa) Brian Raubenheimer	Brian Raubenheimer	Lotus-Ford			
DNS	(South Africa) Jack Holme	Jack Holme	LDS-Ford			
DNS	(South Africa) David Hume	Team Valencia	LDS-Climax			

Previous race: 1965 Rand Grand Prix	Formula One non-championship races 1966 season	Next race: 1966 Syracuse Grand Prix
Previous race: 1965 South African Grand Prix	South African Grand Prix	Next race: 1967 South African Grand Prix
