= Tourism minister =

The Minister of Tourism is the head of the governmental department that specializes in tourism, recreation and/or culture.

The position exists in many countries under several names:

- Ministry of Tourism and Environment (Albania)
- Ministry of Tourism and Sports (Argentina)
- Minister for Tourism (Australia)
  - Minister for Tourism (Victoria)
  - Minister for Tourism, Major Events, Hospitality and Racing (New South Wales)
  - Minister for Tourism (Western Australia)
- Ministry of Civil Aviation and Tourism (Bangladesh)
- Ministry of Tourism (Brazil)
- Ministry of Environment and Tourism (Botswana)
- Ministry of Primary Resources and Tourism (Brunei)
- Bahamas Ministry of Tourism
- Minister of Tourism (Canada)
  - Ministry of Tourism and Recreation (Ontario) (former ministry)
  - Ministry of Tourism and Culture (Ontario)
- Ministry of Tourism (Croatia)
- Minister of Tourism (France)
- Minister of Tourism (Greece)
- Commissioner for Tourism (Hong Kong)
- Ministry of Education, Science and Culture (Iceland)
- Ministry of Tourism (India)
- Ministry of Tourism and Creative Economy (Indonesia)
- Ministry of Cultural Heritage, Handicrafts and Tourism (Iran)
- Minister for Enterprise, Tourism and Employment (Ireland)
- Ministry of Culture, Sports and Tourism (South Korea)
- Ministry of Tourism (Lebanon)
- Minister of Tourism (Malaysia)
- Ministry of Hotels and Tourism (Myanmar)
- Minister of Culture, Tourism and Civil Aviation (Nepal)
- Ministry of Tourism (Pakistan)
- Ministry of Foreign Commerce and Tourism (Peru)
- Department of Tourism (Philippines)
- Tourism Minister of Israel
- Ministry of Tourism (Mauritius)
- Minister of Tourism (New Zealand)
- Rivers State Ministry of Culture and Tourism
- Ministry of Tourism (Pakistan)
- Minister of Tourism (South Africa)
- Ministry of Tourism (Syria)
- Ministry of Natural Resources and Tourism (Tanzania)
- Ministry of Tourism and Sports (Thailand)
- Ministry of Culture and Tourism (Turkey)
- Minister for Tourism and Heritage (United Kingdom)
- Parliamentary Under Secretary of State for Arts, Heritage and Tourism (United Kingdom)
- United States Department of Commerce
- Ministry of Culture, Sports and Tourism (Vietnam)
- Ministry of Tourism and Arts (Zambia)
- Ministry of Tourism (Zimbabwe)

== See also ==
- Ministry of Culture and Tourism (disambiguation)
- Secretary of Tourism (disambiguation)
