= Secretary of Tourism =

Secretary of Tourism may refer to:

- Secretary of Tourism (Dominican Republic); see Cabinet of the Dominican Republic
- Secretary of Tourism (Mexico)
- Secretary of Tourism (Philippines)

== See also ==
- Tourism minister
