= Mario Mazzacurati =

Italian racing driver (1903–1985)

Mario Mazzacurati (21 October 1903 – 17 April 1985) was an Italian engineer and racing driver active in South Africa with the pseudonym Mario Massacuratti. He won the 1936 South African Grand Prix and participated in a number of other events.

== Biography ==
Mazzacurati was born in Piove di Sacco, Padua , Italy on 21 October 1903. He studied for a degree in geology at the University of Bologna and became a civil engineer.

Mazzacurati participated in the 1929 and 1930 Mille Miglia in a Bugatti Type 35, with Amedeo Bignami as co-driver, but did not finish in either. He also retired from the 1929 Circuito di Bordino.

Around 1930, Mazzacurati moved to South Africa for civil engineering work, which included building Hout Bay Harbour in Cape Town and country roads. He was also involved in tin mining in Swaziland. In 1935, he established a European racing car dealership, the "Eagle Racing Stable", in Cape Town, which imported many racing cars to South Africa. Imports included the Bugatti T35B and T35C, Alfa Romeo Monza and the Maserati 6C-34. Some of these purchases included cars formerly owned by Tazio Nuvolari.

Mazzacurati continued his racing in South Africa, achieving good results in local events, including a victory at the South African Grand Prix in 1936 and third places in the 1937 and 1939 races. He raced under the pseudonym "Mario" and often his Italian surname was modified from Mazzacurati to Massacuratti.

As an Italian, at the outbreak of World War II, Mazzacurati was interned in a prisoner camp in South Africa. He made many attempts to escape. At the end of hostilities, he returned to Italy and made his final race in the 1954 Mille Miglia in a Fiat 500C with Arturo Giacomelli, before retiring.

He died in Rome on 17 April 1985 at the age of 81. His son was Carlo Mazzacurati, film director and screenwriter.
