= Tilke =

Tilke is a surname. Notable people with the surname include:

- Hermann Tilke (born 1954), German automotive engineer and racing driver
- Max Karl Tilke (1869–1942), German artist and ethnographer
