= Culture minister =

Minister in a government with responsibility for cultural affairs

A culture minister or a heritage minister is a common cabinet position in governments. The culture minister is typically responsible for cultural policy, which often includes arts policy (direct and indirect support to artists and arts organizations) and measures to protect the national heritage of a country and cultural expression of a country or subnational region. This responsibility usually manifests in the accompanying ministry (also called a "department"), governing the following:

- an official registry of protected historic sites and other sites of cultural importance
- maintaining national archives of cultural work, including public museums, galleries and libraries
- creating a department or ministry of culture or arts
- creating arts councils, which disburse funding to artists and arts organization
- providing funding and other forms of support to artists and arts institutions.

In some countries or subnational jurisdictions (e.g., provinces, regions, Länder), the minister of culture may also be responsible for sport, youth issues, or tourism (e.g., in Turkey). In a few cases, the minister of culture is also responsible for foreign affairs (e.g., in Scotland), education (e.g., Hungary, Iceland, Indonesia), science and technology policy (e.g., Japan), communications/media (Singapore, UK), or a geographical area associated with national heritage (e.g., Ireland).

== Terminology ==
A culture minister may also be called a cultural minister, minister of culture, minister of cultural affairs, minister of arts, minister of heritage, secretary of culture or secretary of state of culture.

== See also ==
- Ministry of Culture
- Ministry of Education and Culture
- Minister (government)
