= Prince George Circuit =

Motorsport track in East London, South Africa

- Location: East London, South Africa
- Coordinates: 33°02′55″S 27°52′25″E
- Operator: Border Motorsport Club
- Major events: Grand Prix / Formula Libre / Formula One; South African Grand Prix (1934, 1936–1939, 1960–1963, 1965–1966)

Grand Prix Circuit (1959–present)
- Length: 3.920 km (2.436 mi)
- Turns: 9
- Race lap record: 1:24.300 ( (Rhodesia) John Love, Lotus 49, 1968, SA F1)

Modified Circuit (1936–1939)
- Length: 18.619 km (11.569 mi)

Original Circuit (1934)
- Length: 24.461 km (15.199 mi)

Prince George Circuit is a race circuit in East London in Eastern Cape Province, South Africa. On this course the South African Grand Prix was hosted in 1934, and 1936 to 1939 when racing was halted due to World War II, and then in 1960–1966.

== Course layout ==
The original circuit was 24.461 km (15.199 mi) long and was run on streets through different populated areas. The start and finish straight ran along the sea shore. After three fast corners the course followed a road – which is now called Molteno Drive – that would later also be part of the shorter new circuit. Moving further east the course entered the West Bank Village on Strand Street before turning north onto Bank Street and then west on Military Road. There the track moved through the areas Fort Glamorgan and Gately. Military Road changed into Settlers Way at the height of Woodbrook and Greenfields. After driving through what is now the East London Airport (not built at the time), the course turned south at the far west point onto Prince George Street and led with a relatively long series of twisty turns and one hairpin at the end back to the main straight.

The circuit was shortened to 18.619 km (11.569 mi) in 1936. Instead of taking Molteno Drive east, the course followed Potters Pass north to get back onto the original circuit at the begin of Settlers Way.

Modified to meet Formula One regulations in 1959, the track was built into a seaside amphitheatre with a length of 3.920 km (2.436 mi). It hosted three rounds of the F1 South African Grand Prix in the 1960s. It was later deemed too small for Formula One cars, and the race was moved to Kyalami.

== Layout history ==
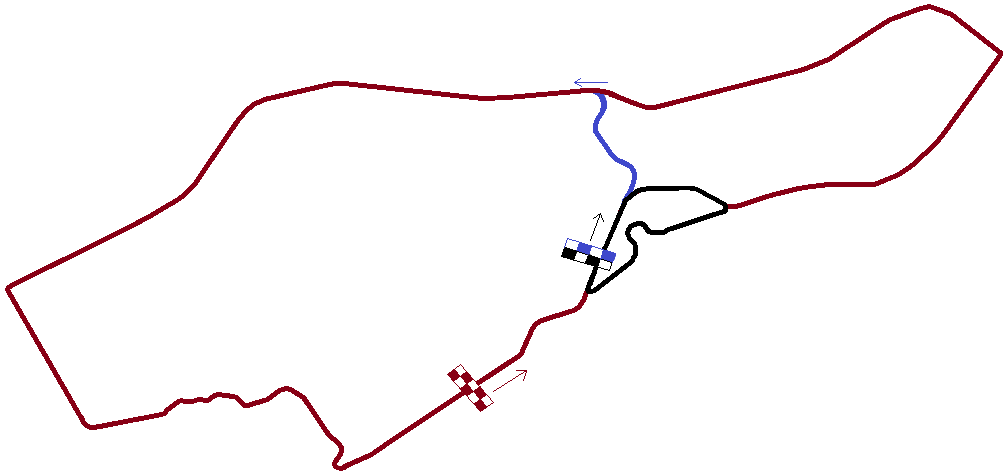
Layout of all versions of the Prince George Circuit
Brown = 1934, Blue = 1936, Black = 1959

Prince George Circuit (1934)

Prince George Circuit (1936–1939)

Prince George Circuit (1959–present)

== Lap records ==
As of August 2022, the fastest official race lap records at the Prince George Circuit are listed as:

Category	Time	Driver	Vehicle	Event
Grand Prix Circuit (1959–present): 3.920 km (2.436 mi)
South Africa F1	1:24.300	John Love	Lotus 49	1968 Border 100
Formula One	1:25.200	Jack Brabham	Brabham BT19	1966 South African Grand Prix
GTC	1:25.502	Saood Wariawa	Toyota Corolla (E210)	2022 East London Global Touring Car Championship round
SupaCup	1:28.462	Jeffrey Kruger	Volkswagen Polo VI	2022 East London Global Touring Car Championship round
