= Formula One sponsorship liveries =

Formula One sponsorship liveries have been used since the 1968 season. Before the arrival of sponsorship liveries in 1968, the nationality of the team determined the colour of a car entered by the team, e.g. cars entered by Italian teams were rosso corsa red, cars entered by French teams were bleu de France blue, and cars entered by British teams (with several exceptions, such as cars entered by teams Rob Walker, Brabham, and McLaren) were British racing green. Major sponsors such as BP, Shell, and Firestone had pulled out of the sport ahead of this season, prompting the Fédération Internationale de l'Automobile to allow unrestricted sponsorship.

Team Gunston became the first Formula One team to implement sponsorship brands as a livery on their Brabham car, which privately entered for John Love in orange, brown and gold colours of Gunston cigarettes in the first race of the 1968 season, the 1968 South African Grand Prix, on 1 January, 1968. In the next race, the 1968 Spanish Grand Prix, Team Lotus, initially using British racing green, became the first works team to follow this example, with Graham Hill's Lotus 49B entered in the red, gold and white colors of Imperial Tobacco's Gold Leaf brand. With rising costs in Formula One, sponsors became more important and thus liveries reflected the teams' sponsors.

Tobacco advertising was common in motorsport for decades; as bans spread throughout the world during the late 20th and early 21st century, teams began using an alternate livery which alluded to the tobacco sponsor. At historical events, cars are allowed to use the livery which was used when the car was actively competing. Prior to 2022, special liveries were uncommon; excluding country-specific legislation that would require mandatory changes to specific sponsorship elements, most commonly tobacco and nicotine, very few one-off liveries were run in Formula One. The Jaguar team introduced their first one-off livery at the 2004 Monaco Grand Prix, beginning a trend of one-off liveries that continued until the early 2010's. Since then, special liveries were uncommonly seen on track. In 2021, a special livery introduced by McLaren for the Monaco Grand Prix required them to receive special dispensation from the FIA. Since then, the amount of special liveries run by teams on the grid have increased.

== AGS ==
Year	Main colour(s)	Additional colour(s)	Main sponsor(s)	Additional major sponsor(s)	Notes
1986	White		None	Jolly Club, El Charro	
1987	Red, White		El Charro	Acto	
1988	Black	Orange	Tennen	Elf, Bouygues, Facom, Tennen, F.A.T. International	
1989	Black	White	Faure	Camel, Goodyear, LM	
1990	Black	White	Ted Lapidus	Goodyear	
1991	White, Blue	Red, Yellow	Paolo Fiore	Filling, mmta, Goodyear, Bburago	

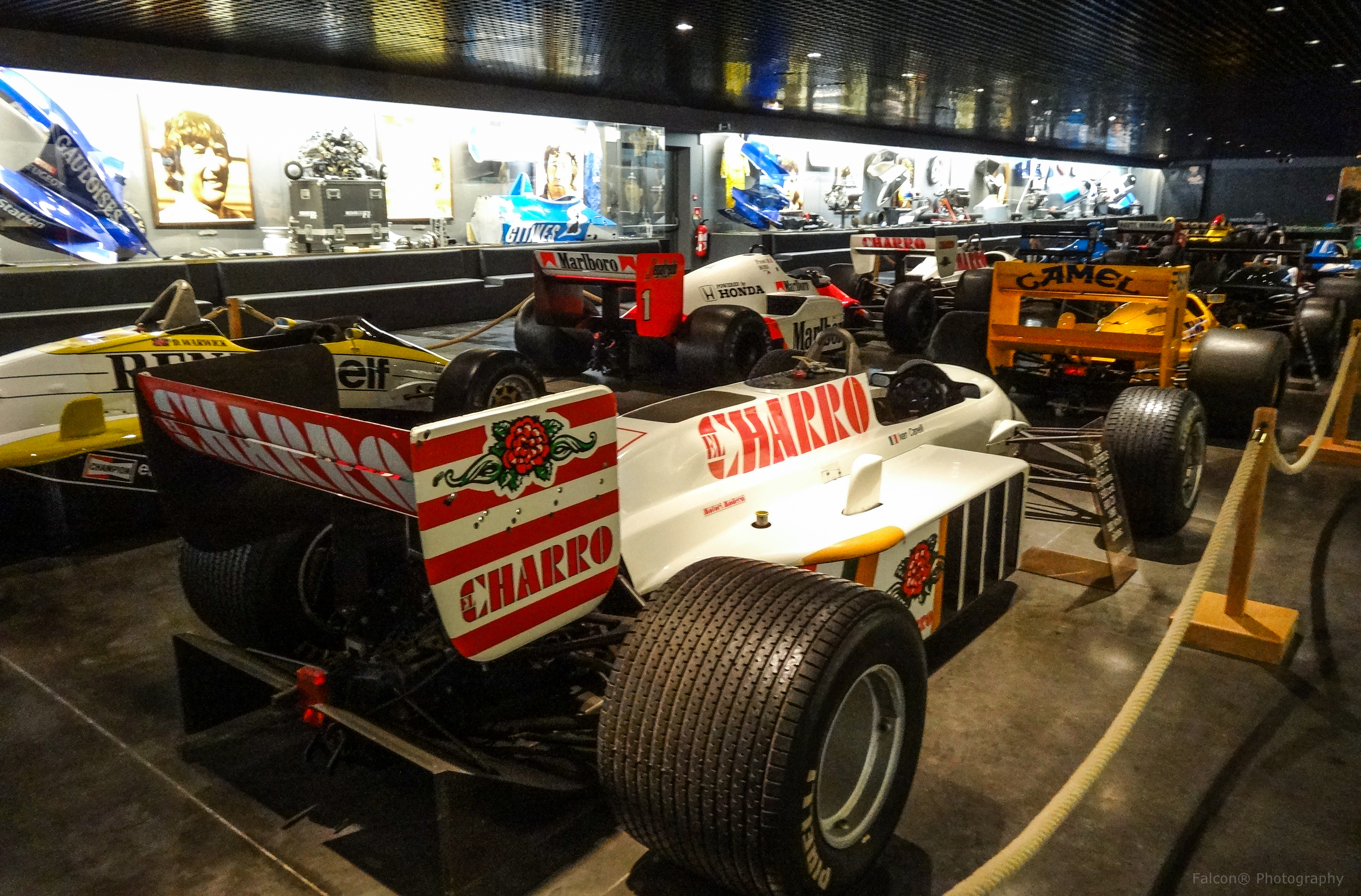
The rear of an AGS JH21C, used during the 1986 Formula One season.

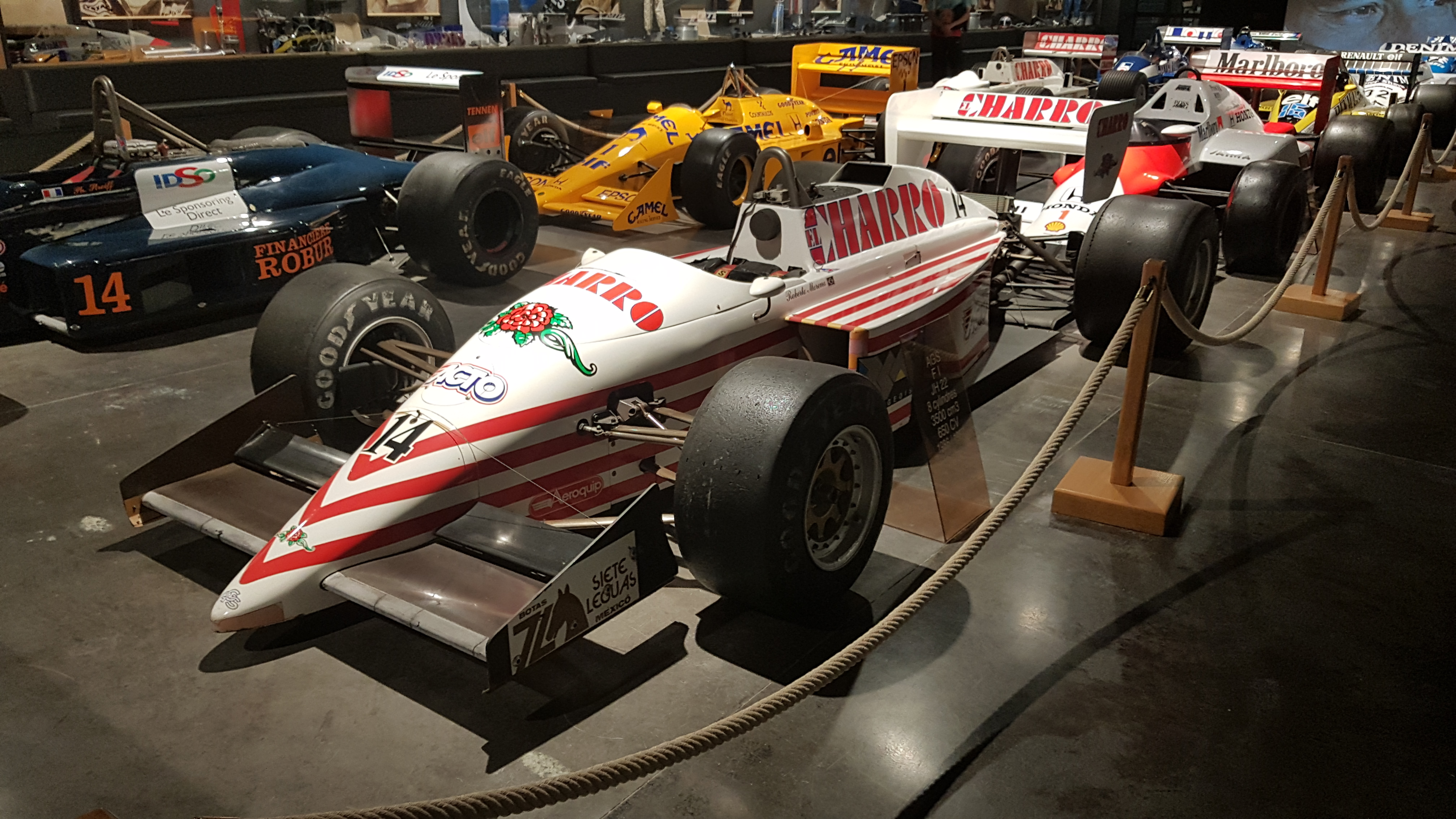
The AGS JH22, used during the 1987 Formula One season.

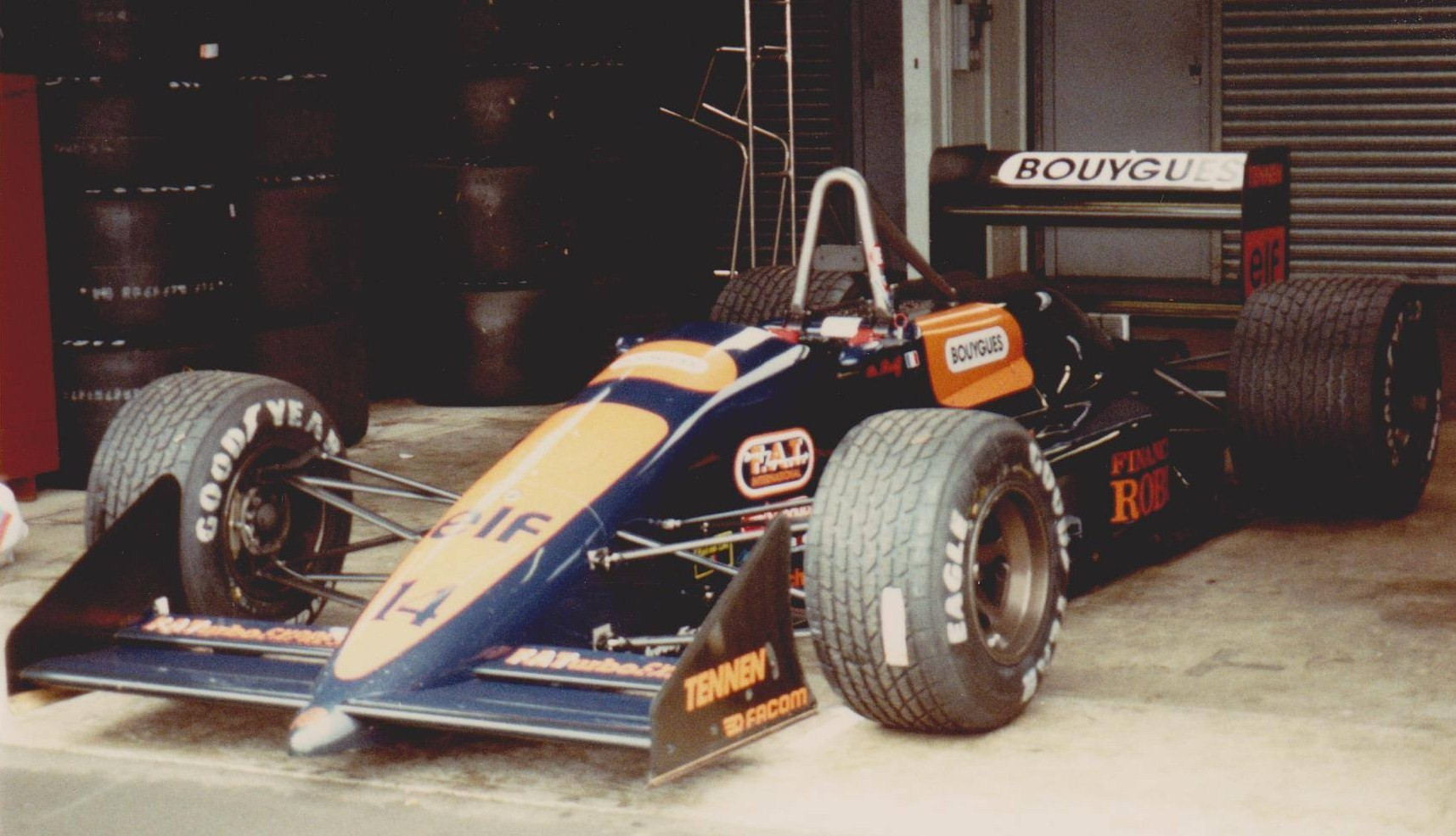
Philippe Streiff's AGS JH23 from the 1988 season at Silverstone

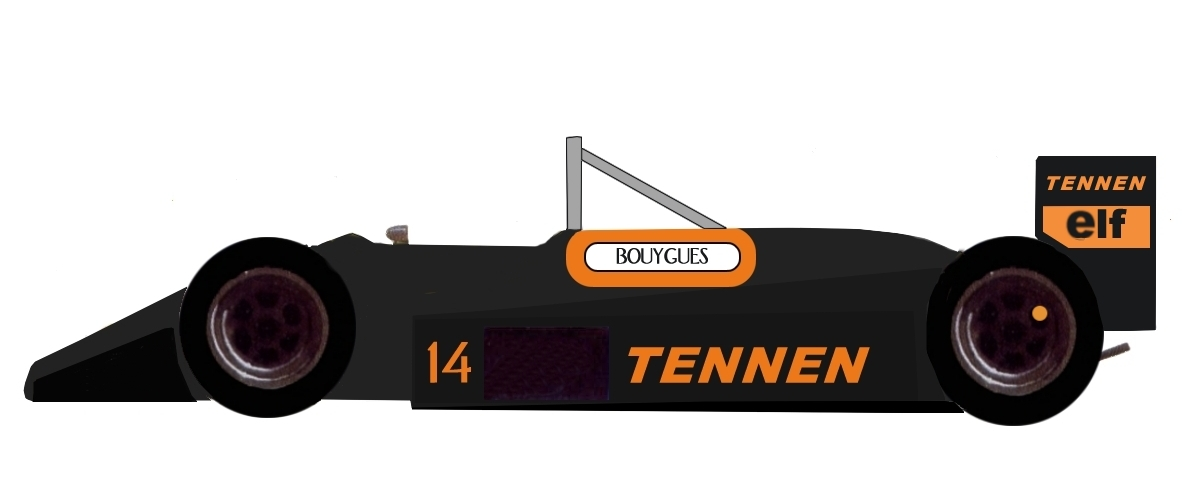
An AGS JH23 from the 1988 Formula One season

== Alfa Romeo ==
Alfa Romeo was a Formula One constructor between 1950 and 1951, and again between 1979 and 1985. In 1950–1951 and 1979, the team used the rosso corsa (racing red) national color of Italy. In 1980, they switched to a livery sponsored by Philip Morris's Marlboro cigarette brand. In 1984, the Italian clothing brand Benetton took over Alfa Romeo's livery sponsorship, which they held until the withdrawal of Alfa Romeo from Formula One at the end of 1985. Alfa Romeo returned as a constructor from 2019 to 2023 with the rebranding of Sauber.

Year	Main colour(s)	Additional colour(s)	Main sponsor(s)	Additional major sponsor(s)	Non-tobacco liveries
1979	Rosso corsa	White		Agip, Magneti Marelli	
1980–1983	Red, White, Black		Marlboro	Champion, Facom, Michelin, Nordica, Agip, Koni, Magneti Marelli	Marlboro logo replaced with a barcode at certain races, due to tobacco or alcohol sponsorship bans.
1984–1985	Green, Red		Benetton Group	Champion, OZ Wheels, Ferodo, Agip, Goodyear, Brembo, Koni, Speedline, Magneti Marelli	
2019	White	Red, Blue	Alfa Romeo	Shell, Singha, Axitea, Carrera, Iveco, Richard Mille, Magneti Marelli, Pirelli, Claro, Adler-Pelzer, Hewlett Packard Enterprise, Betsafe, Little Mole, Singapore Airlines, Sparco, and Huski Chocolate	At the Chinese Grand Prix, an image of the 158 that Giuseppe Farina won the first world championship race was placed on the sidepods
2020	White, Red		Alfa Romeo, PKN Orlen	Singha, Axitea, Carrera, Richard Mille, Magneti Marelli, Pirelli, Additive Industries, Huski Chocolate, Sauber Engineering, Sparco, Hewlett Packard Enterprise, Adler Pelzer Group, Globe Air, Ivy Oxford, AB Dynamics	
2021	White, Red		Alfa Romeo, PKN Orlen	Sauber Engineering, Singha, Carrera, Magneti Marelli, Pirelli, Zadara, Eighty One, Additive Industries, Iqoniq, Sparco, Adler Pelzer Group, AB Dynamics, Code Zero	In Styria, Alfa Romeo used a special 111th anniversary livery. At the home race they have painted a car in Italian tricolor. At the final race in Abu Dhabi, the cars featured messages for their drivers who were both leaving the team at the end of the season; for example, Kimi Räikkönen's is "Dear Kimi, we will leave you alone now", a reference to his famous radio message during the 2012 Abu Dhabi Grand Prix.
2022	Red, White	Black	Alfa Romeo, PKN Orlen	Accelleron, Additive Industries, Adler Pelzer Group, Singha, Zadara, Magneti Marelli, Pirelli, AMX, Camozzi, Sabelt, Puma, Rebellion, Web Eyewear, Hyland, DRF Bets, ZCG	
2023	Red, Black		Alfa Romeo, Stake/Kick	Sauber, Pirelli, Singha, WhistlePig, Magneti Marelli, Grupo Nossa, Everdome, Accelleron, AMX, Cielo, Curam Domi, Camozzi Group, CryptoDATA (Wispr), Rebellion, Web Eyewear, AximTrade, SenseTime, Seagate, Mascot Workwear, CODE-ZERO, Hyland, Corinthian Re, Ambrosial, Fix Network	In countries where advertisement of gambling and sports betting are banned, Stake's branding will be replaced by Kick. Alfa Romeo raced a revised Kick livery called the "disruptive livery" at the Belgian Grand Prix. The team raced a special livery for the Las Vegas Grand Prix featuring “a pattern of playing cards featuring Alfa Romeo's Quadrifoglio in gold and heart suit cards emblazoned with the number six – for the six years of the relationship between Sauber Motorsport and Alfa Romeo.

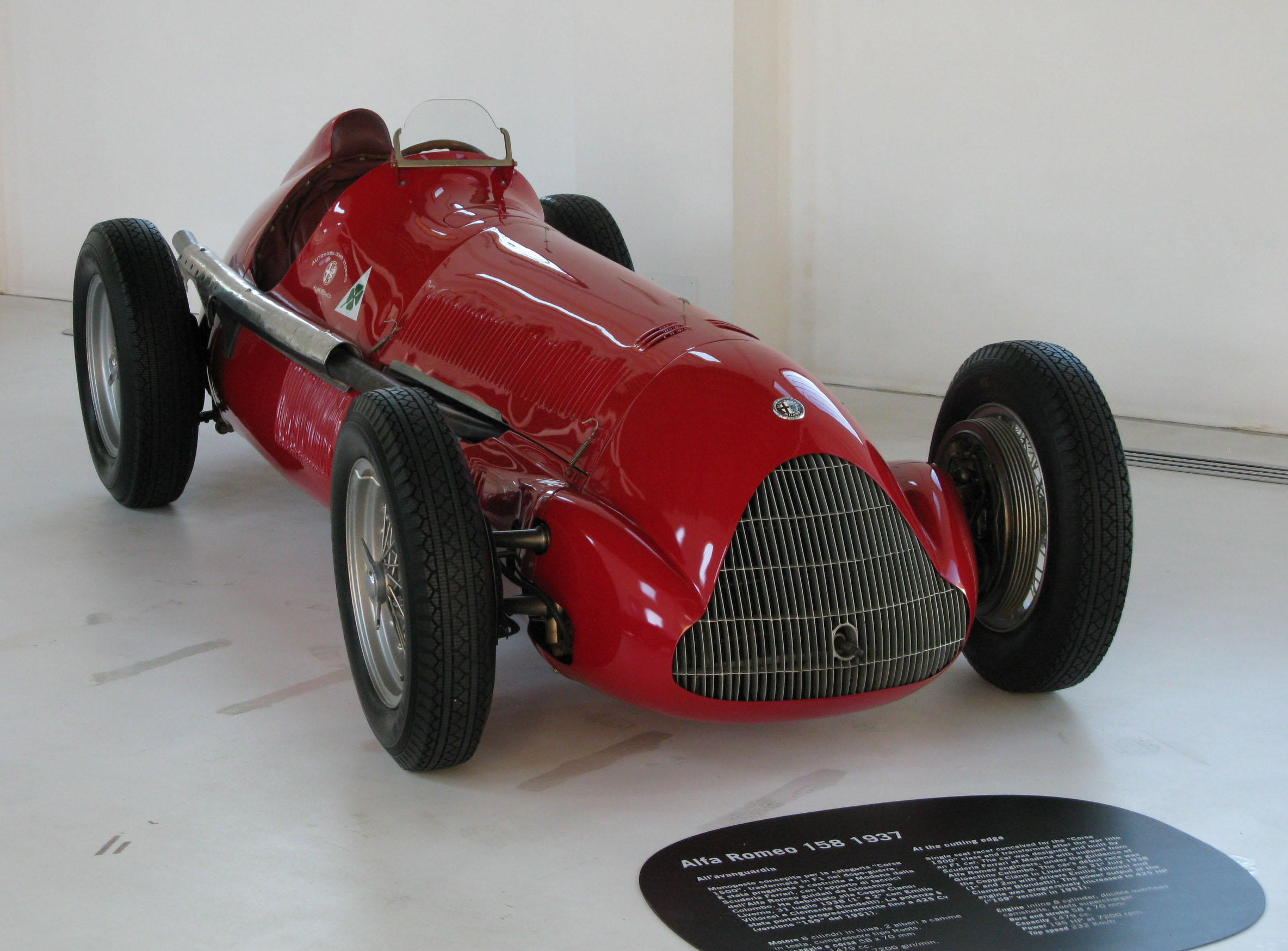
1950: The Alfa Romeo 158.

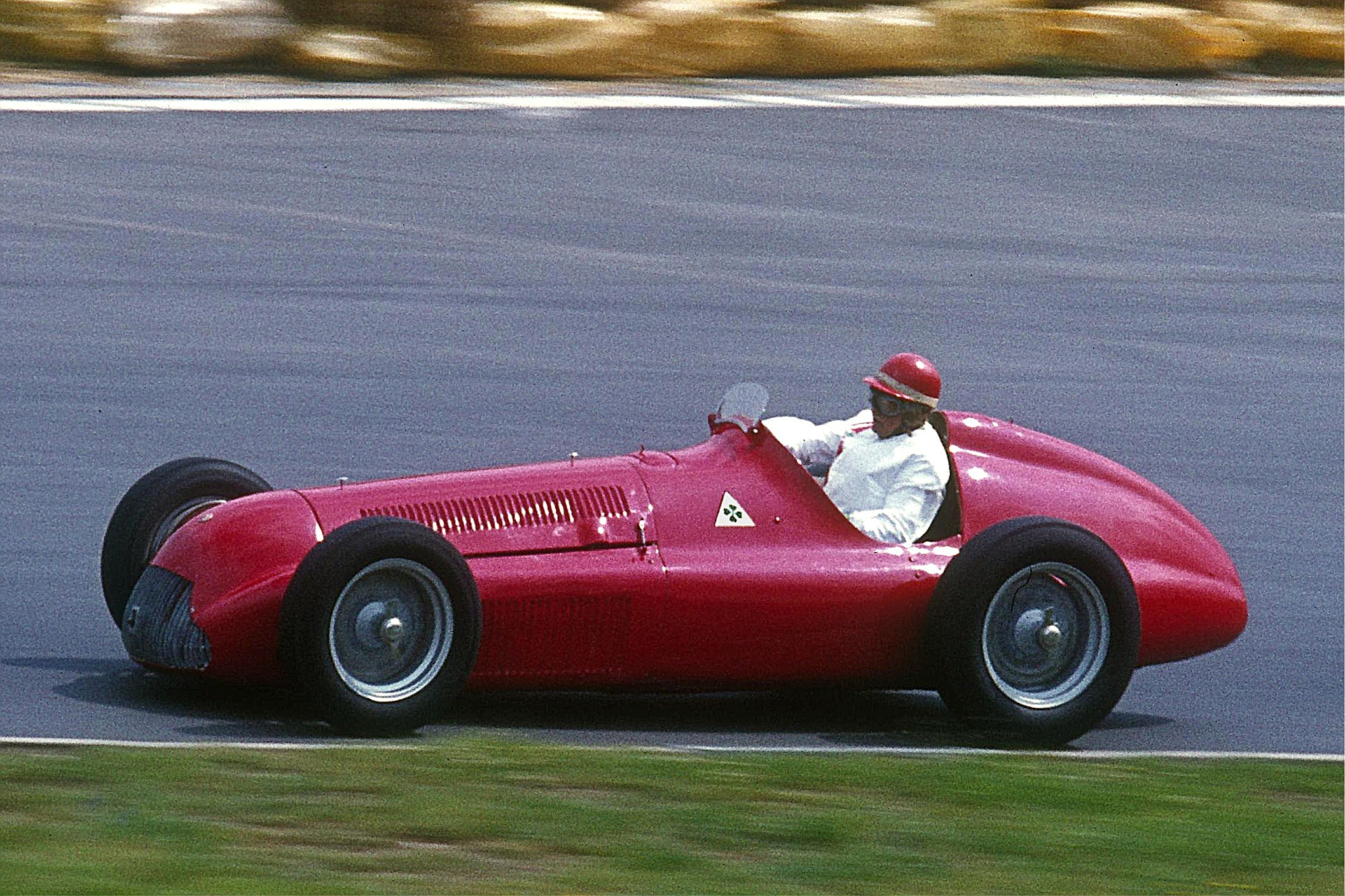
1951: The Alfa Romeo 159 being driven at the Nürburgring.

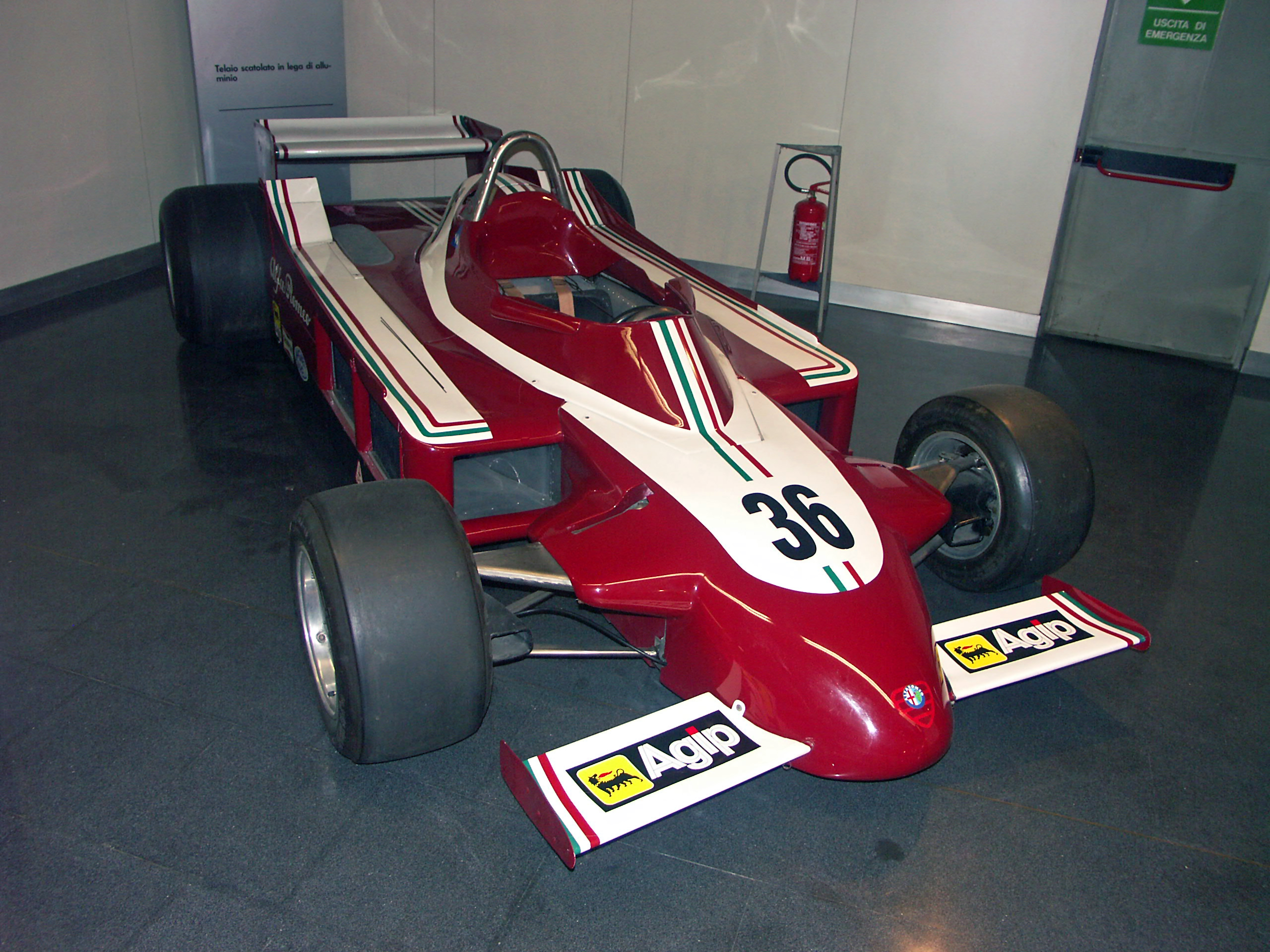
1979: Alfa Romeo returns to Formula One as a constructor.

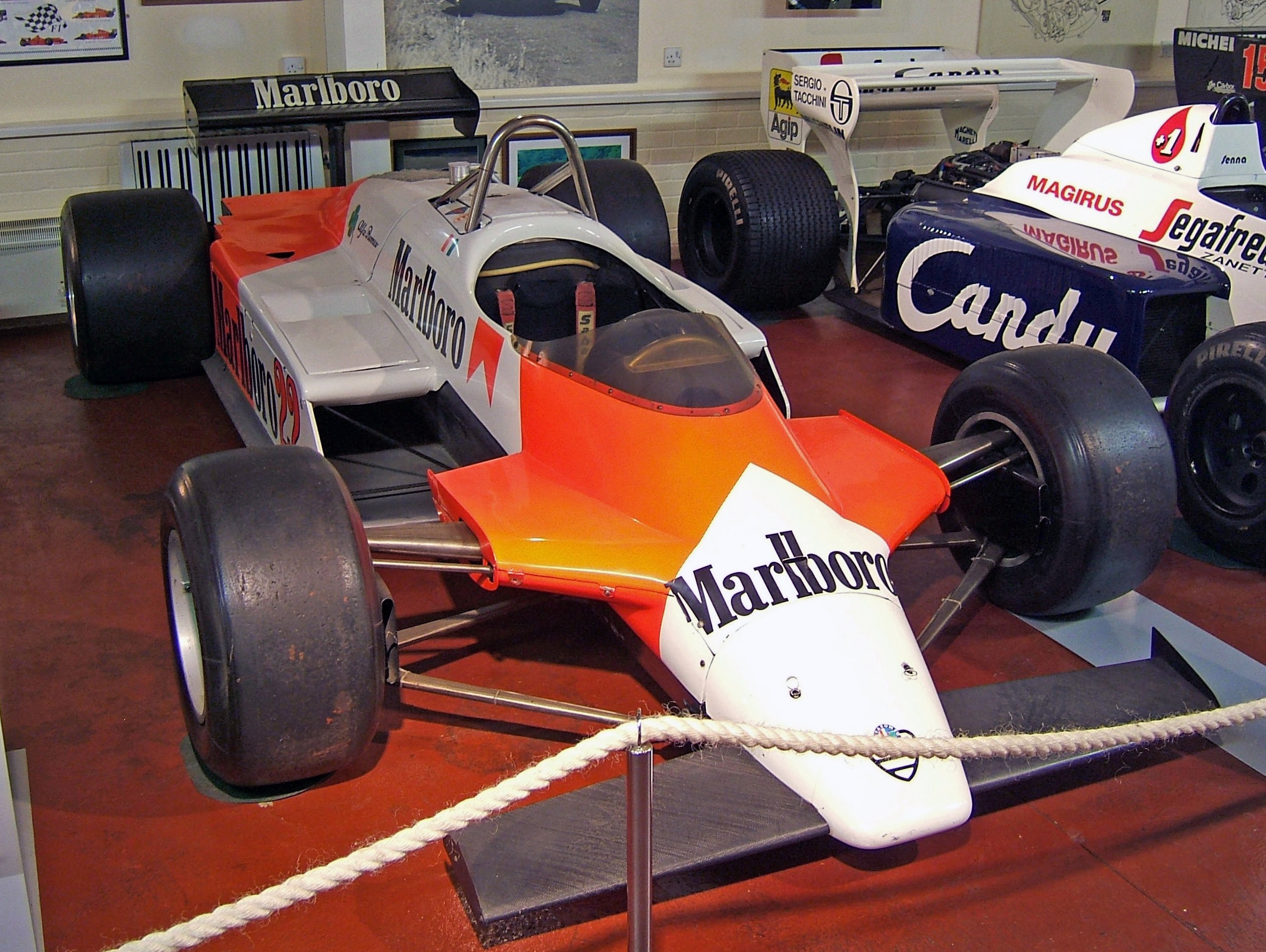
1980: Alfa Romeo appears with Marlboro-sponsored livery.

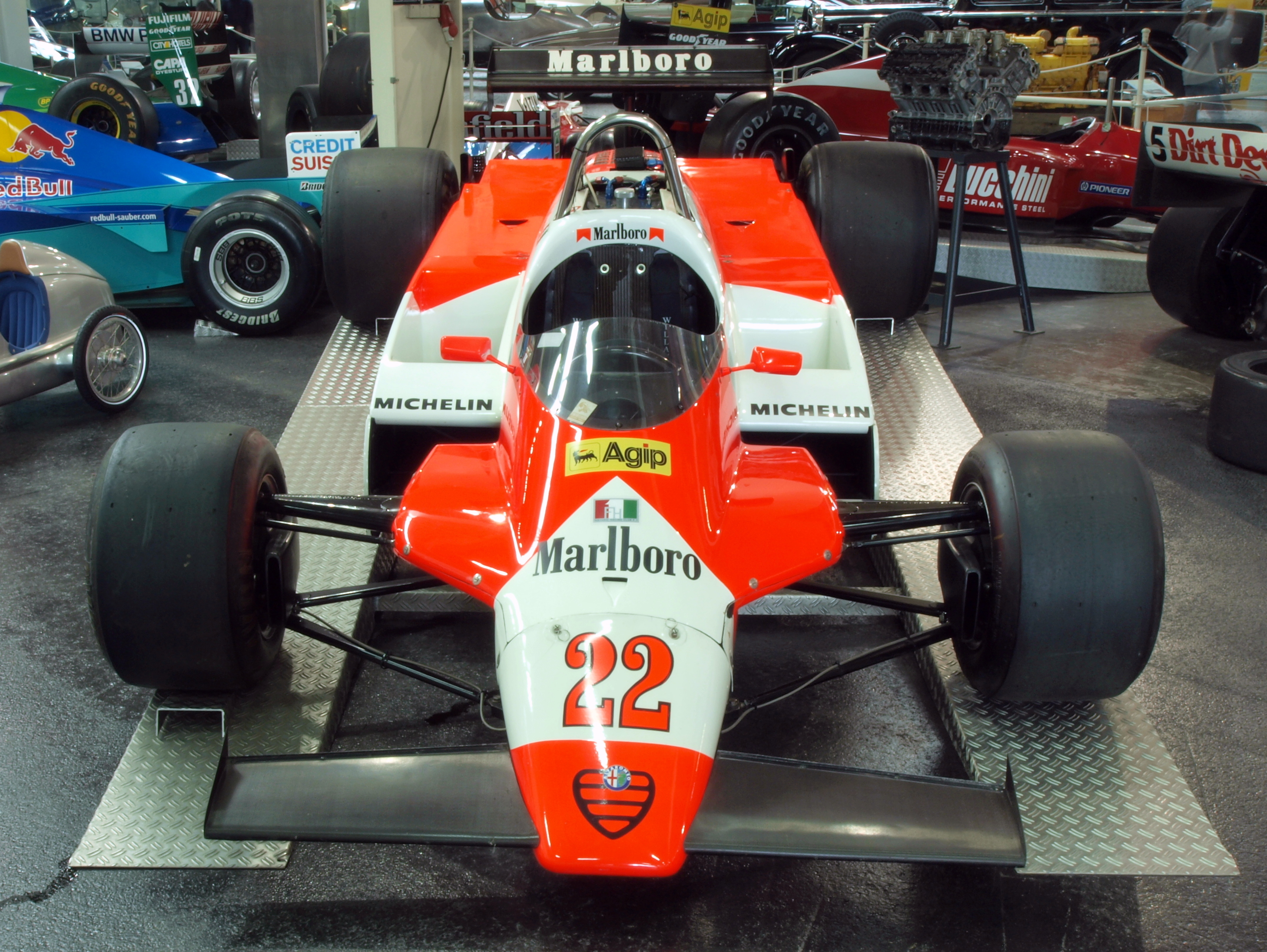
An Alfa Romeo 182B from 1982 with Marlboro livery.

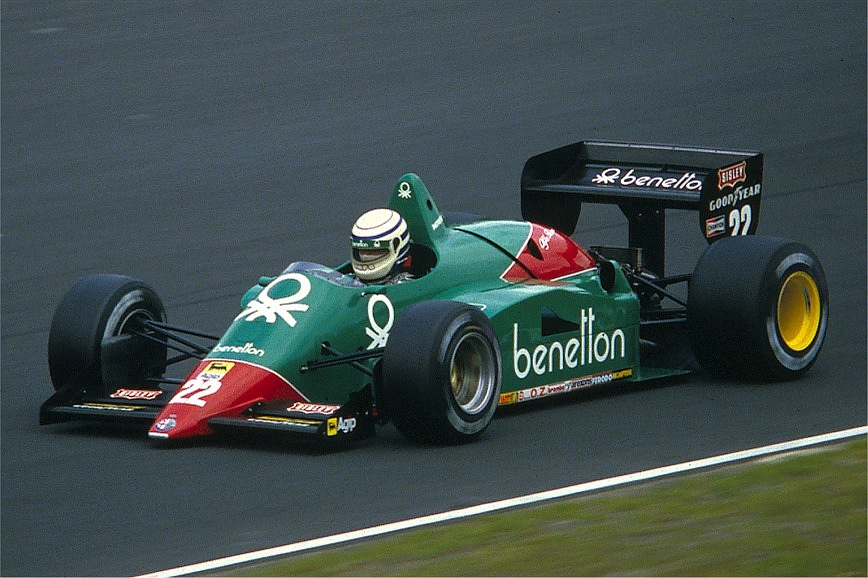
1985: an Alfa Romeo 184TB in Benetton livery.

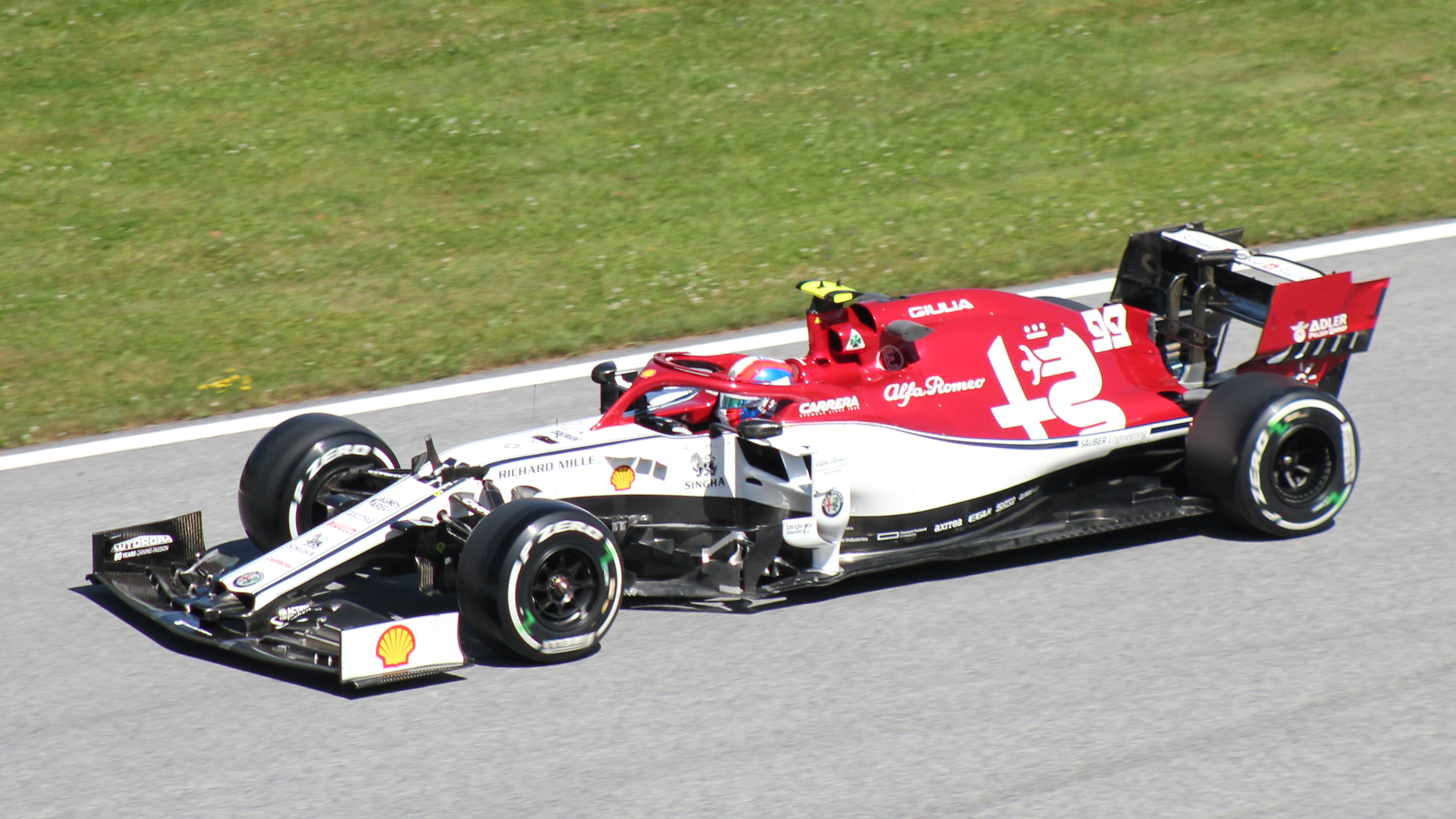
2019: Antonio Giovinazzi driving the Alfa Romeo C38 at the 2019 Austrian Grand Prix.

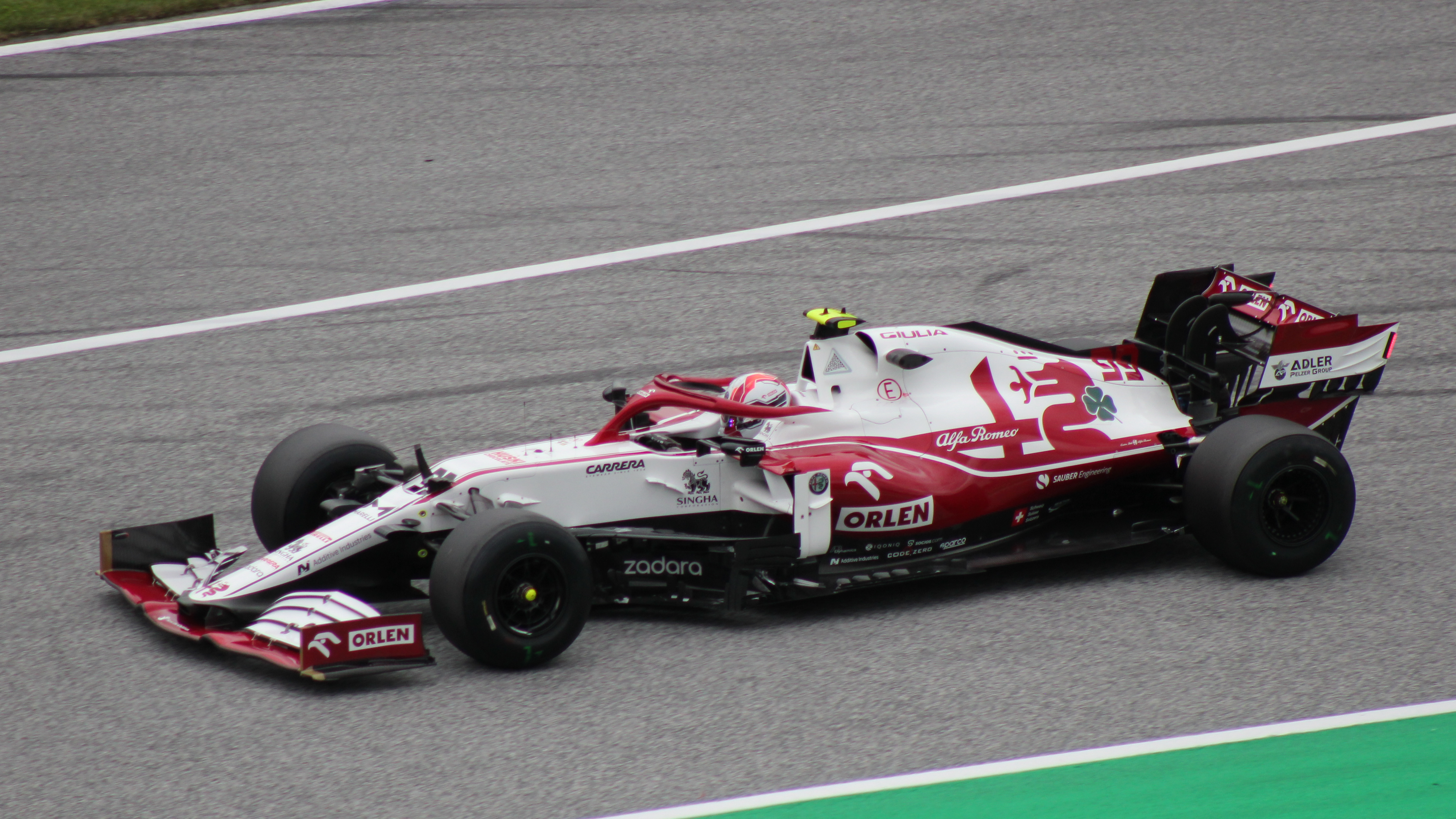
2021: Antonio Giovinazzi driving the Alfa Romeo C41 at the 2021 Austrian Grand Prix.

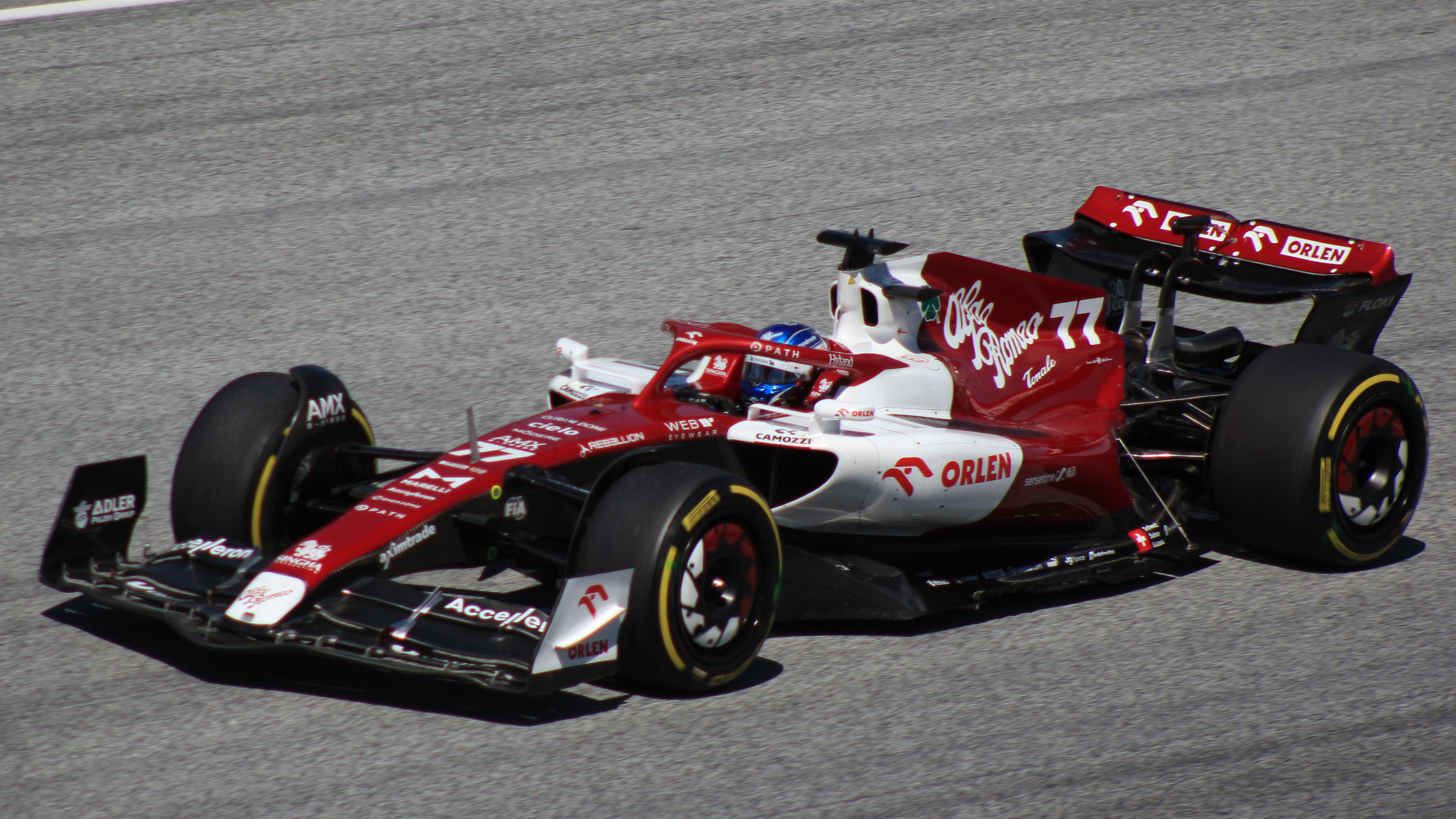
2022: Valtteri Bottas driving the Alfa Romeo C42 at the 2022 Austrian Grand Prix.

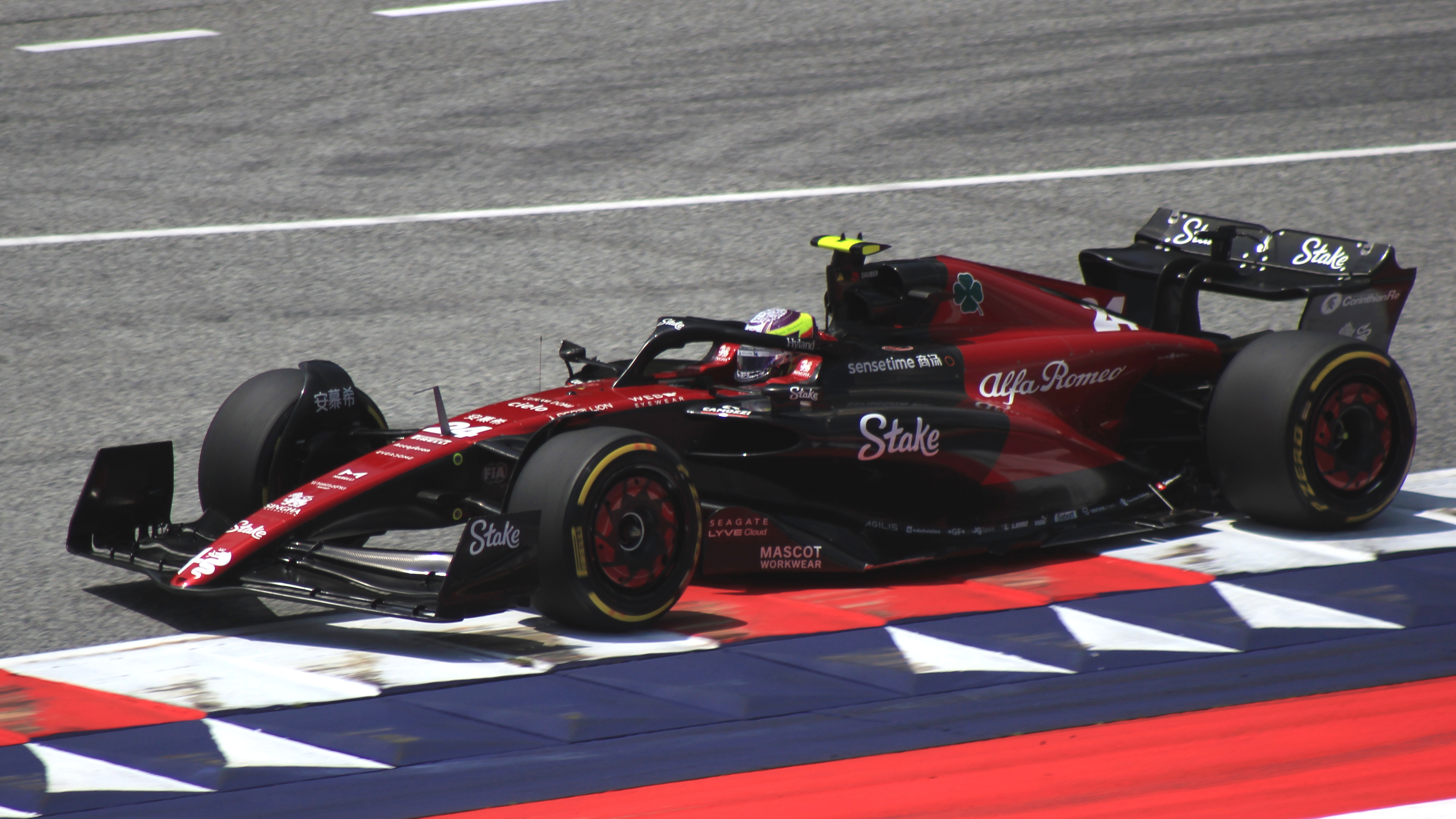
2023: Zhou Guanyu driving the Alfa Romeo C43 at the 2023 Austrian Grand Prix.

== AlphaTauri ==
Scuderia Toro Rosso was rebranded as Scuderia AlphaTauri in 2020 to promote Red Bull fashion brand AlphaTauri. Along with the rebrand, the team is no longer a junior team but a sister team to Red Bull Racing. The team was rebranded as RB in 2024.

Year	Main colour(s)	Additional colour(s)	Main sponsor(s)	Additional major sponsor(s)	Special liveries
2020	White, Navy Blue		AlphaTauri	Honda, Casio Edifice, Pirelli, RDS, My World, Moose, Randstad	
2021	Navy Blue	White	AlphaTauri	Honda, Casio Edifice, Pirelli, RDS, My World, Fantom, ICM	
2022	White, Navy Blue		AlphaTauri	Pirelli, Epicor, HRC/Honda, Fantom, ICM, Flex-Box, Ravenol, Ziba Foods, Buzz, RapidAPI, LIF3	
2023	Navy Blue, White	Red	AlphaTauri, PKN Orlen	Pirelli, Epicor, HRC/Honda, Flex-Box, Ravenol, RapidAPI, XMTrading, NEFT Vodka, Gundam	AlphaTauri raced a special livery inspired by the AlphaTauri x Brendan Monroe Las Vegas Capsule Collection for the final two races of the season.

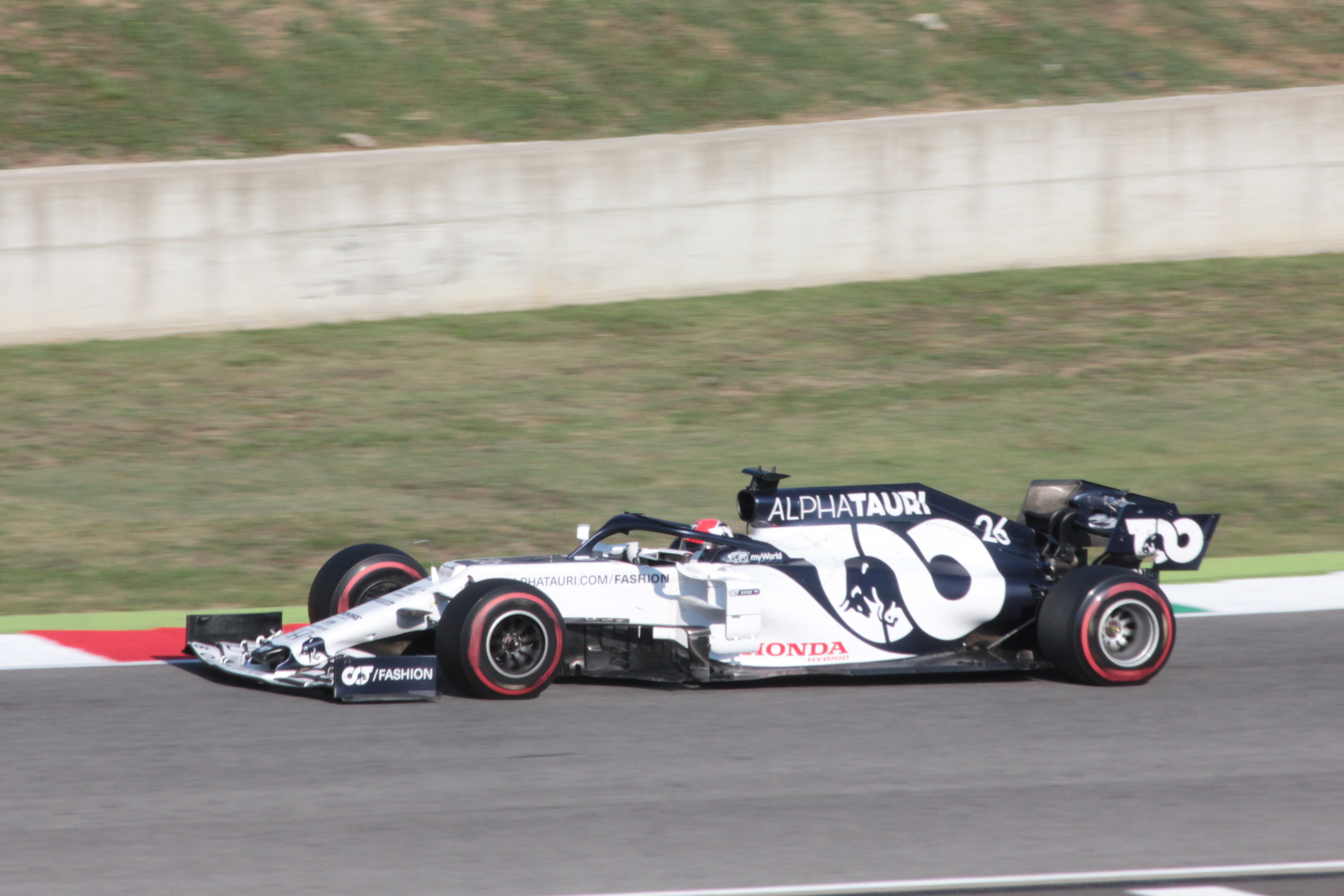
Daniil Kvyat driving the AlphaTauri AT01 at the 2020 Tuscan Grand Prix

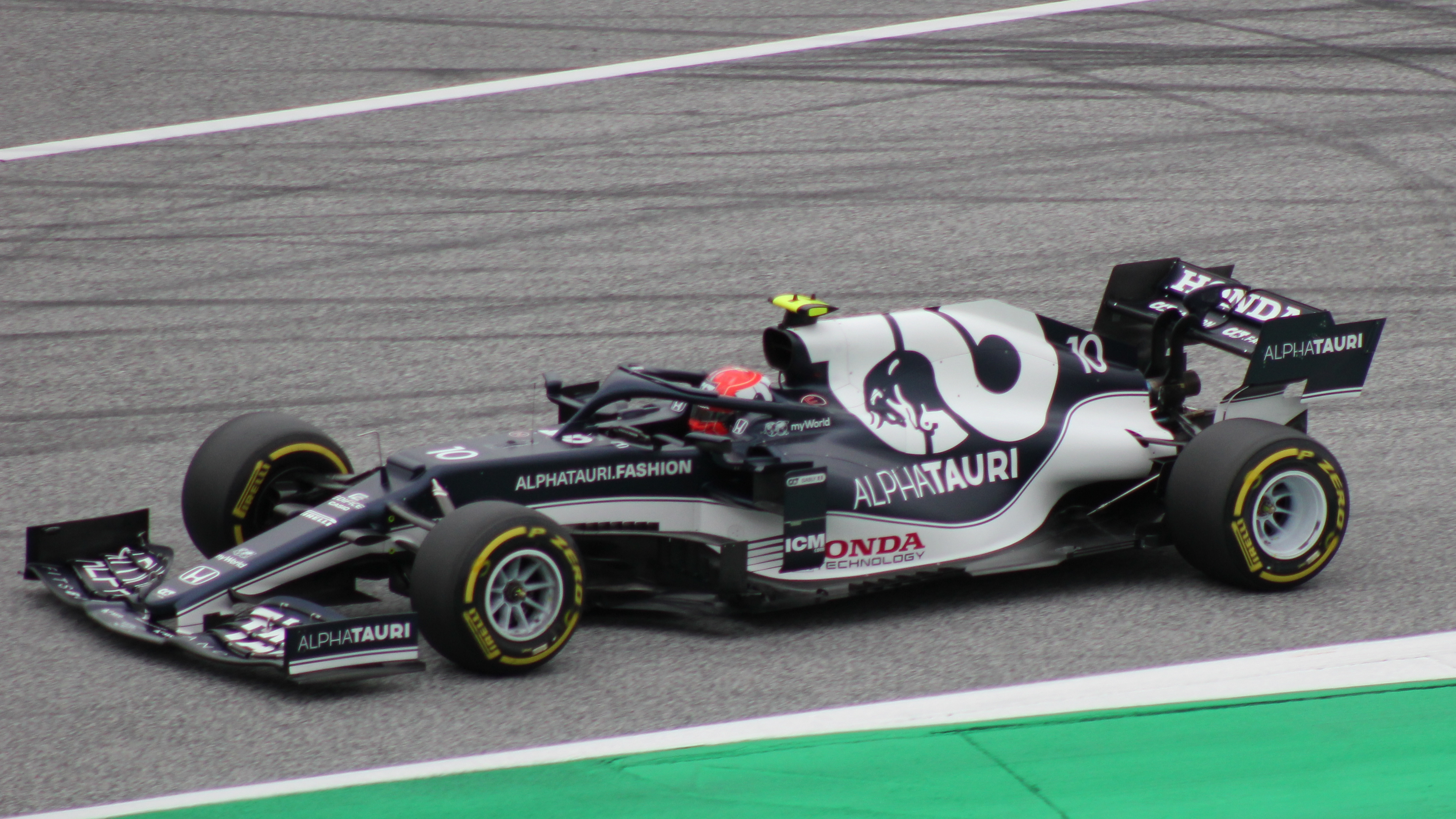
Pierre Gasly driving the AlphaTauri AT02 at the 2021 Austrian Grand Prix

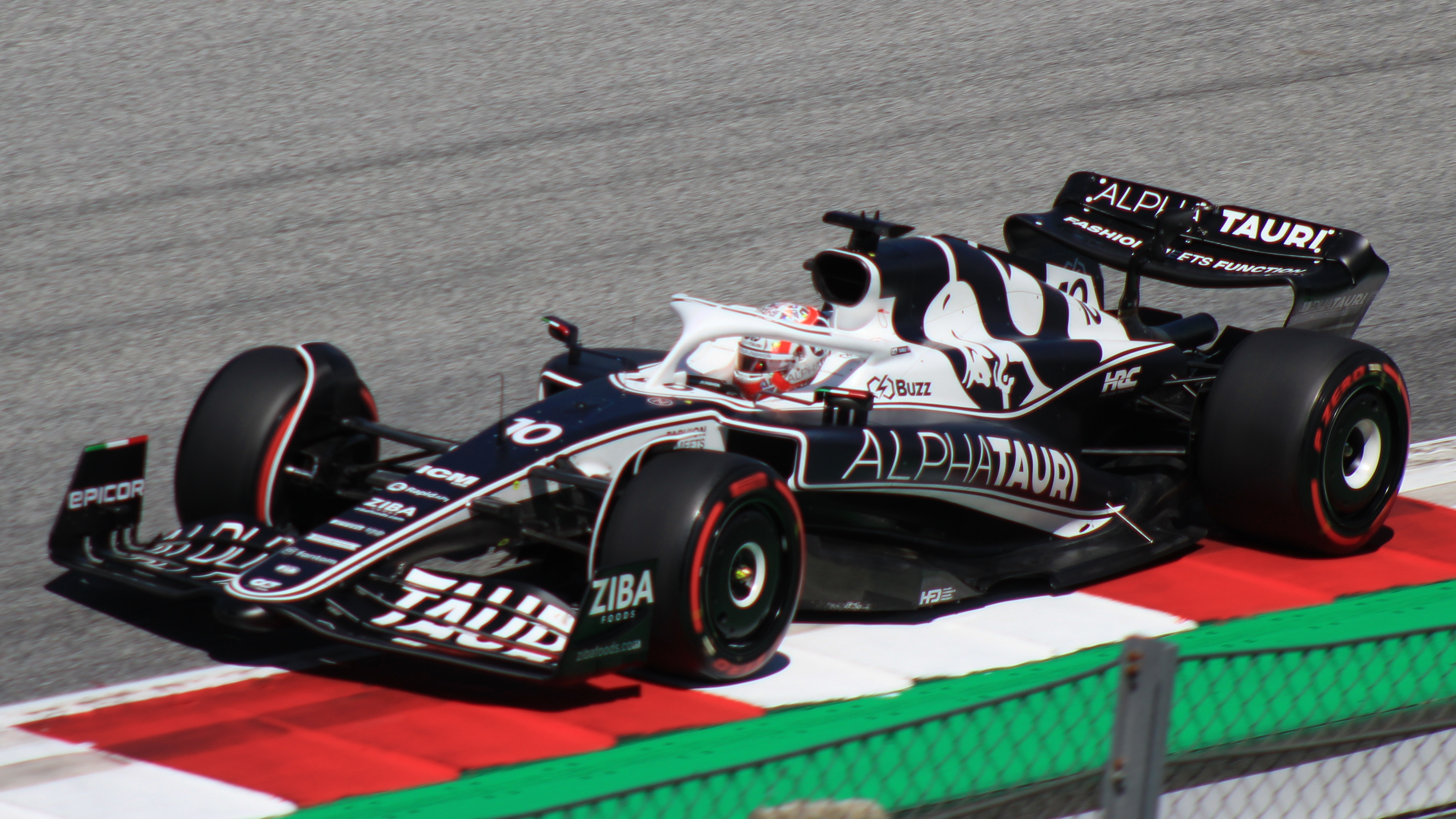
Pierre Gasly driving the AlphaTauri AT03 at the 2022 Austrian Grand Prix

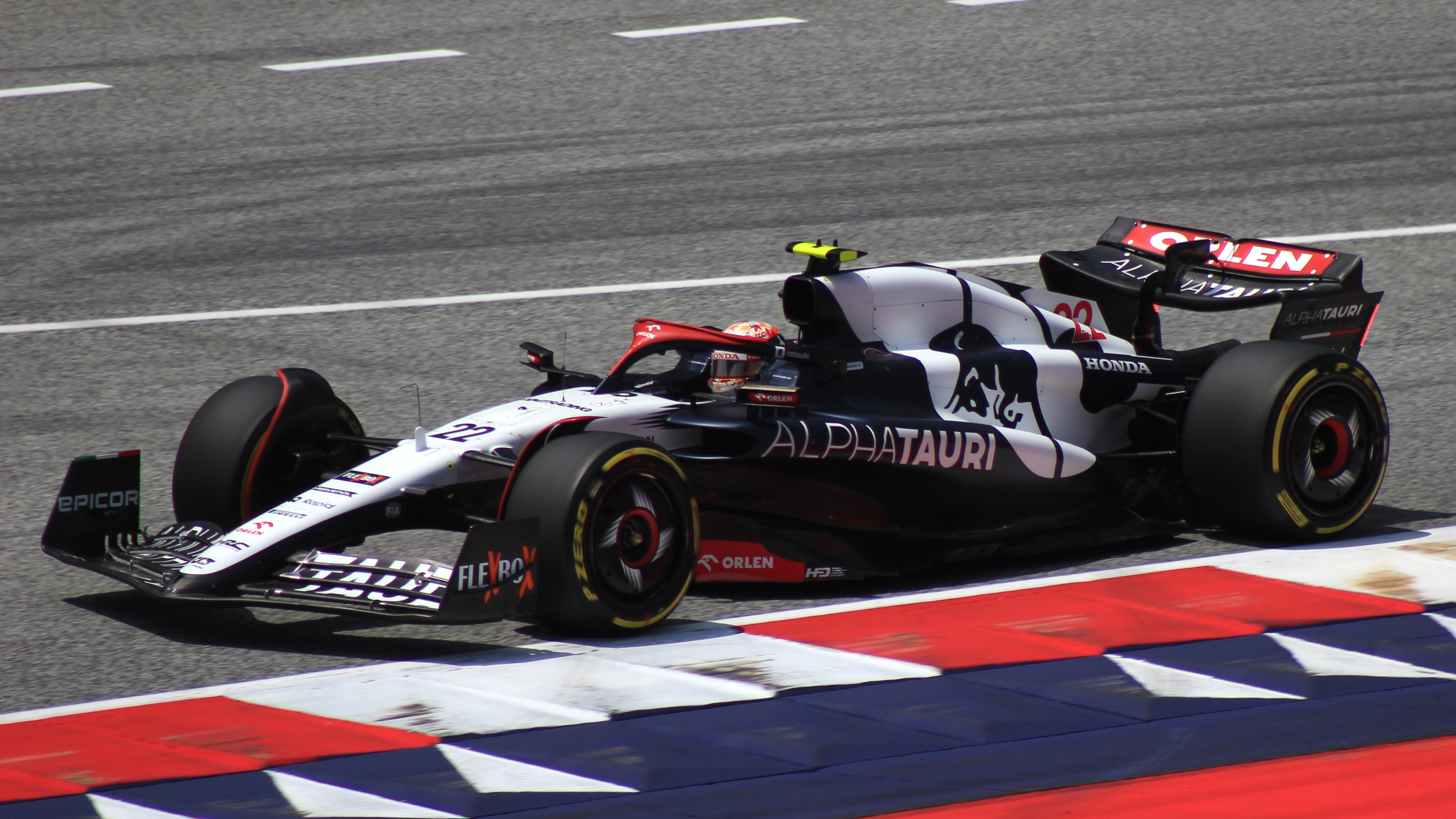
Yuki Tsunoda driving the AlphaTauri AT04 at the 2023 Austrian Grand Prix

== Alpine ==
Renault was rebranded as Alpine in 2021 to promote Groupe Renault brand Automobiles Alpine.

Year	Main colour(s)	Additional colour(s)	Main sponsor(s)	Additional major sponsor(s)	Special liveries
2021	Blue	Red, White	Alpine	Renault, MAPFRE, Castrol, BP, RCI Banque, GENII, Bell & Ross, Pirelli, Microsoft, DuPont, Hewlett-Packard, +GF+, EURODATACAR, Yahoo!, Le Coq Sportif, Plug Power	During the 2021 Saudi Arabian Grand Prix, Alpine ran a special livery to commemorate their 100th race with sponsor Castrol.
2022–2023	Blue	Pink, Black	Alpine, BWT	Renault, MAPFRE (2022), Castrol, BP, RCI Banque (2022), GENII (2022), Bell & Ross (2022), Pirelli, Microsoft, DuPont (2022), EURODATACAR, Mandiant (2022), Binance, Yahoo!, data.ai (2022), ADA Cosmetics, Sprinklr, Plug Power, Kappa, Mobilize, Ecowatt (2023)	Since the beginning of their partnership with BWT, pink-accented liveries have been used by Alpine in certain rounds of the season. Initially, they were used for the opening rounds of the 2022 and 2023 seasons, while the livery was used in the final three races of 2024 and at the 2025 Las Vegas Grand Prix. Following its partnership with Mercado Libre in 2025-2026, Alpine has run special liveries in the United States, Mexico, São Paulo, and Miami Grands Prix. Alpine also runs special liveries to commemorate sponsors such as Xbox and Ryan Reynolds. Alpine runs rainbow flags on the car for races taking place on Pride Month. Alpine raced with black nose cones at the 2022 Italian Grand Prix to mourn the death of Elizabeth II. Alpine's final race with Renault engines, the 2025 Abu Dhabi Grand Prix, features a "Merci Viry" decal on the tub.
2024	Black	Blue, Pink	Alpine, BWT	Renault, Castrol, BP, Pirelli, Microsoft, Binance, Yahoo!, ADA Cosmetics, Sprinklr, Kappa, Mobilize, H. Moser & Cie, Business Solver, MNTN, INFINOX, Banco BRB, ApeCoin, JAAQ	
2025–2026	Blue	Pink, Black	Alpine, BWT	Pirelli, Microsoft (2025), Binance (2025), Sprinklr (2025), Castore, Mobilize, MNTN (2025), INFINOX (2025), ApeCoin (2025), JAAQ, Mercado Libre (2025–2026), EURODATACAR, Eni, ADA Cosmetics, MSC Cruises, Moser Watch, Business Solver, Modo Casino, Delphi Technologies, Banco BRB (2025), Trak Racer, Arctic Wolf Networks, eToro (2026), Avature (2026), Windhager (2026), Indramind (2026), Oakberry, Renault 5 Turbo 3E, Cato Networks (2026), Mission, Seal SQ (2026), Adobe (2026)	

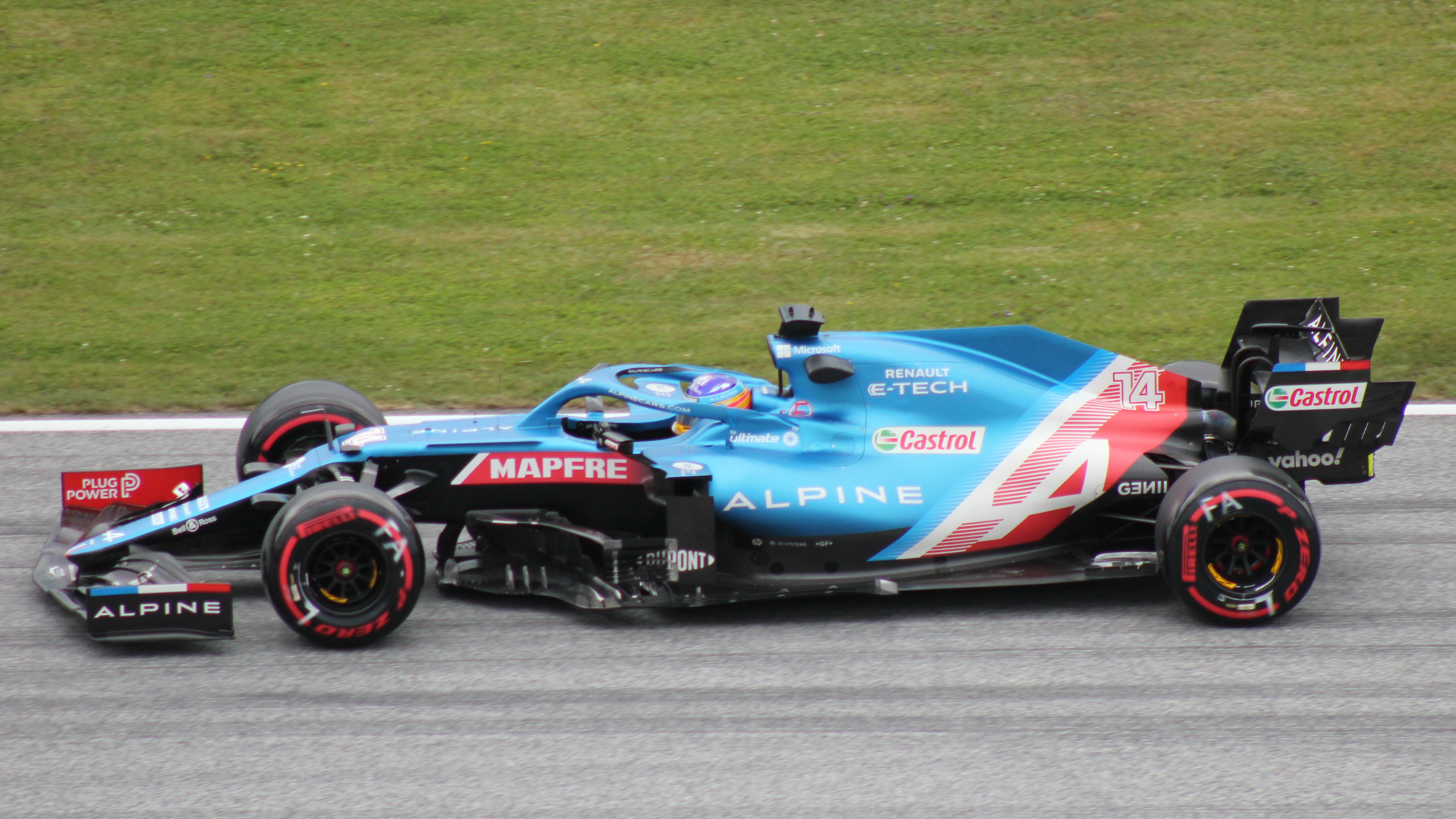
2021: Fernando Alonso driving the Alpine A521 at the 2021 Austrian Grand Prix

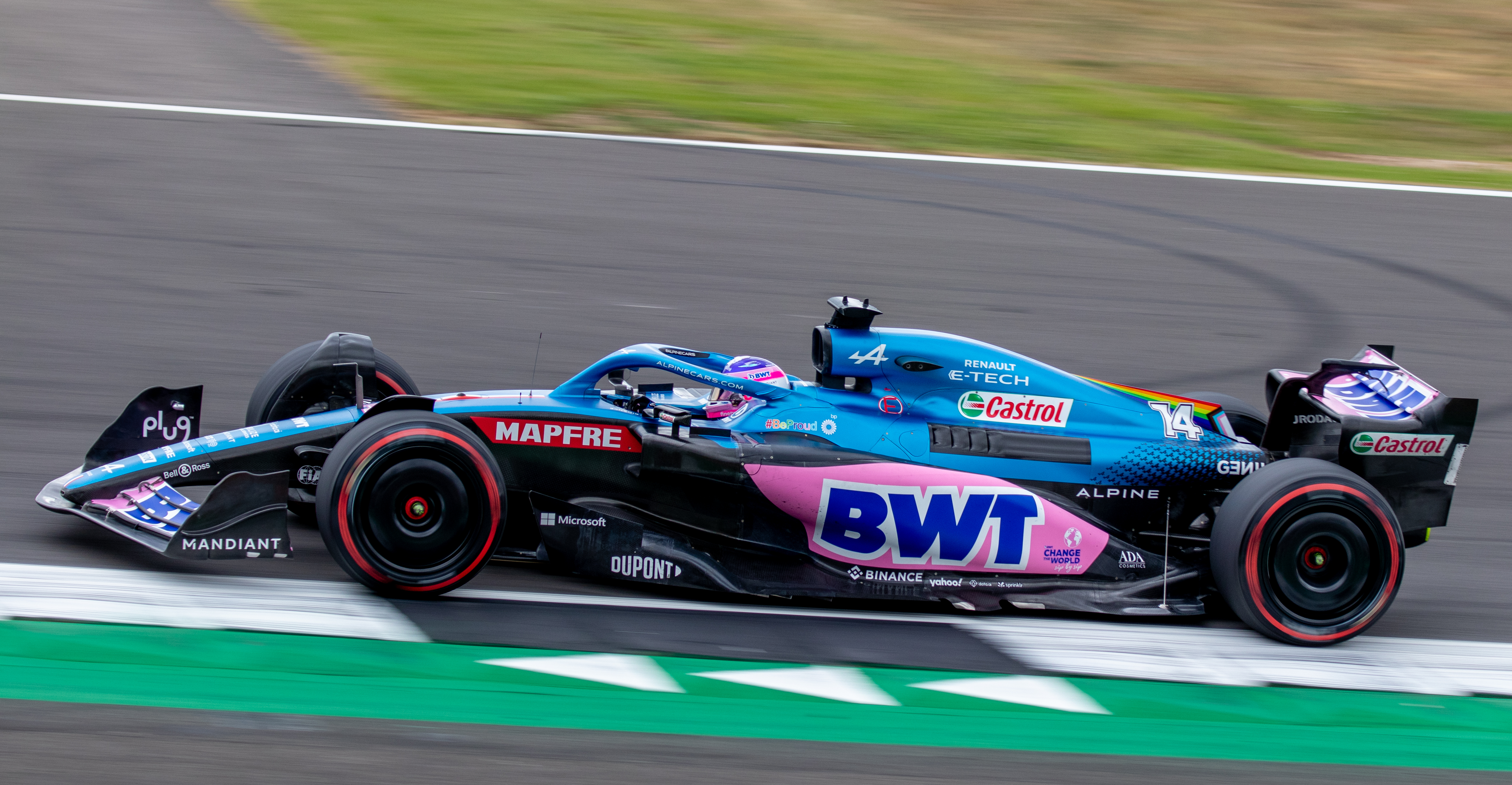
2022: Fernando Alonso driving the Alpine A522 at the 2022 British Grand Prix

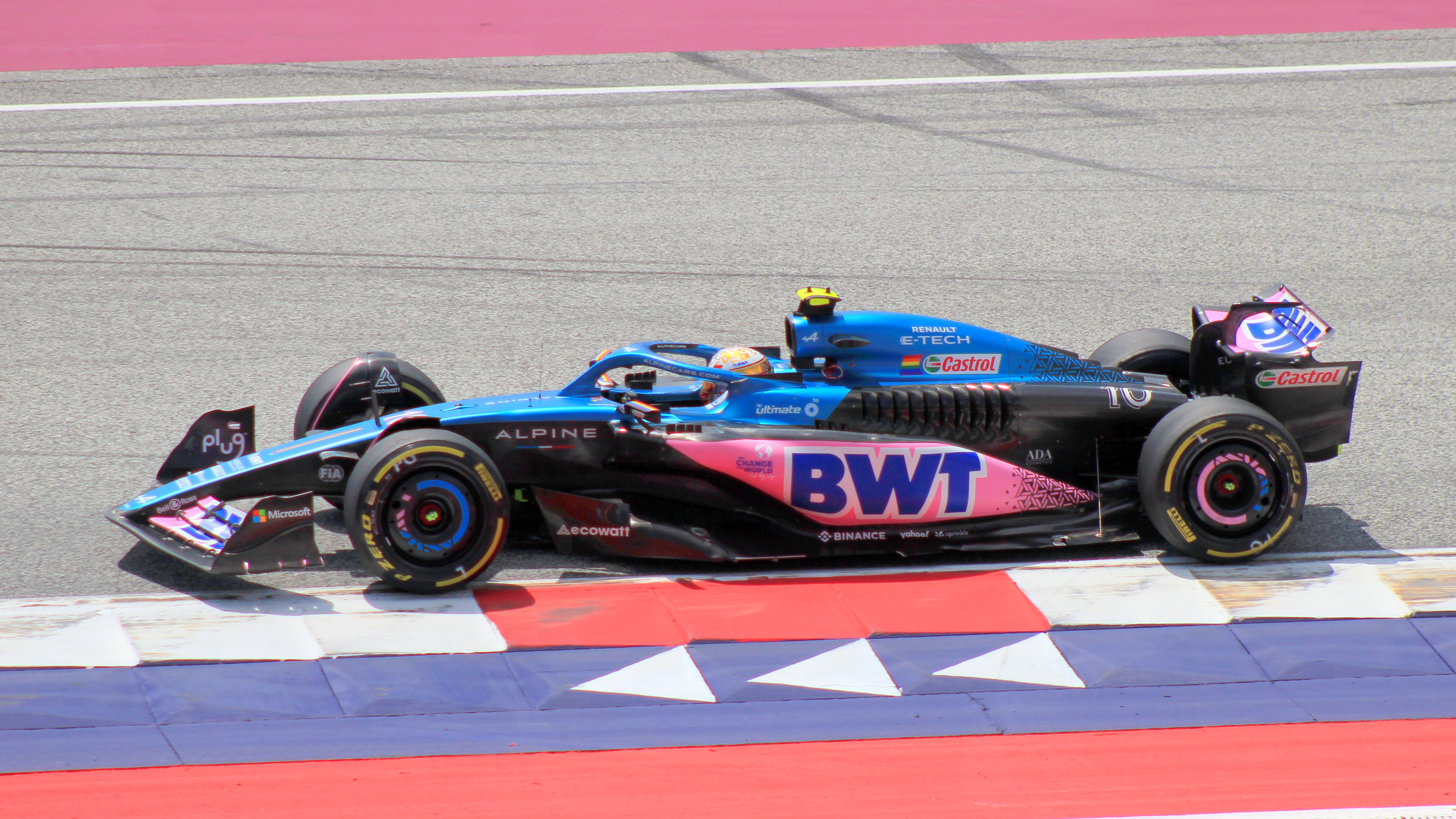
2023: Pierre Gasly driving the Alpine A523 at the 2023 Austrian Grand Prix

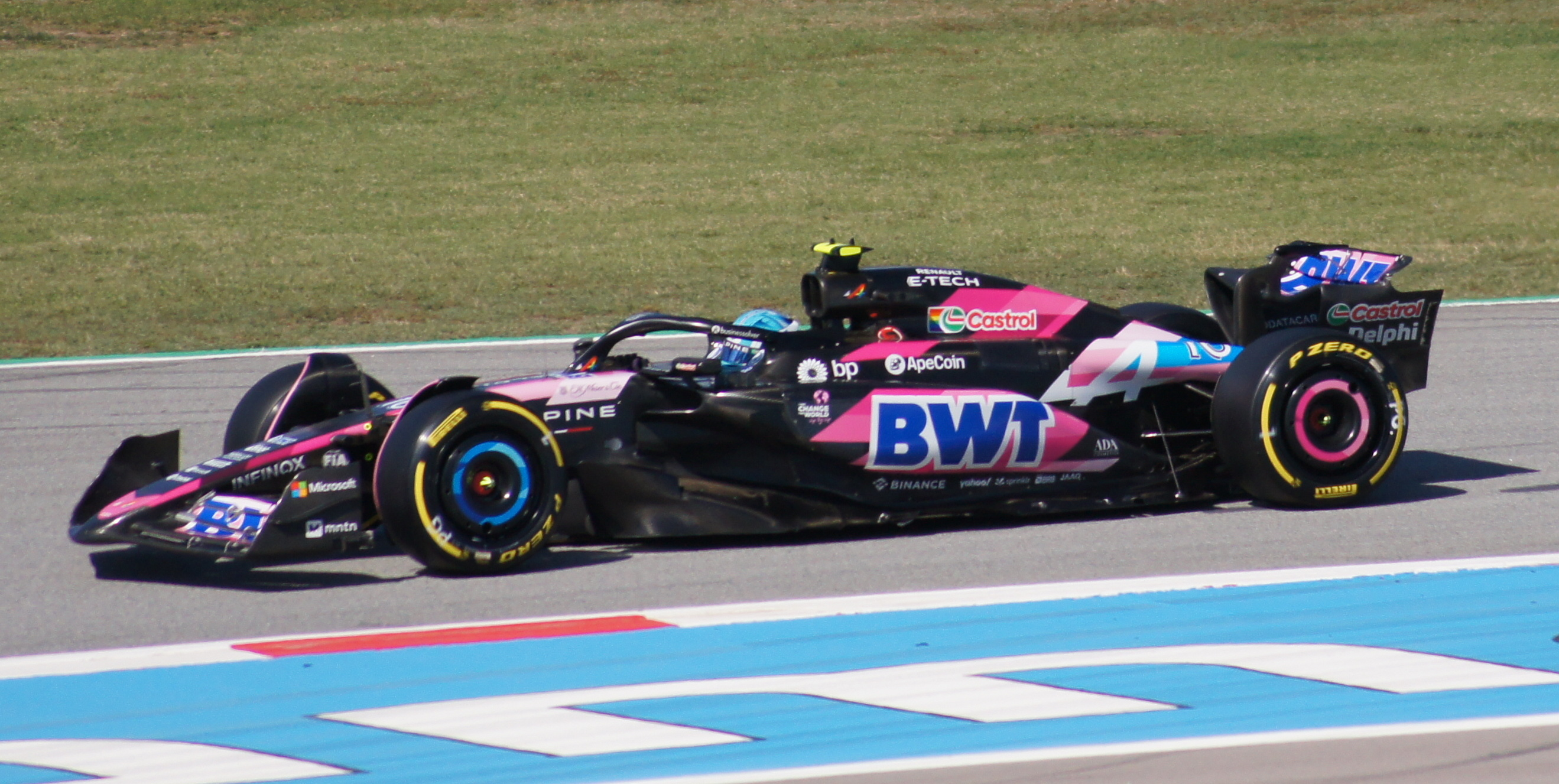
2024: Pierre Gasly driving the Alpine A524 at the 2024 Spanish Grand Prix

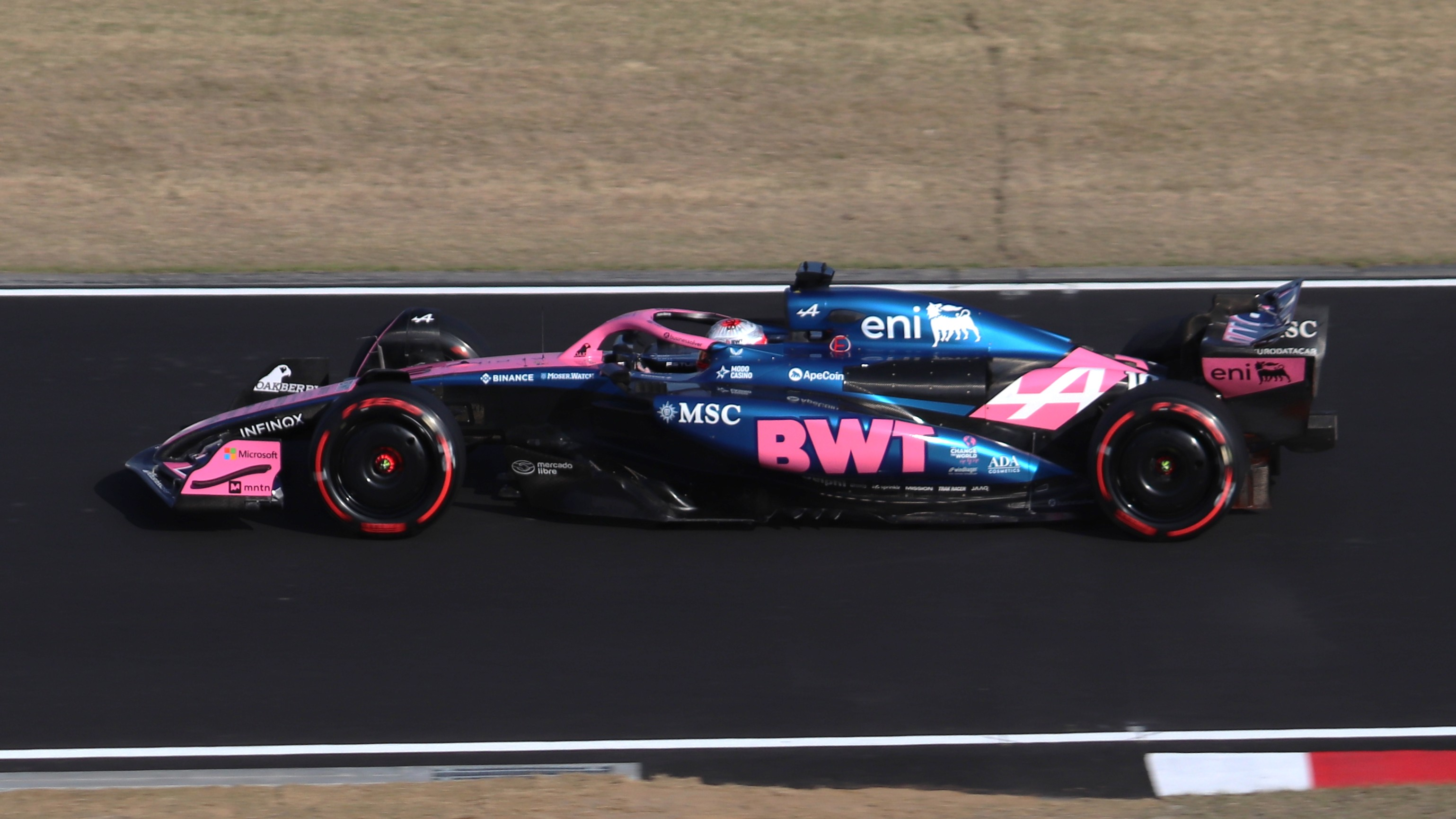
2025: Pierre Gasly driving the Alpine A525 at the 2025 Japanese Grand Prix

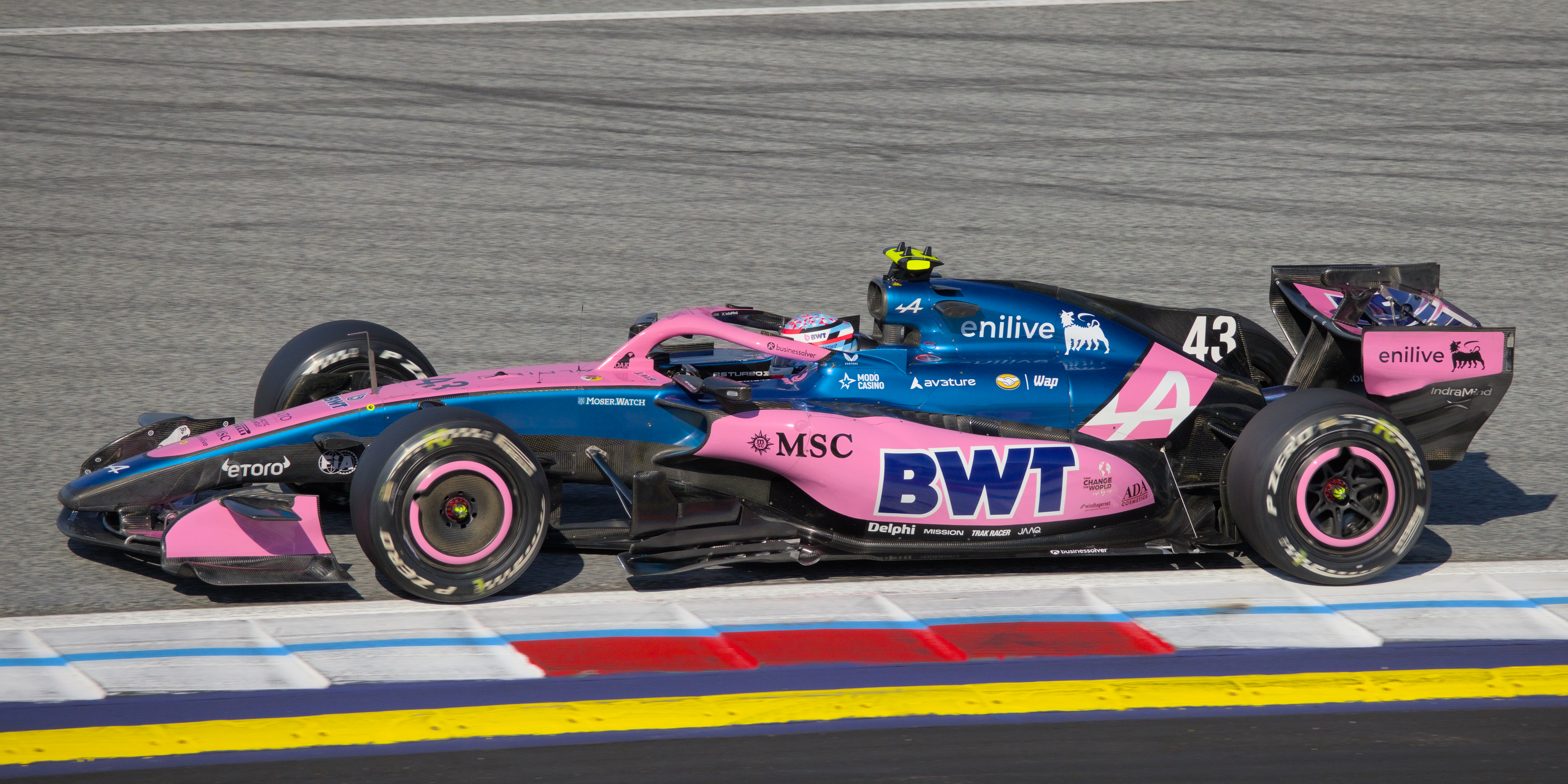
2026: Franco Colapinto driving the Alpine A526 at the 2026 Austrian Grand Prix

== Andrea Moda ==
Year	Main colour(s)	Additional colour(s)	Main sponsor(s)	Additional major sponsor(s)
1992	Black	Yellow	Andrea Moda, iGuzzini, Ellesse	Industrie Regione Marche, teuco, Annabella, Urbis, Mase, Blue Box, Agip

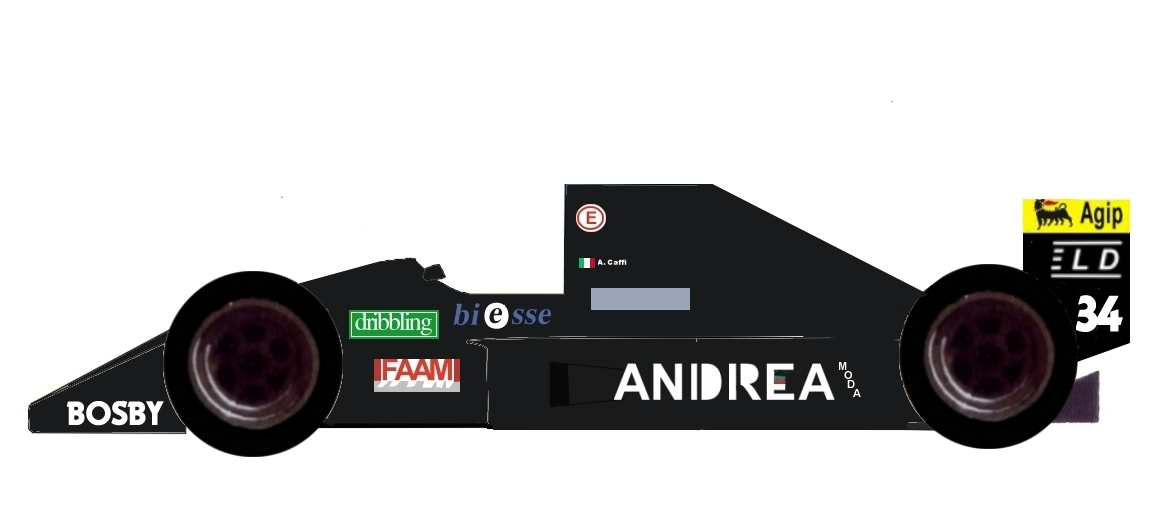
The Andrea Moda C4B with the livery used in 1992 South African Grand Prix

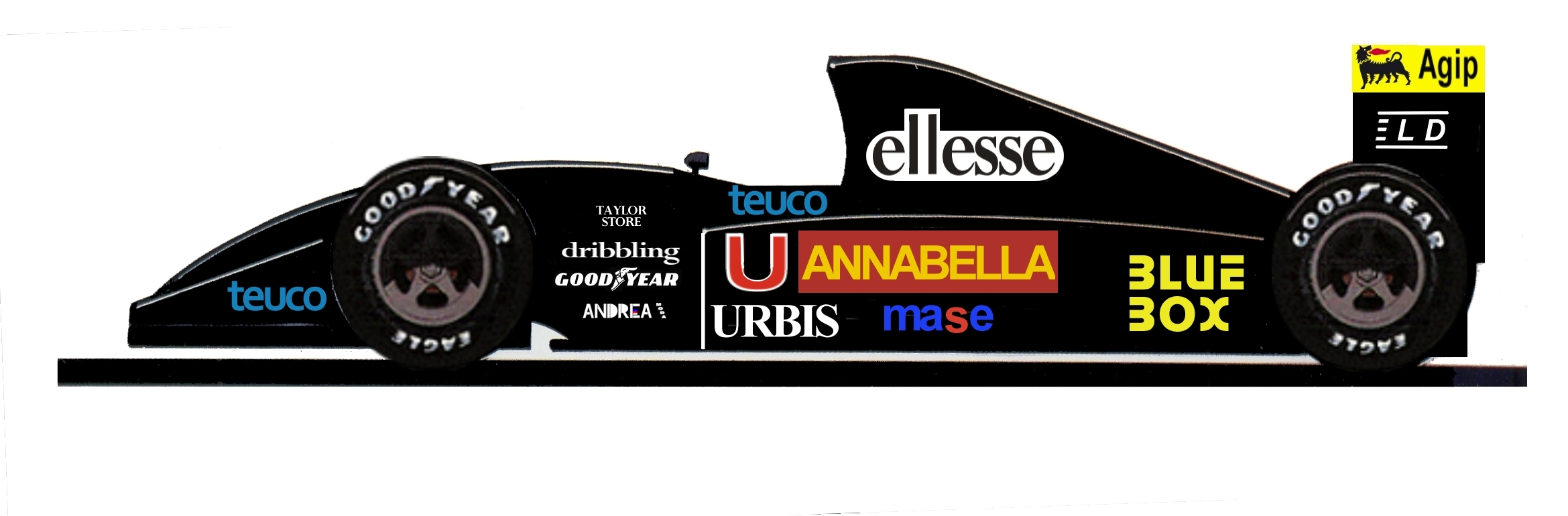
The Andrea Moda S921 with the livery used in 1992 Monaco Grand Prix

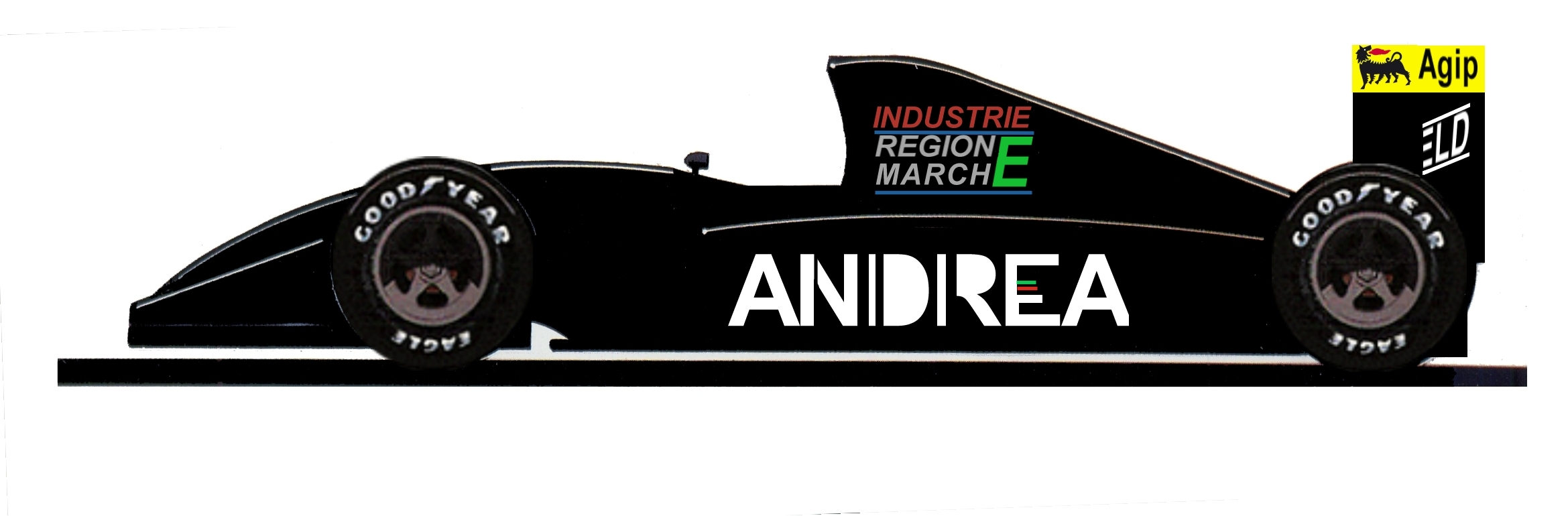
The Andrea Moda S921 with the livery used in 1992 Hungarian Grand Prix

== Arrows ==
Starting in the 1970s and going for decades until ending in mid-2002, Arrows, that was known as Footwork for a few years in the 1990s, had distinctive liveries, like the unusual Ruffles sponsorship in Footwork, an all-black car in the 1998 season, and an orange car in its final years.

Year	Main colour(s)	Additional colour(s)	Main sponsor(s)	Additional major sponsor(s)
1978	White		Varig (Brazilian Grand Prix only)	
1978	Gold		Warsteiner (South African Grand Prix onwards)	FINA, Heuer, Scicon Micro Systems ARCO Graphite (Long Beach Grand Prix only)
1979	Gold	Black	Warsteiner	Scicon Micro Systems
1980	Gold	Black	Warsteiner	Valvoline; Penthouse (Canadian Grand Prix and United States Grand Prix only); Rizla+. (Canadian Grand Prix and United States Grand Prix only)
1981	Orange	White	Ceramiche Ragno, Beta Utensili	Valvoline, Glasurit Car Paint; Penthouse (Canadian Grand Prix and United States Grand Prix only)
1982	Orange	White	Ceramiche Ragno	Autosonik, Elf, Glasurit Car Paint, Nordica; Penthouse (Brazilian Grand Prix, Long Beach Grand Prix and Detroit Grand Prix only)
1983	Various		Valvoline (Long Beach Grand Prix and Dutch Grand Prix only); Bembom Bros. OK Corral (French Grand Prix only); Marilena (San Marino Grand Prix only); Barclay (Monaco Grand Prix, Belgian Grand Prix, Detroit Grand Prix and Austrian Grand Prix only); Pepsi Déca (Canadian Grand Prix only); Grand Prix International (British Grand Prix only); Leonardo Lederbekleidung (German Grand Prix only); Golia (Italian Grand Prix only); MacConnal-Mason Gallery Fine Paintings (European Grand Prix and South African Grand Prix only)	Allwave Hi-Fi, Copy Braun, Dimensione Uomo, Glasurit Car Paint, Le Vif, Louis De Poortere Carpets, Megatron, Provigo, Rizla+., SNIA, Valvoline
1984	Gold	Blue, Red	Barclay, Nordica	BMW M Power, Glasurit Car Paint, Louis De Poortere Carpets, SNIA, Valvoline
1985	Gold	Blue	Barclay, De'Longhi	BMW M Power, Camozzi, Castrol, Glasurit Car Paint, GSI, Millfix, USF&G Financial Services
1986	Gold	Red	Barclay, USF&G Financial Services	BMW M Power, Budget Rent a Car, Camozzi, Glasurit Car Paint
1987	White	Dark Red, Blue	USF&G Financial Services	Bosch, Camozzi, Glasurit Car Paint, Garrett Turbo, Kepner Tregoe, Megatron, Trussardi, Wintershall
1988	White	Dark Red, Blue	USF&G Financial Services	3M, Beta Utensili, Bosch, Camozzi, Garrett Turbo, Glasurit Car Paint, Kepner Tregoe, Megatron, Wintershall
1989	White	Dark Red, Blue	USF&G Asset Management	AXE, Camozzi, Concret Leasing GmbH, Ford, Glasurit Car Paint, Identicar, Kepner Tregoe, Maxon Mobile Radio, Mobil1, Raychem
1990	White	Red	Footwork, USF&G Asset Management	Ansys, Camozzi, Elf, Gearbox Sports, Glasurit Car Paint
1991	White	Red	Footwork	Blaupunkt, Bosch, Camozzi, OZ Wheels, Shell
1992	White	Red	Footwork	Adidas, BP, Hamacher, Midori Elec., OZ Wheels, Toshiba
1993	White	Red	Footwork	Adidas, BP, Dynabook, Glasurit Car Paint, Midori Elec., OZ Wheels, Toshiba
1994	White	Blue, Red, Green		Alibert, Bauer, Byte, Caberg, Cellular One, Elf, Fox Petroli, Gamma Due Ceramica Design, Ford, Glasurit Car Paint, Lee Cooper, Mandarina Duck, Marlboro, Matix Design, Old Spice, OTC Computer, Piolanti & Figli, ProCom, Robopac, Ruffles, SAG '80, Super C, Suzuki, Ville-Marie
1995	White	Blue, Red	Unimat Life Corporation	Alopex, El Charro, Flexform Divani, Gamma Due Ceramica Design, Glasurit Car Paint, Hype, Lati, Matrix Design, Personal, Ricardo, Sally, Sasol, Sergio Tacchini, Star TV, Suzuki, T&J Vestor, TecnoFerrari, Ville-Maerie
1996	White	Blue, Red	Philips Car Systems, Power Horse	Bauducco, BellSouth, Brother, CarIn Navigation System, Castrol, Cricket & Co, Enkei, Glasurit Car Paint, Hewlett-Packard, Hype, Lectra Systems, Lycra, Pace Airlines, Pack Plast, Parmalat, Quest International, Ricardo, Sally, Sergio Tacchini, TopWare, Tom Walkinshaw Racing, Track & Field
1996	Red	Blue, White	Philips Car Systems, Power Horse	Bauducco, BellSouth, Brother, CarIn Navigation System, Castrol, Cricket & Co, Enkei, Glasurit Car Paint, Hewlett-Packard, Hype, Lectra Systems, Lycra, Pace Airlines, Pack Plast, Parmalat, Quest International, Ricardo, Sally, Sergio Tacchini, TopWare, Tom Walkinshaw Racing, Track & Field
1997	White	Blue	Danka, Parmalat, Zepter	Bogner, Brastemp, Eagle Star Insurance, Ferretti Group, Glasurit Car Paint, Kibon, Power Horse, Quest International, Remus Performance Sport Exhausts, Yamaha
1998	Black	None	Danka, Power Horse, TWR, Zepter	Parmalat, Brastemp, Ixion, Eagle Star, DiverseyLever, Purina, Elf
1999	Black	Red, White, Orange	Repsol	T-Minus, PIAA Corporation, Zepter, Morgan Grenfell, Power Horse, Catia Solutions, F1 Racing, Ixion, Glasurit Car Paint, Champion
2000–2002	Orange	Black	Orange	Red Bull, Chello, Lost Boys, Repsol YPF (2000), Eurobet (2000), Cartoon Network (2000), Catia Solutions, Paul Costelloe (2001), Magneti Marelli (2000), European Aviation (2000)

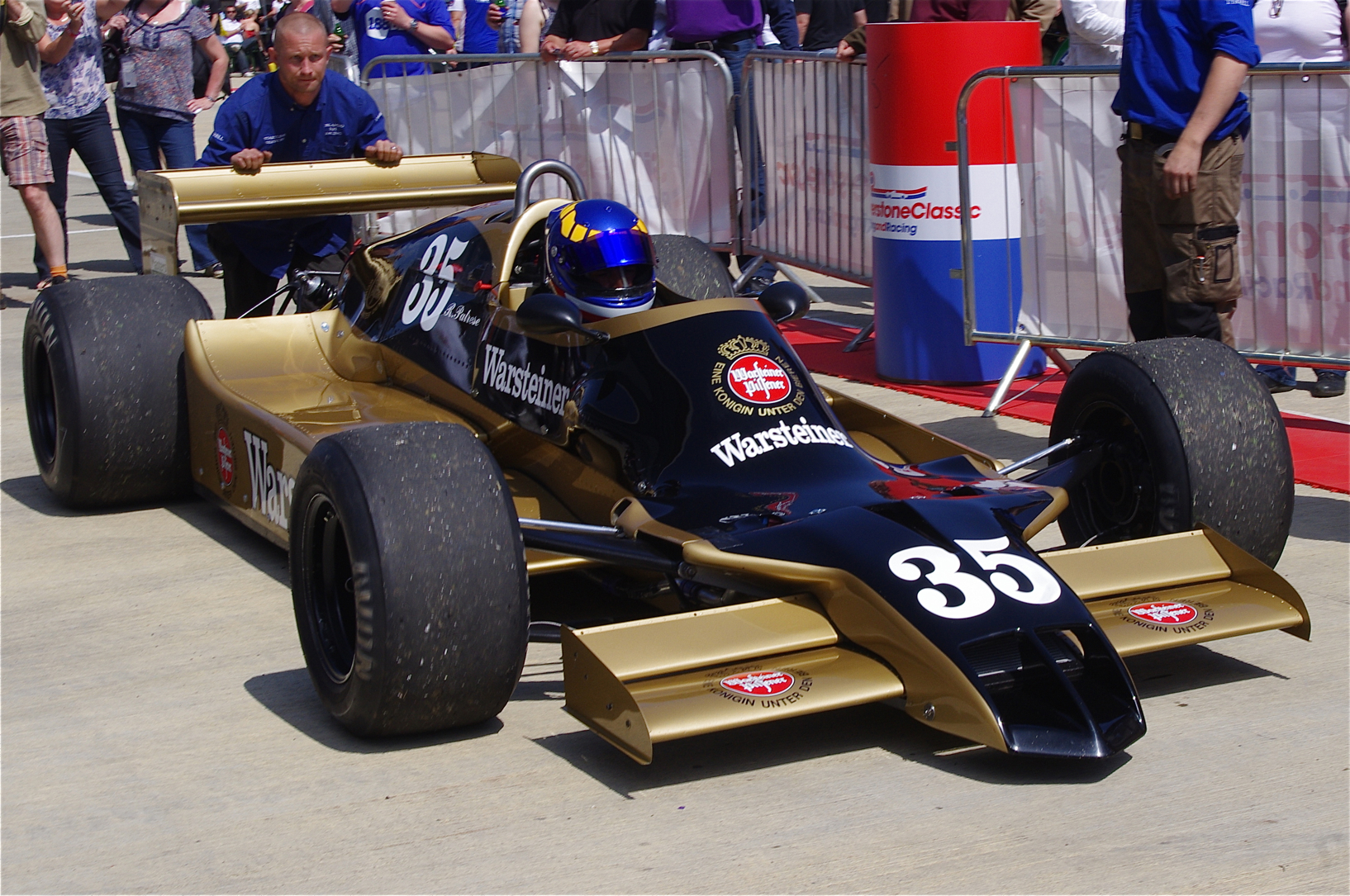
An Arrows A1 from 1978 at Silverstone Classic 2012

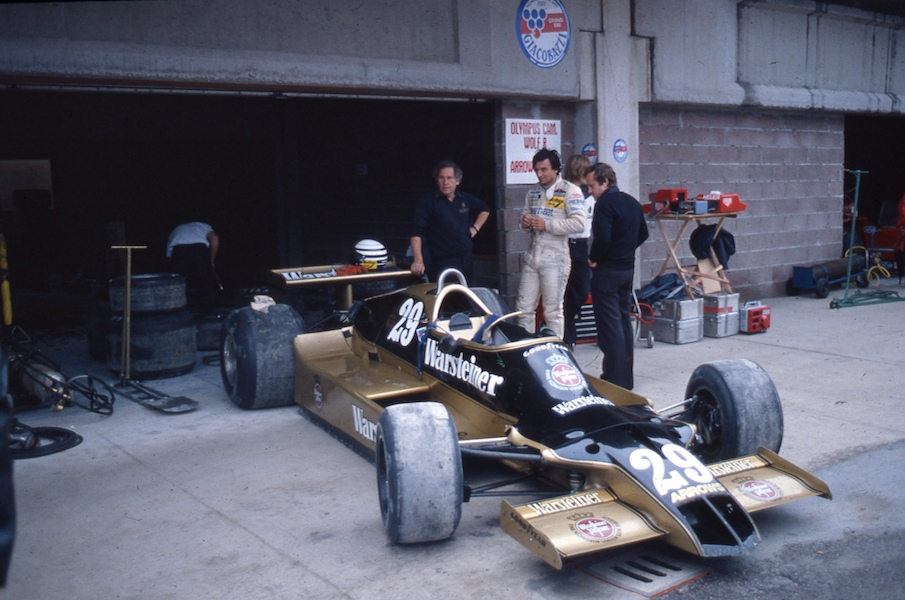
Riccardo Patrese with his A1B in 1979.

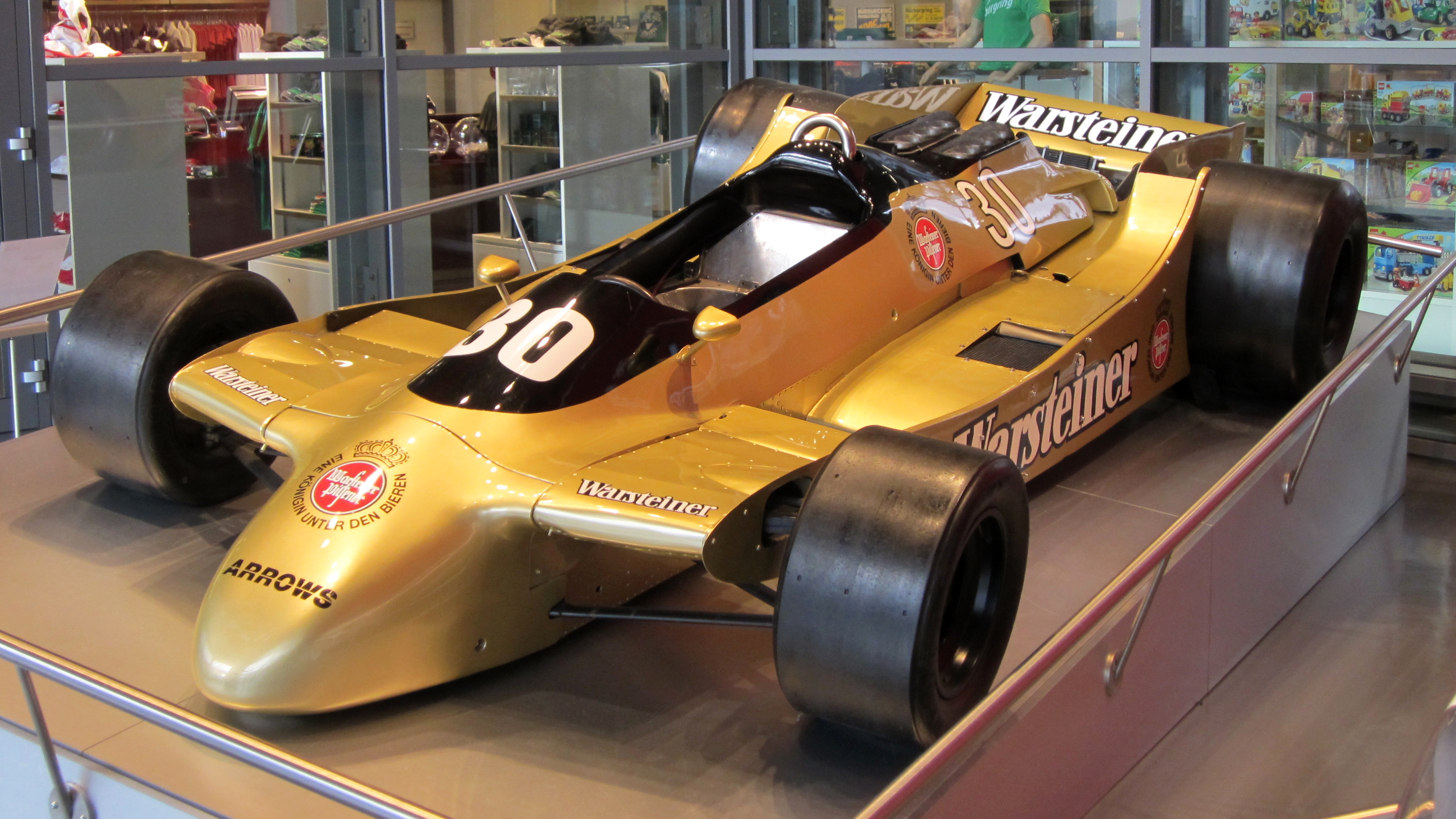
An Arrows A2 from 1979 in its Warsteiner livery in display

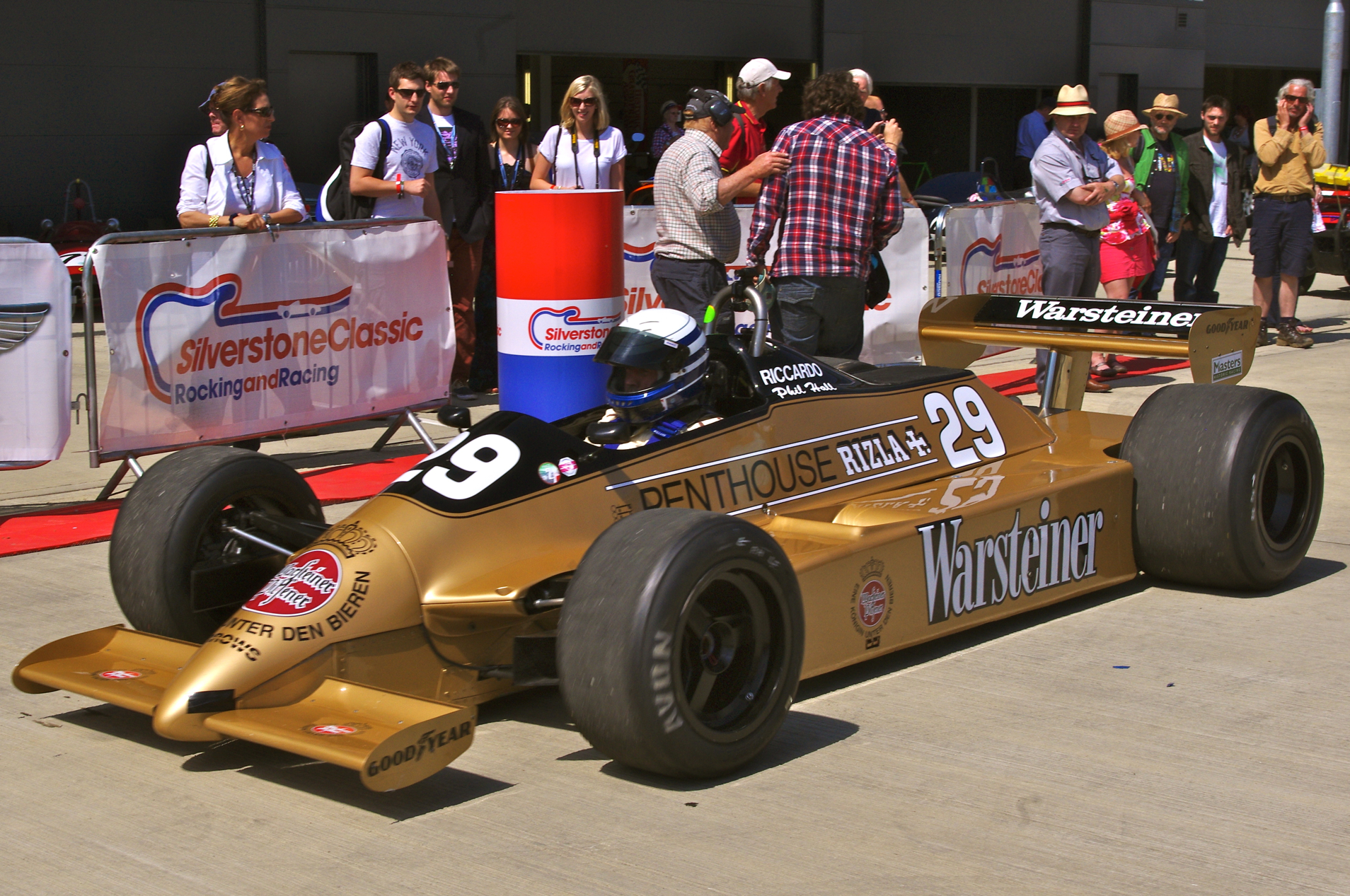
Riccardo Patrese's Arrows A3 being tested at Silverstone Classic

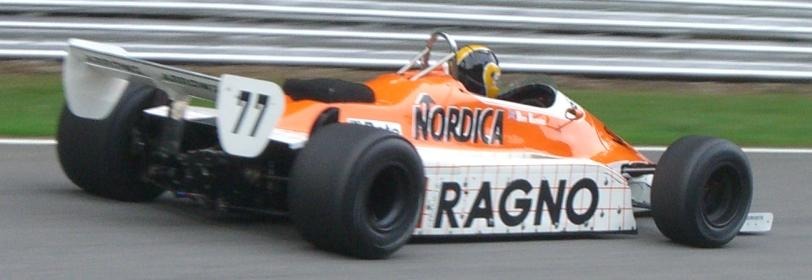
In 1982, Arrows raced with an orange livery. This is an Arrows A4 being tested in 2005.

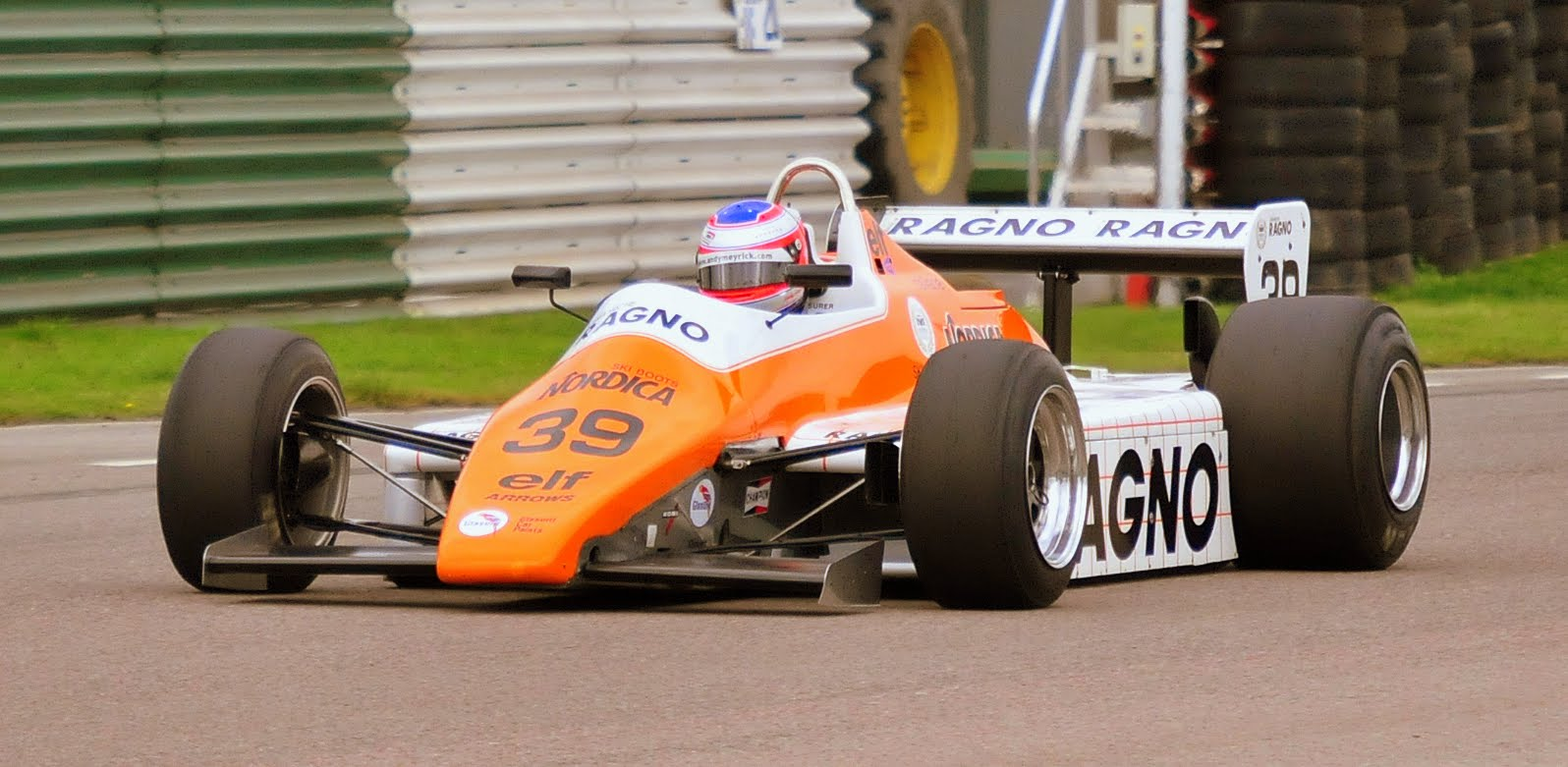
A 1982 Arrows A5 Formula One car, being shaken down during a test session at Mallory Park

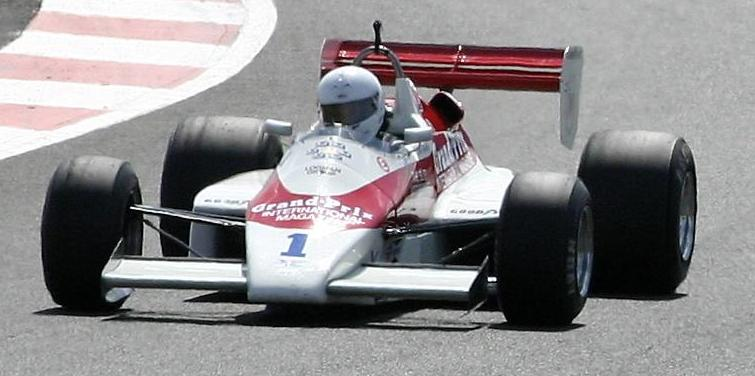
An Arrows A6 from 1983 being tested at Silverstone

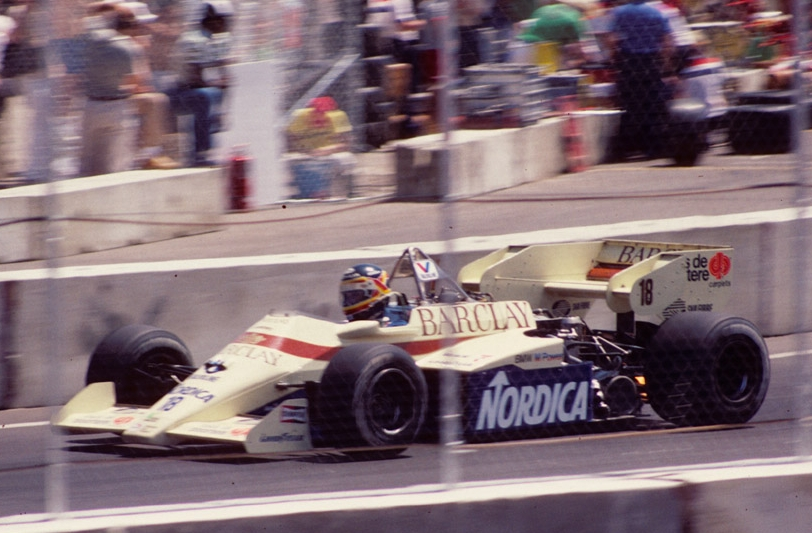
Thierry Boutsen driving at the 1984 Dallas GP

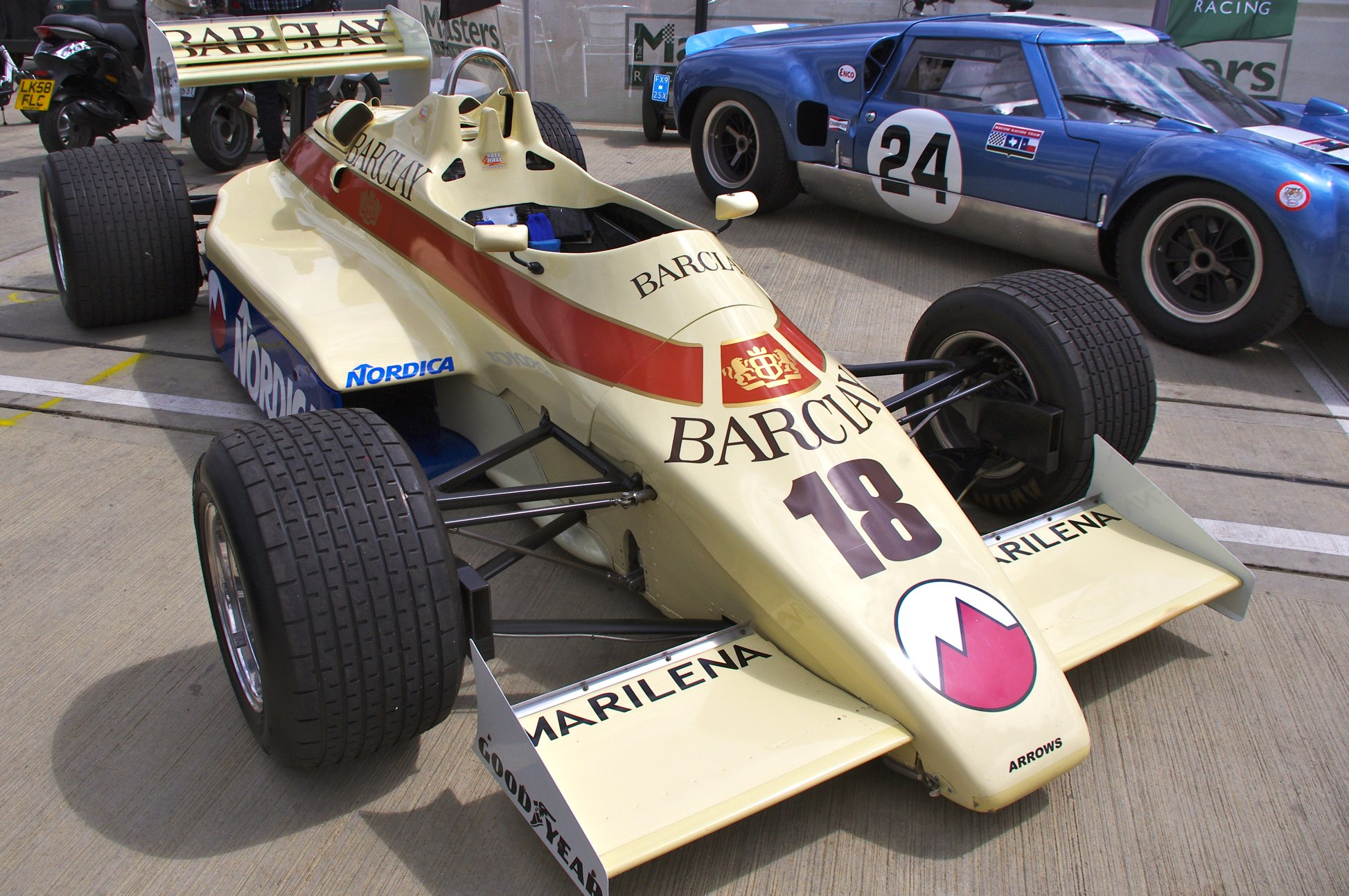
A 1984 Arrows A7 in display at Silverstone Classic

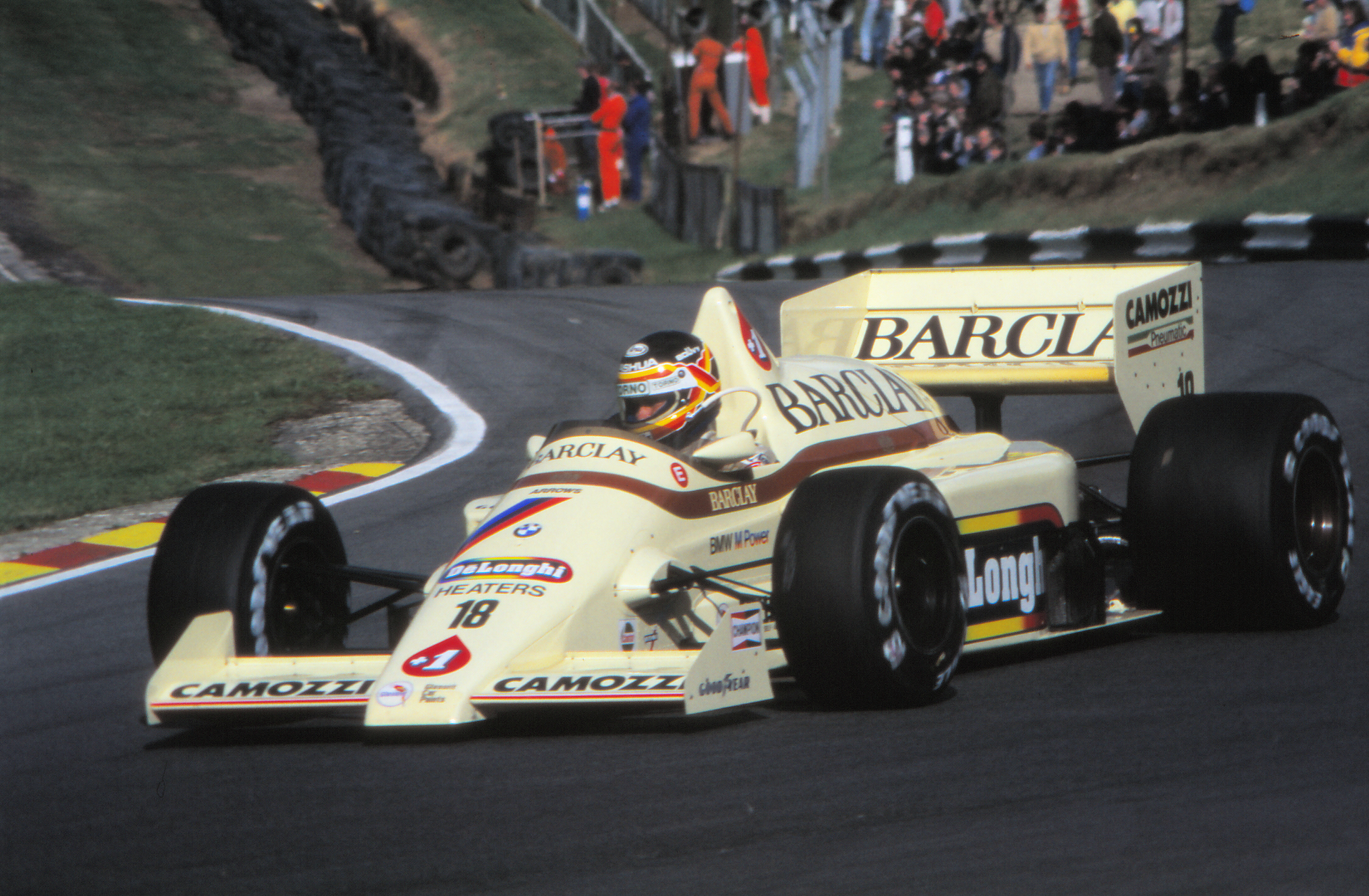
Thirerry Boutsen driving for Arrows at the 1985 European Grand Prix

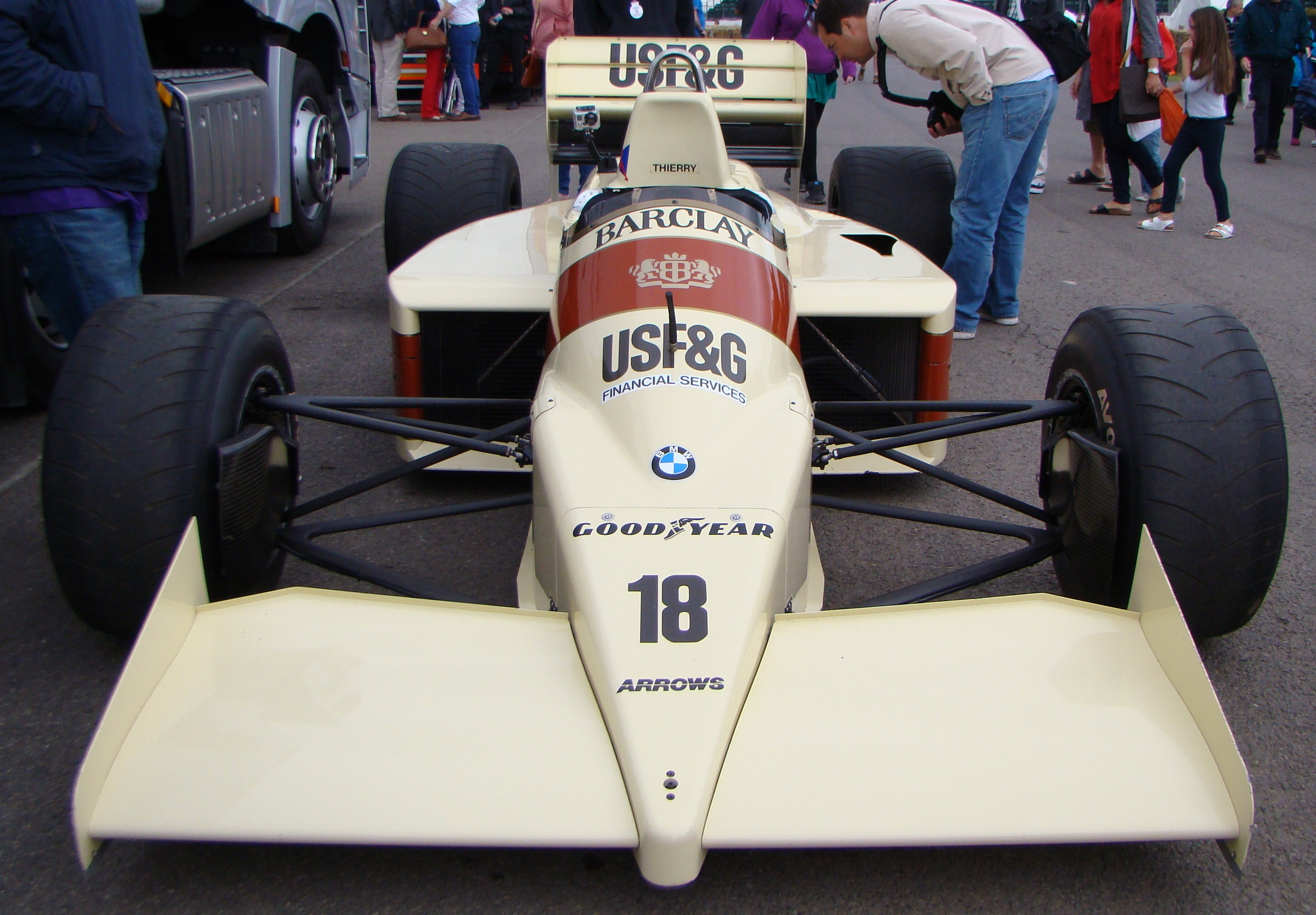
An Arrows A9 from the 1986 season at display at the Goodwood Festival of Speed, 1 July 2012

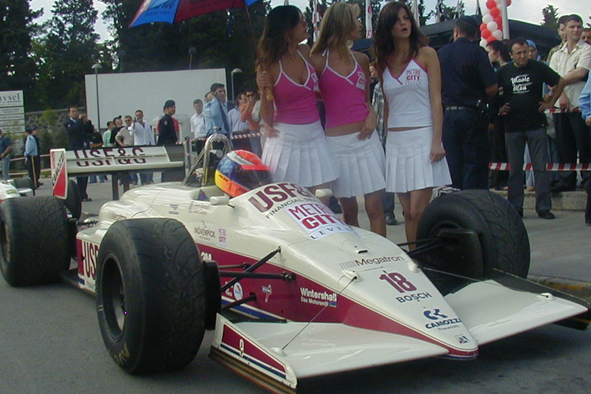
An Arrows A10B from the 1988 season

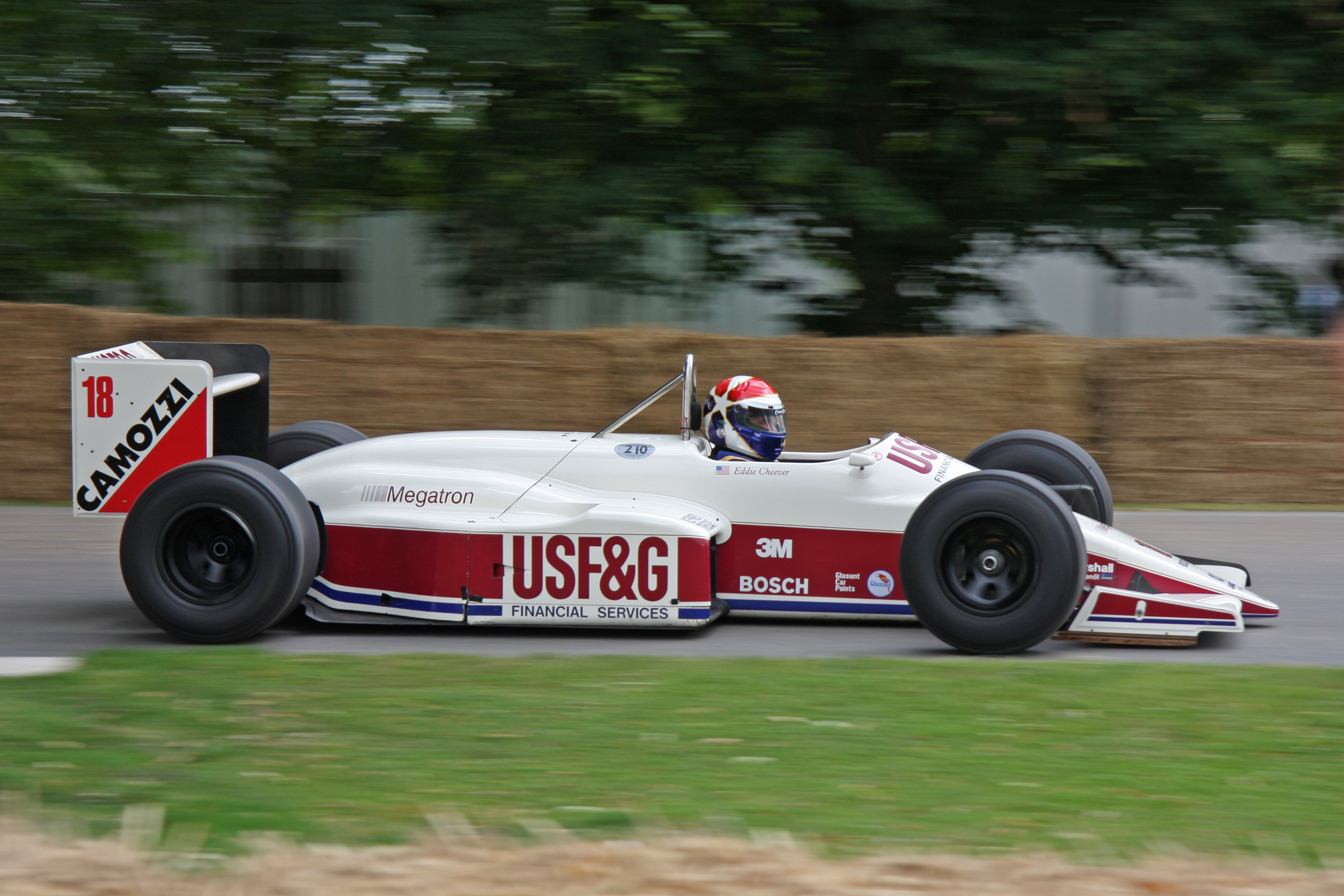
The USF&G-liveried Arrows A10B driven at Goodwood in 2008. This car was driven by Eddie Cheever and Derek Warwick in the 1988 season.

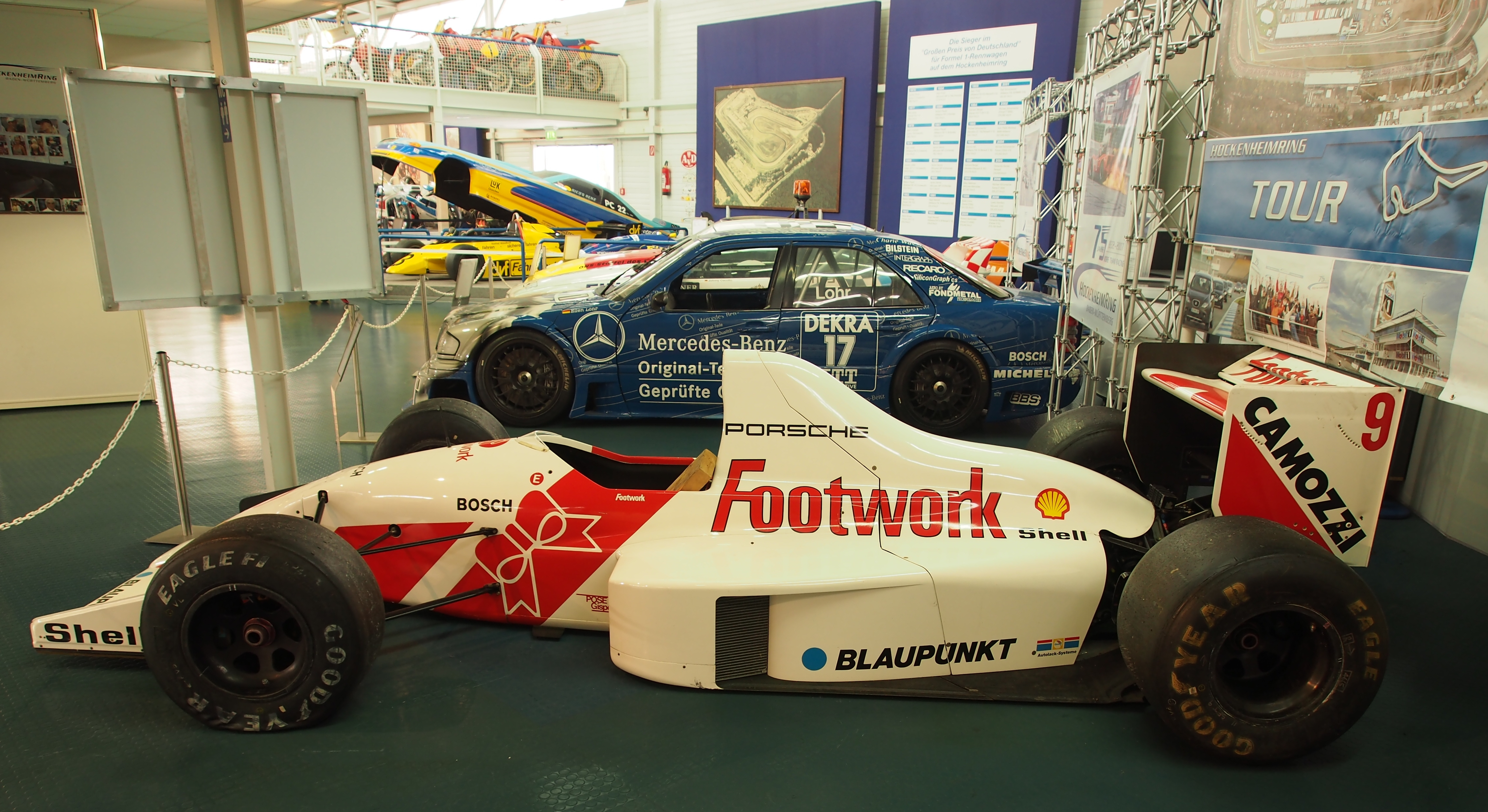
A 1991 A11C Footwork at Hockenheim.

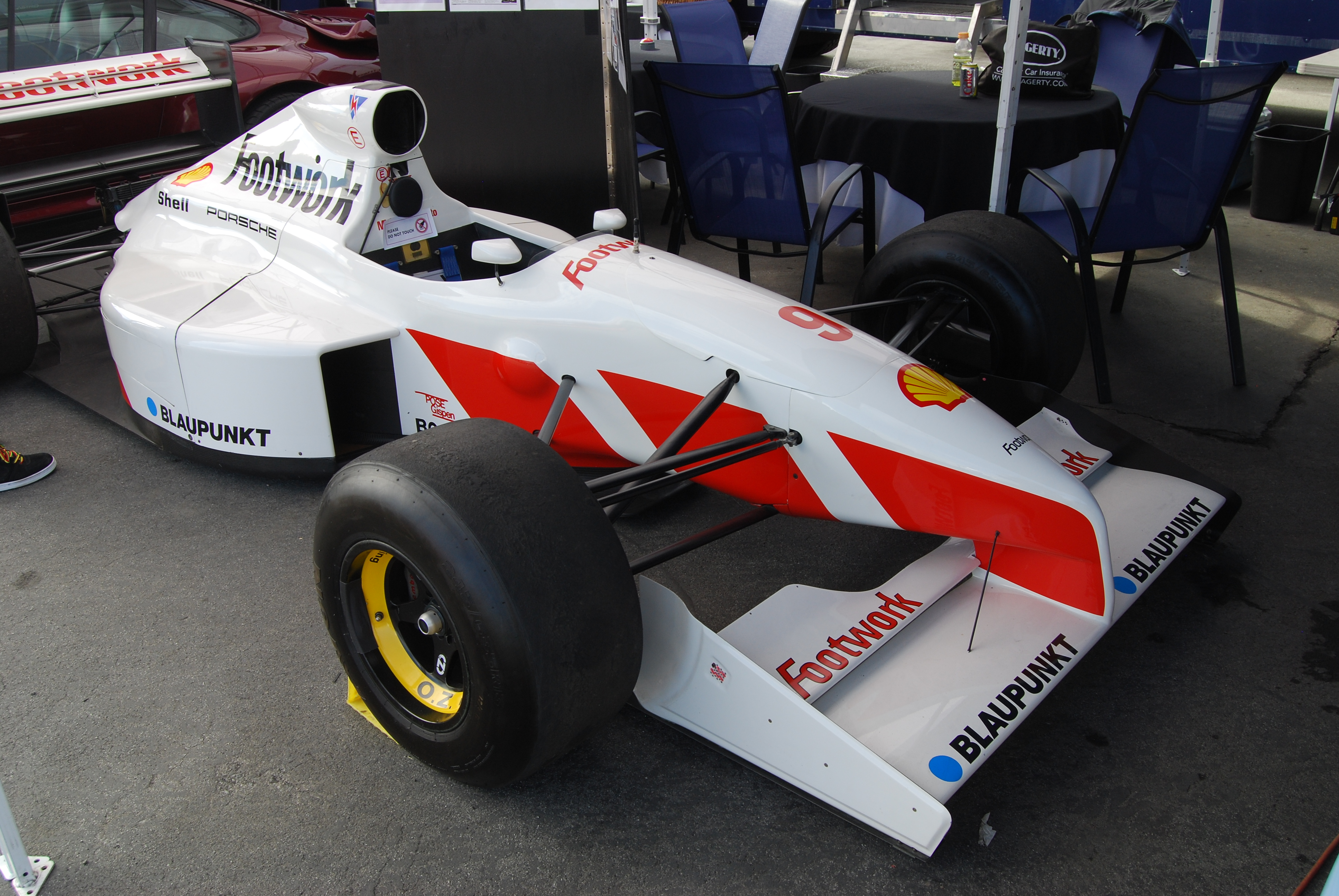
The 1991 FA12 Footwork driven by Michele Alboreto.

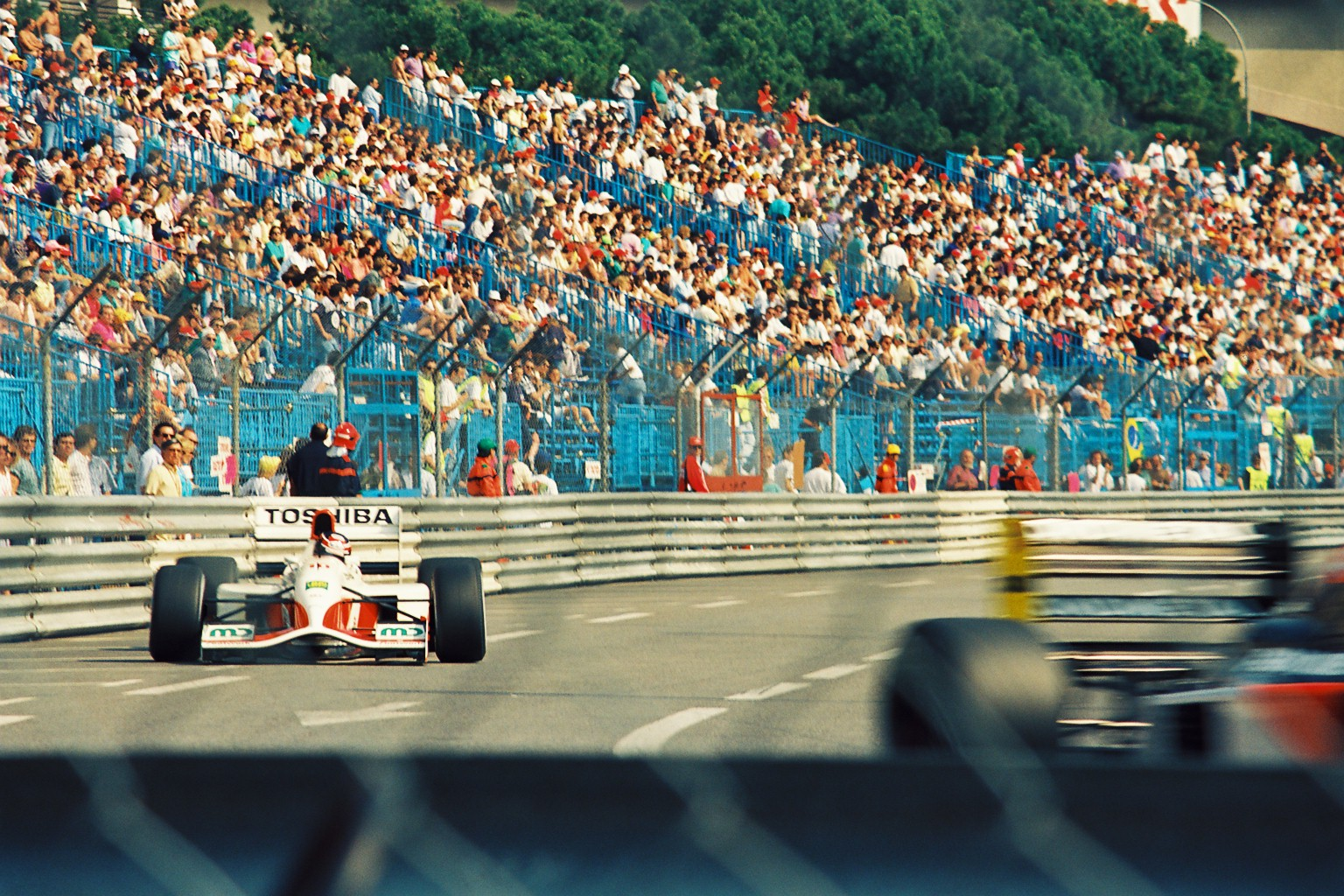
Aguri Suzuki driving for Footwork at the 1992 Monaco Grand Prix.

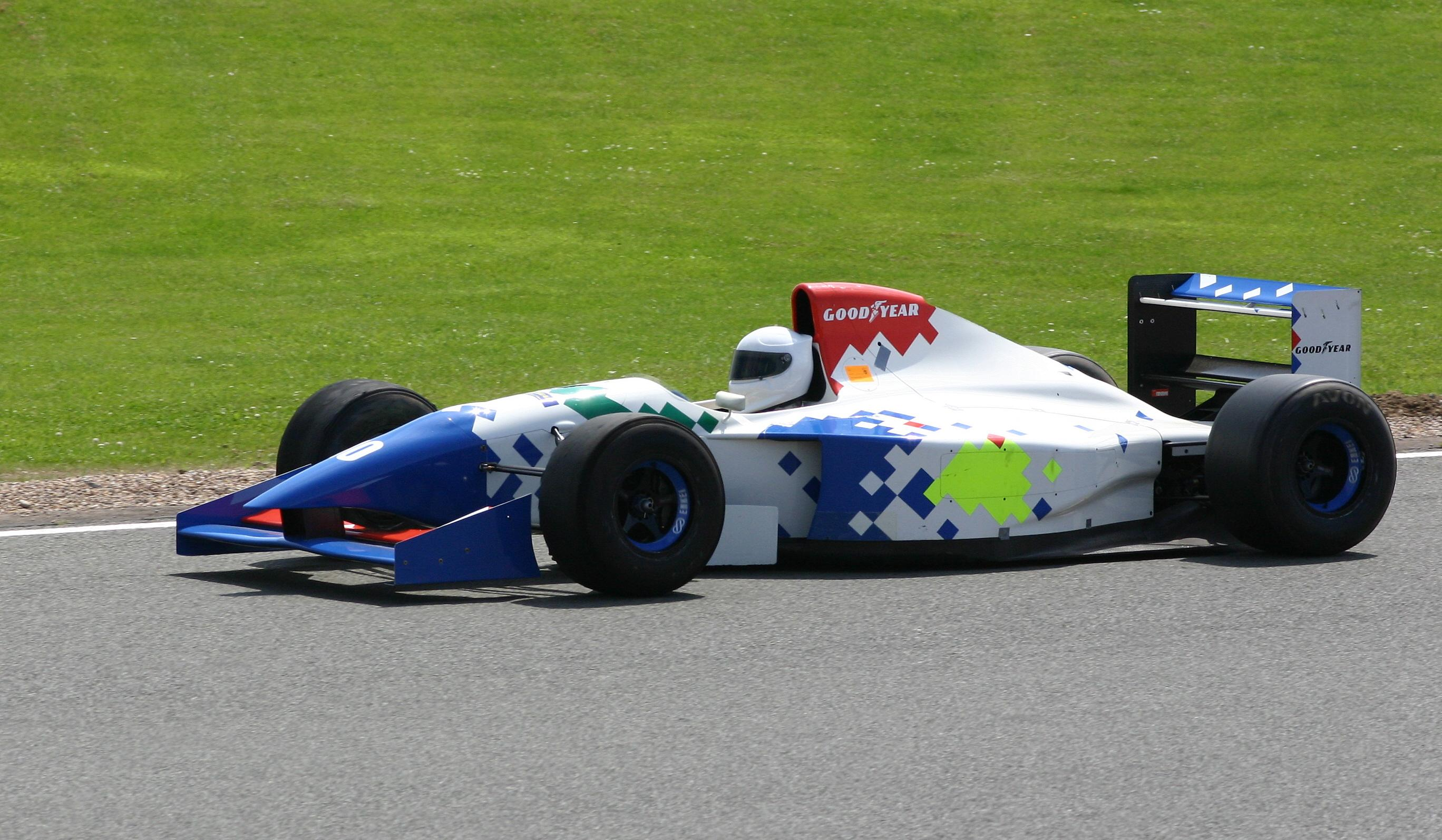
A 1994 FA15 being driven at Silverstone

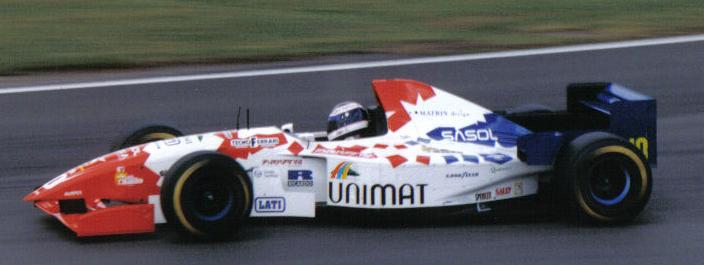
Taki Inoue Driving the Footwork Arrows FA16 at the 1995 British Grand Prix

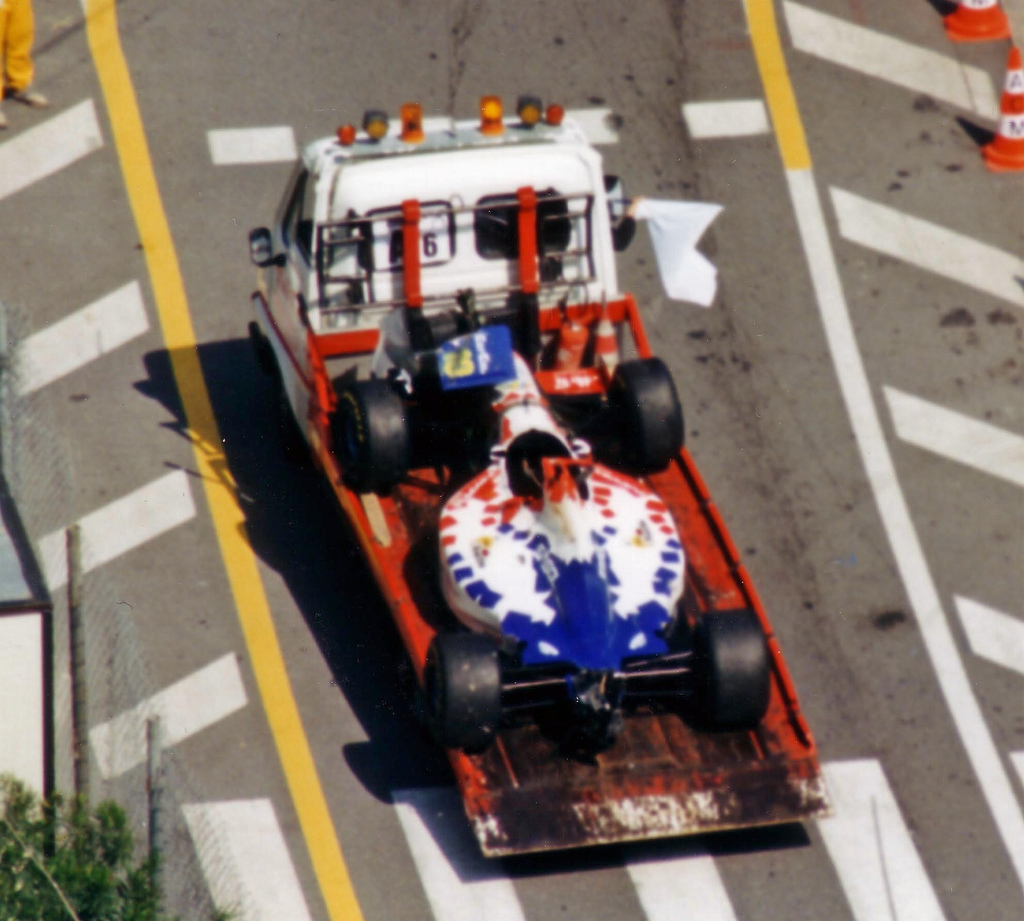
Taki Inoue's FA16 is towed back to the Monaco pits after its bizarre contretemps with the course car.

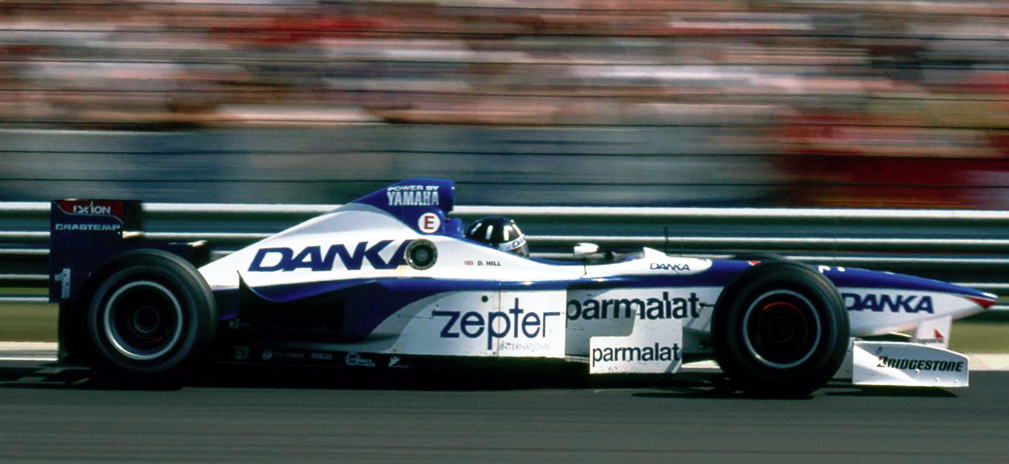
The Danka liveried Arrows A18 driven by Damon Hill at the 1997 Hungarian Grand Prix.

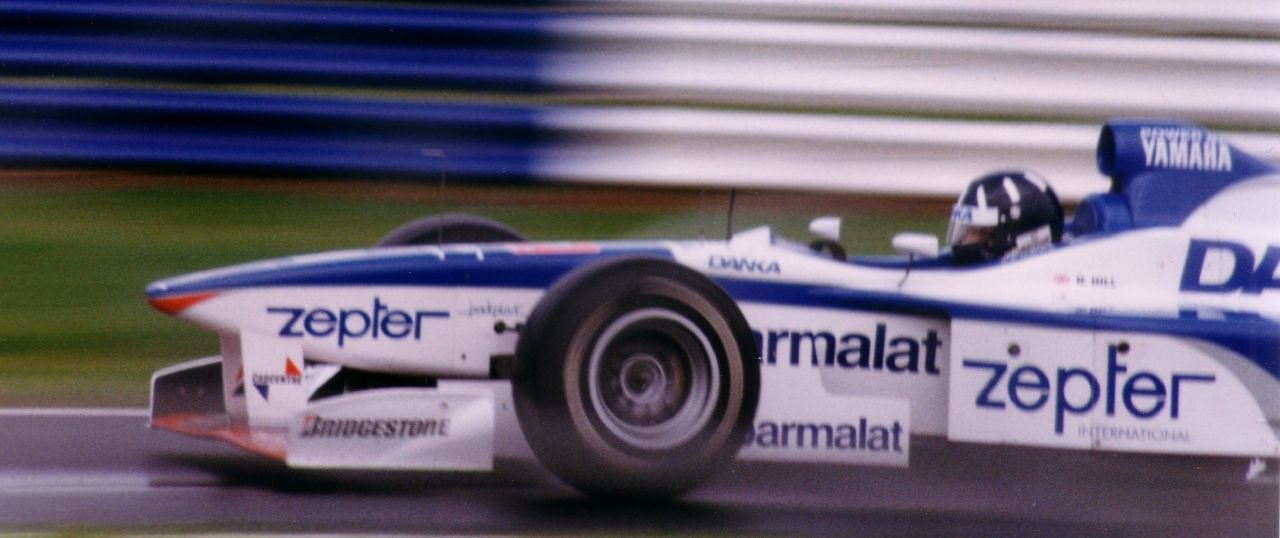
Damon Hill driving for Arrows at the 1997 British Grand Prix

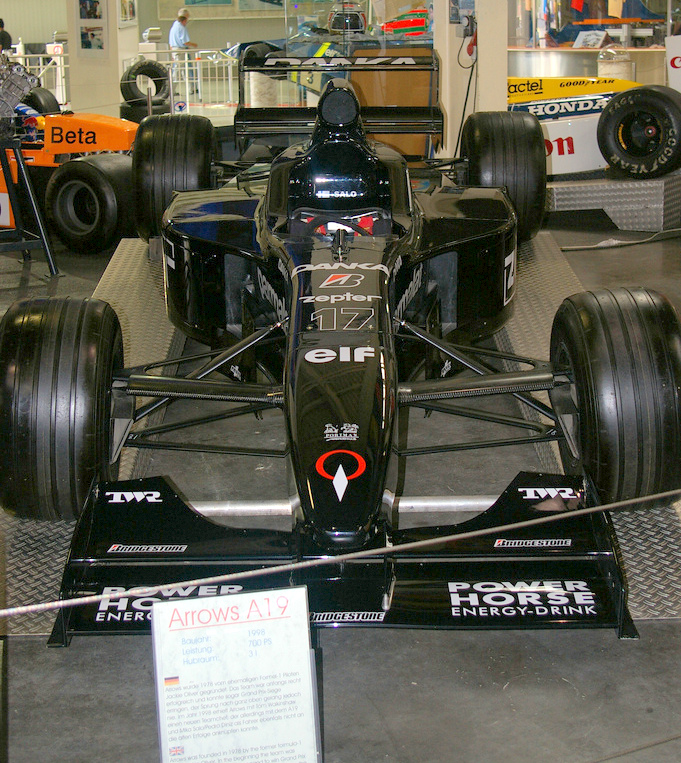
In 1998 Arrows switched from a white and blue livery to a black one. This is Mika Salo's Arrows-Yamaha A19.

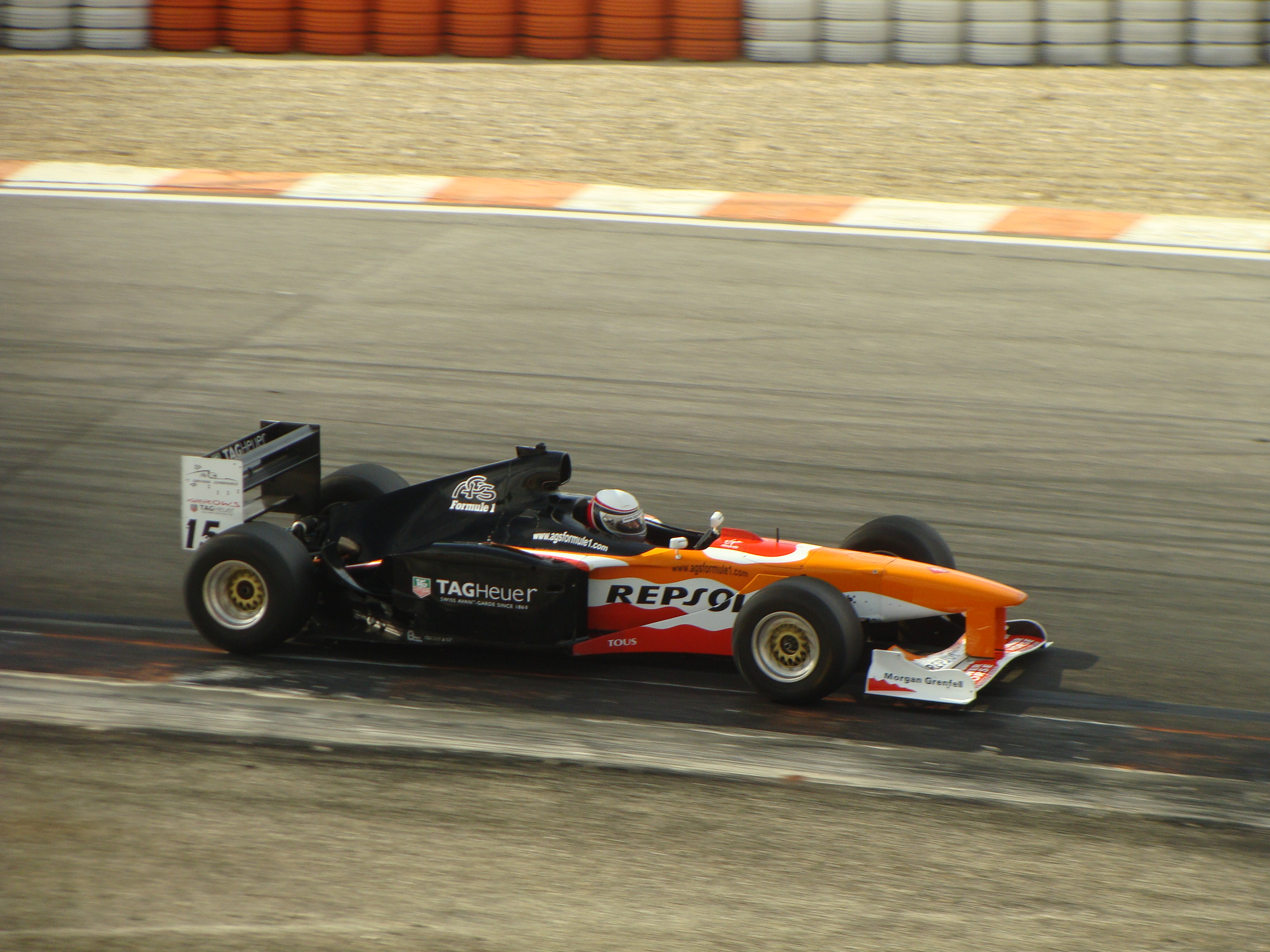
A 1999 Arrows A20 being presented at Historacing Festival Lédenon 2012

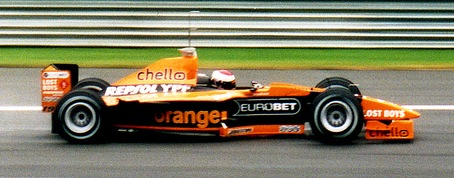
Jos Verstappen driving the Arrows A21 at the 2000 Italian Grand Prix

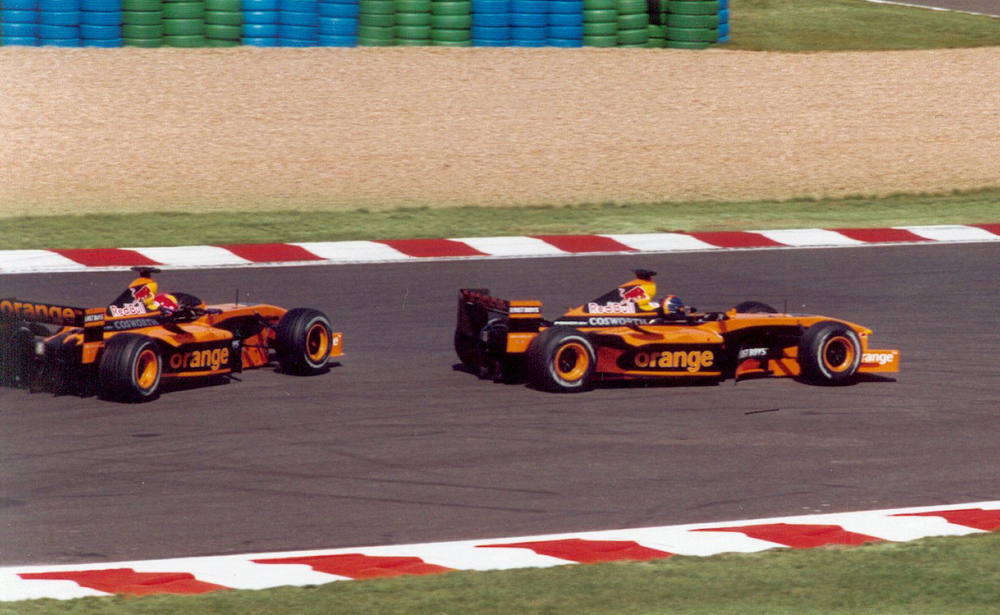
Heinz-Harald Frentzen and Enrique Bernoldi in the Orange liveried Arrows A23s at the 2002 French Grand Prix.

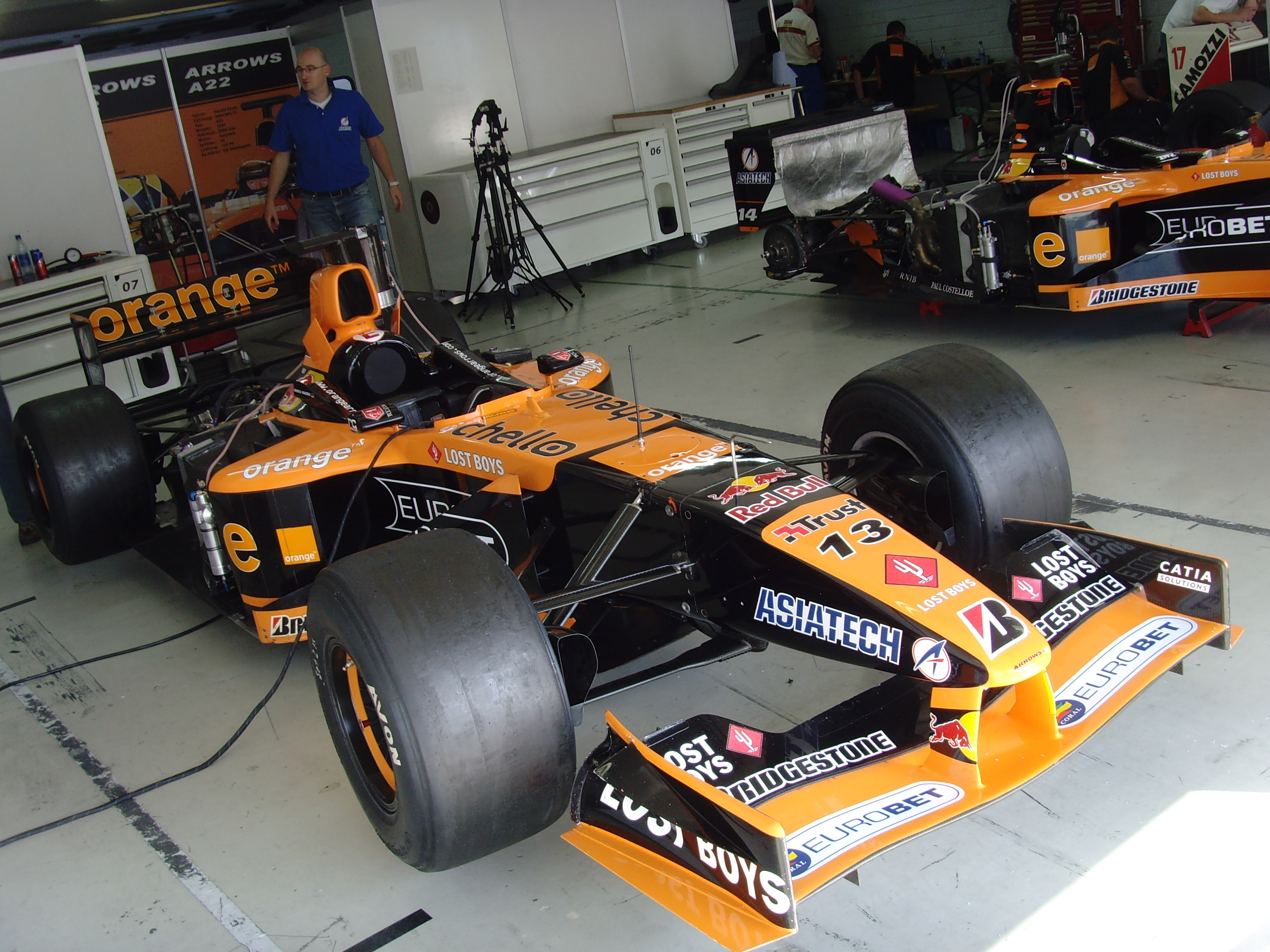
The Arrows A22 in Hockenheim

== Aston Martin ==
Aston Martin competed in Formula One in 1958–59. The team returned in 2021 with the rebranding of Racing Point by Lawrence Stroll.

Year	Main colour(s)	Additional colour(s)	Main sponsor(s)	Additional major sponsor(s)	Notes
1958–1959	British racing green				
2021–2026	British racing green	Magenta (2021), Lime green, Black, White (2025)	Aston Martin, Cognizant (2021–2023), Aramco (2022–2026)	Aston Martin DBX707 (2023–2024), Aston Martin Vantage (2024), Aston Martin Vanquish (2024), Aston Martin Valhalla (2025–2026), BWT (2021), Aqua Mondo (2021), Ravenol (2021), Peroni Brewery (2021–2023), Alpinestars (2021–2022), Pirelli, JCB, IFS (2021–2022), NetApp, SentinelOne (2021–2025), Bombardier (2021–2025), Crypto.com (2021–2023), Epos (2021–2025), Juniper Networks (2022–2025), Oakley (2022–2025), TikTok (2021–2022; 2024–2026), Hugo Boss, XP (2022–2023), Porto Seguro (2023), Citi (2023–2025), Globe-Trotter (2023–2024), AvaTrade (2023–2024), Girard-Perregaux (2023–2025), Velocity Black (2023), Saudia (2023), Banco Master (2023–2024), NexGen Energy (2023–2026), Valvoline (2023–2026), Regent Seven Seas Cruises (2024–2025), Financial Times (2024–2026), Cognizant (2024–2026), Wolfgang Puck (2024), MA'ADEN (2024–2026), Glenfiddich (2024–2026), Arm (2025–2026), Circle8 (2025–2026), Pepperstone (2025–2026), ServiceNow (2025–2026), Elemis (2025–2026), Atlas Air (2025–2026), Coinbase (2025–2026), Xerox (2025–2026), Puma (2025–2026), CoreWeave (2025–2026), Santan Cup (2025), Public (2026), Krown (2026), CoinPayments (2026), Celsius (2026), Breitling (2026), Cognition (2026), UKG (2026), Eight Sleep (2026), HRC/Honda (2026), Cohere (2026), Zscaler (2026), BK8 News (2026), Daiso (2026)	For the 2025 Chinese Grand Prix, the team featured a dedication to Eddie Jordan, who died ahead of the Grand Prix weekend. Jordan was the founder of the team's original descent, Jordan Grand Prix. Aston Martin races special liveries to promote their sponsors. One such example is the Maaden "copper"-style livery for the 2026 Monaco Grand Prix.

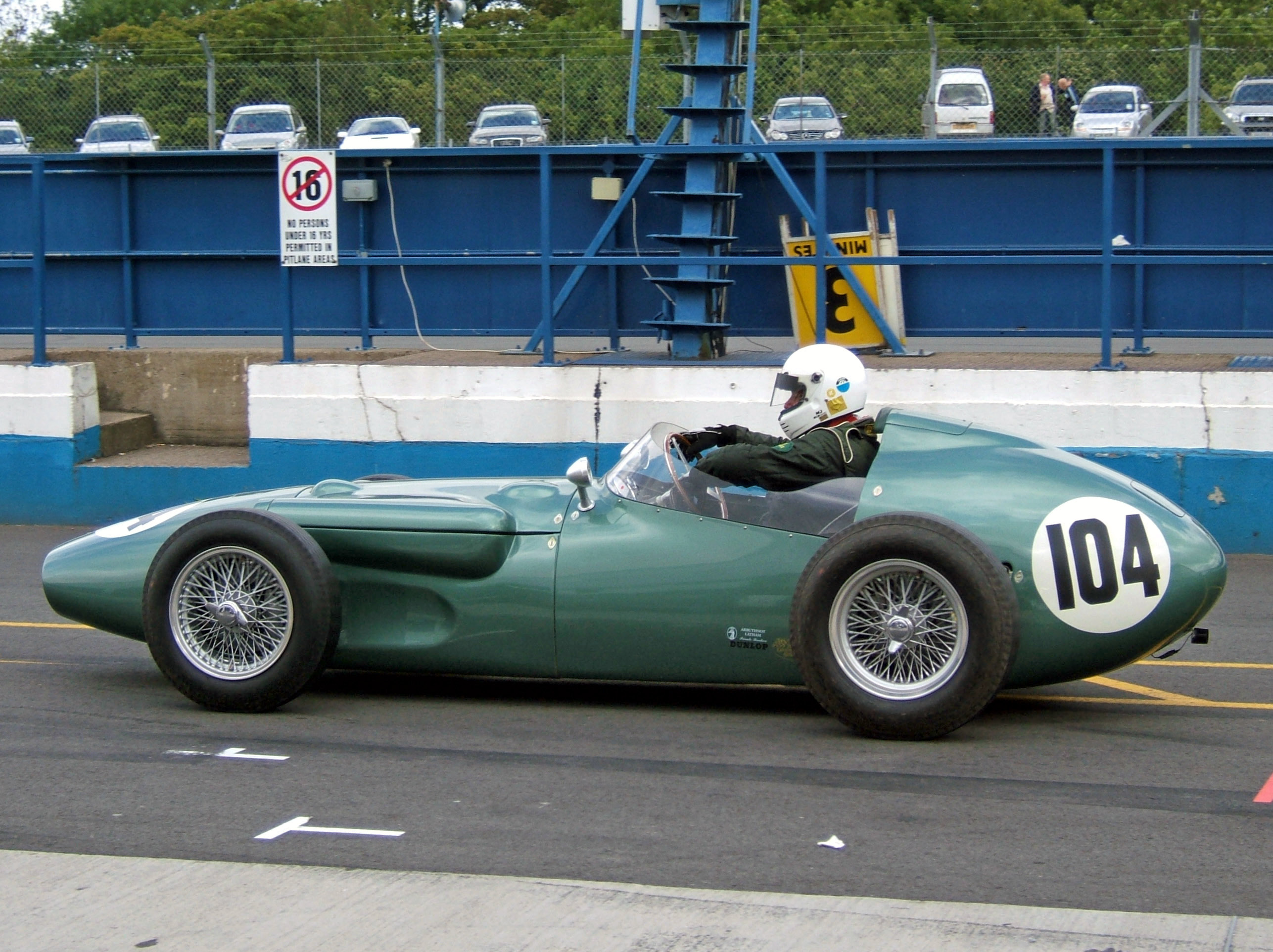
1959: The Aston Martin DBR4 which raced in the 1959 season.

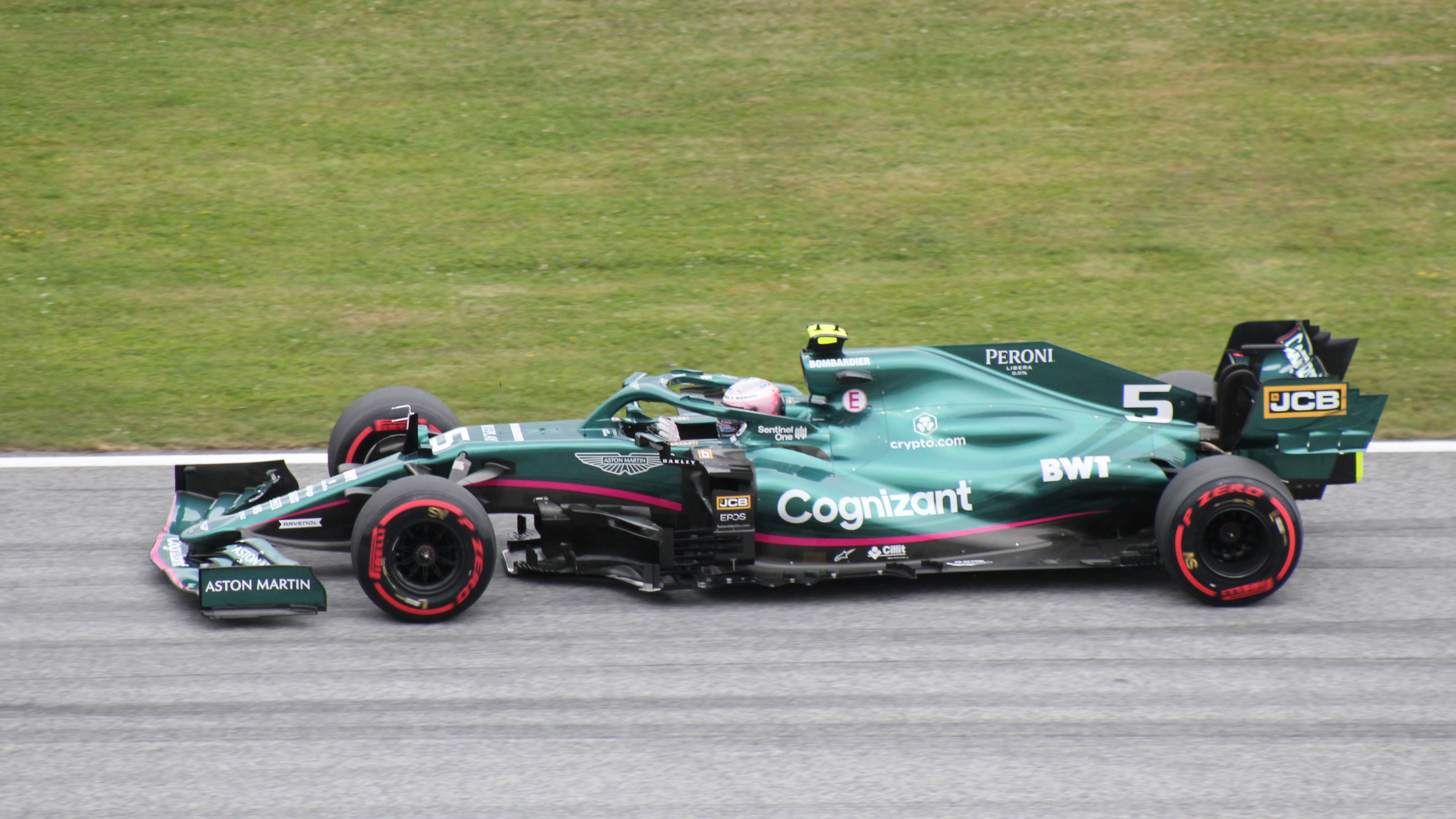
2021: Sebastian Vettel driving the Aston Martin AMR21 at the 2021 Austrian Grand Prix

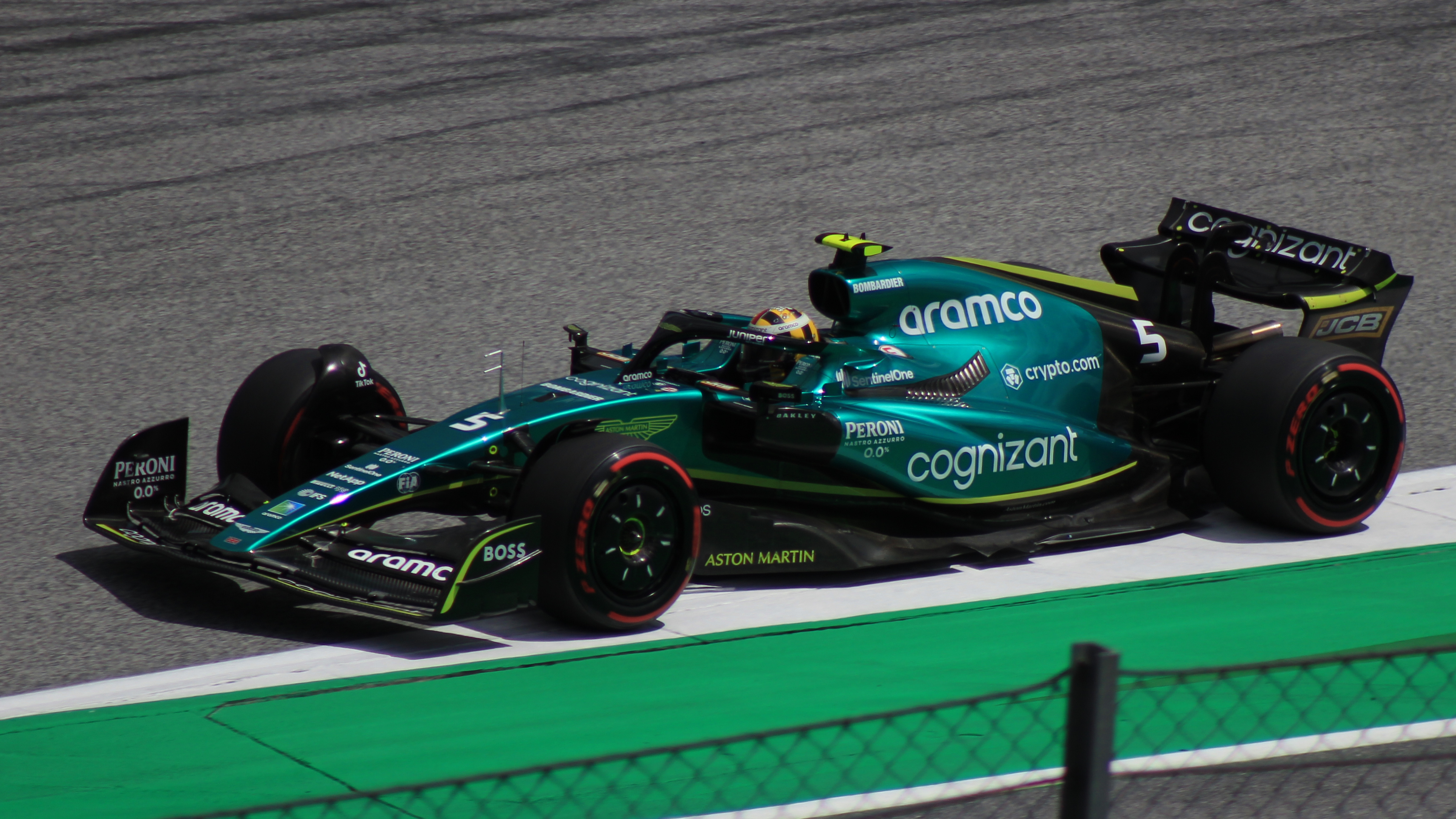
2022: Sebastian Vettel driving the Aston Martin AMR22 at the 2022 Austrian Grand Prix

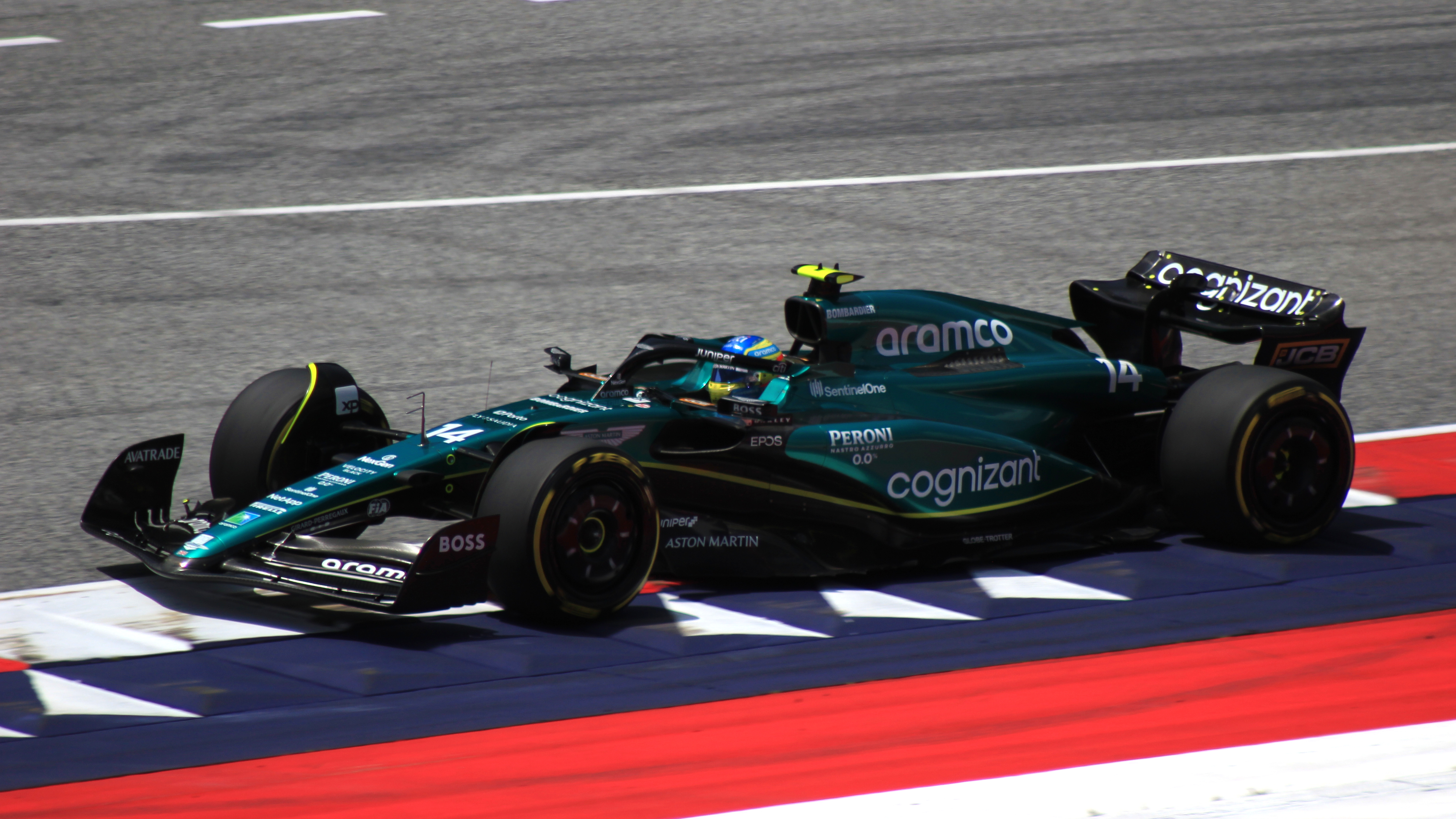
2023: Fernando Alonso driving the Aston Martin AMR23 at the 2023 Austrian Grand Prix

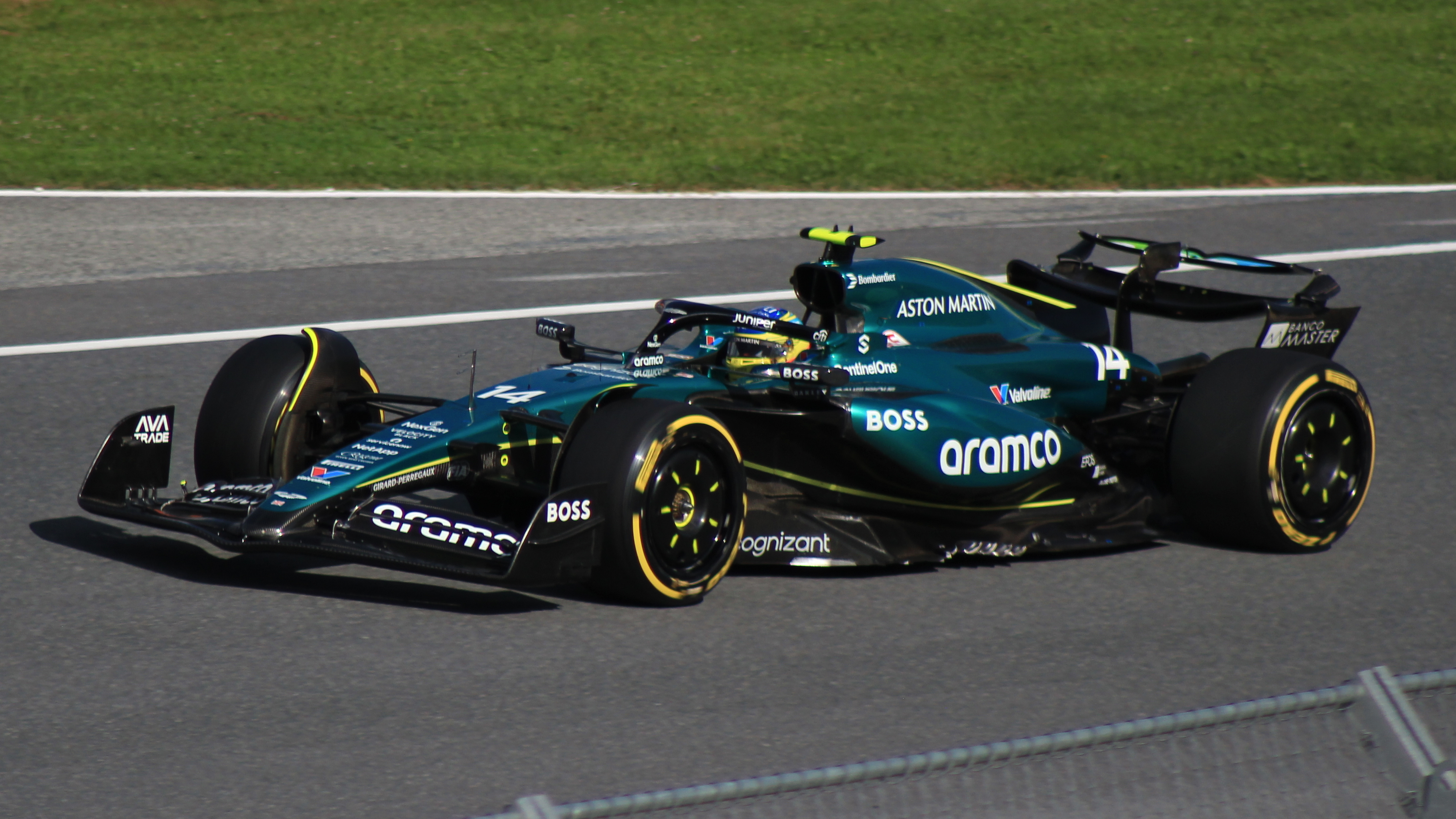
2024: Fernando Alonso driving the Aston Martin AMR24 at the 2024 Austrian Grand Prix

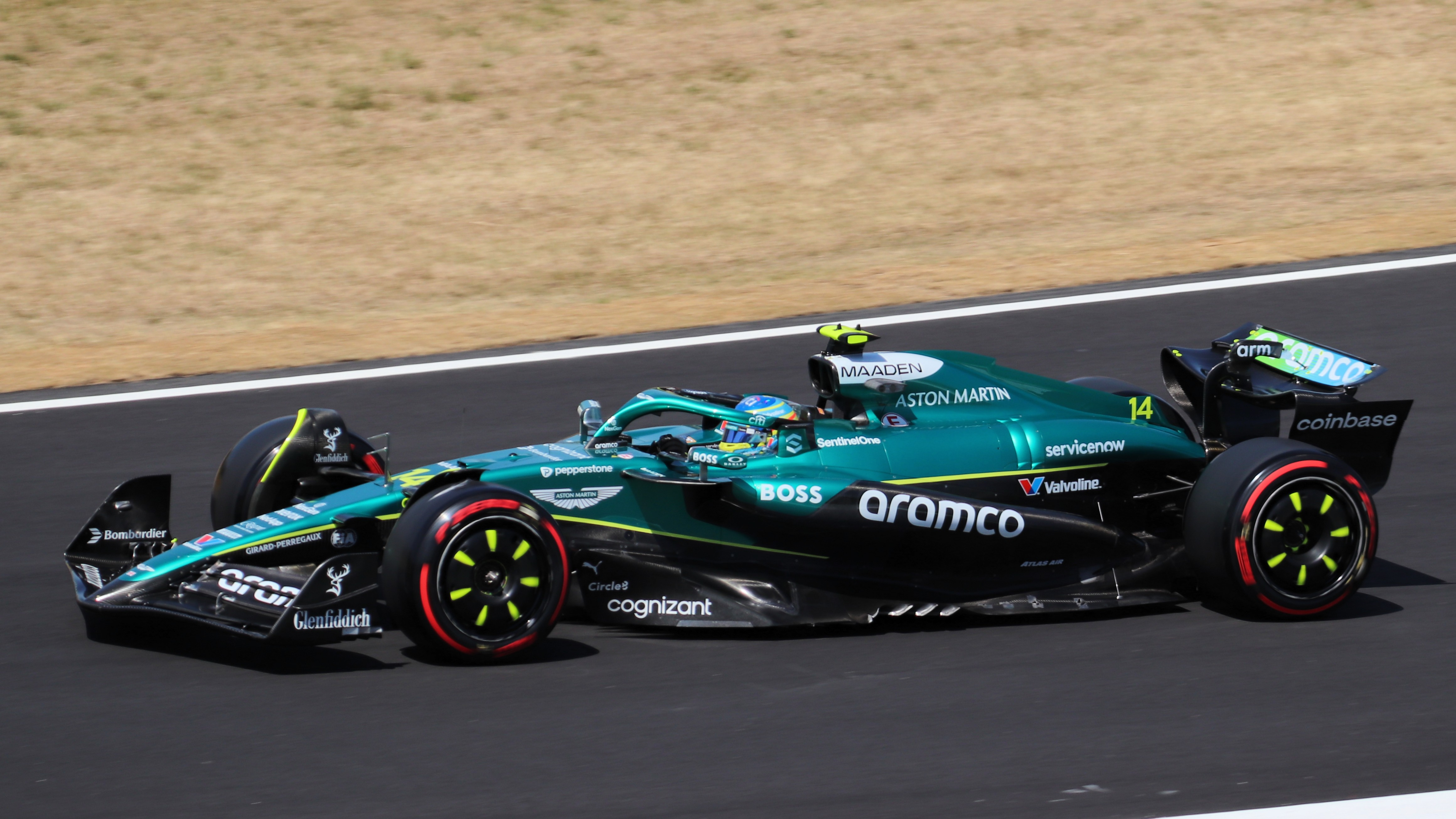
2025: Fernando Alonso driving the Aston Martin AMR25 at the 2025 Japanese Grand Prix

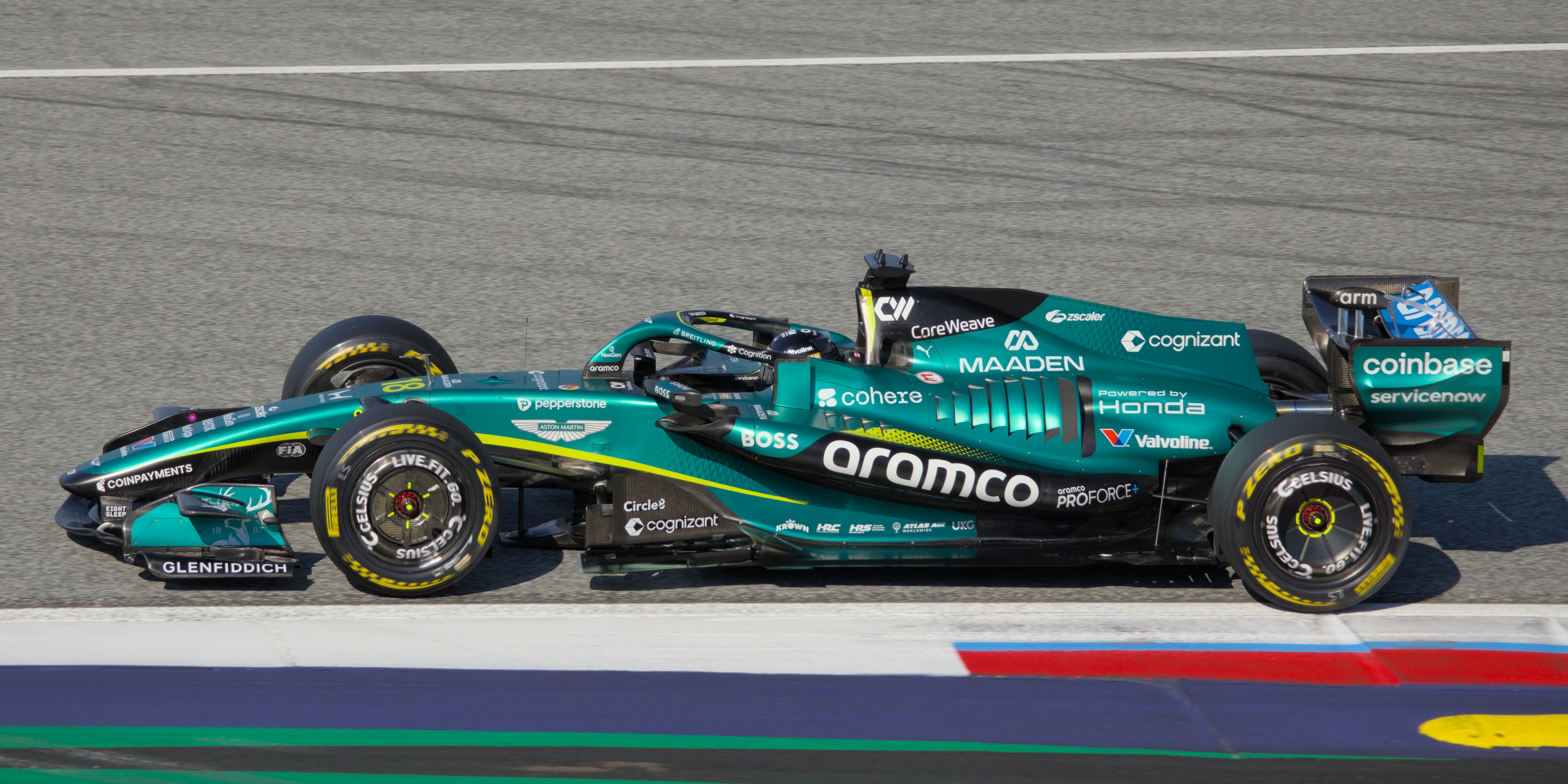
2026: Lance Stroll driving the Aston Martin AMR26 at the 2026 Austrian Grand Prix

== ATS ==
Year	Main colour(s)	Additional colour(s)	Livery sponsor(s)	Additional major sponsor(s)	Notes
1978	Yellow	Black	ATS Wheels	Ford, Champion, Air Press, Shell, Goodyear	
1979	Yellow	Black, Red	ATS Wheels, Arawak, Hotel Freeport	Goodyear, Shell	
1980	Yellow	Black, Red	ATS Wheels, Arawak, Hotel Freeport	Shell, Buler Quartz, Goodyear	
1981	Yellow	White, Black	ATS Wheels	ABBA, Shell, Champion	
1982	Yellow	White, Black	ATS Wheels	Copec, Tecfin, Liqui Moly, Shell, Champion	
1983	Yellow	Black	ATS Wheels	Shell, Goodyear, Steinbock	
1984	Yellow	Black	ATS Wheels	Marilena, Steinbock, Shell, Pirelli	

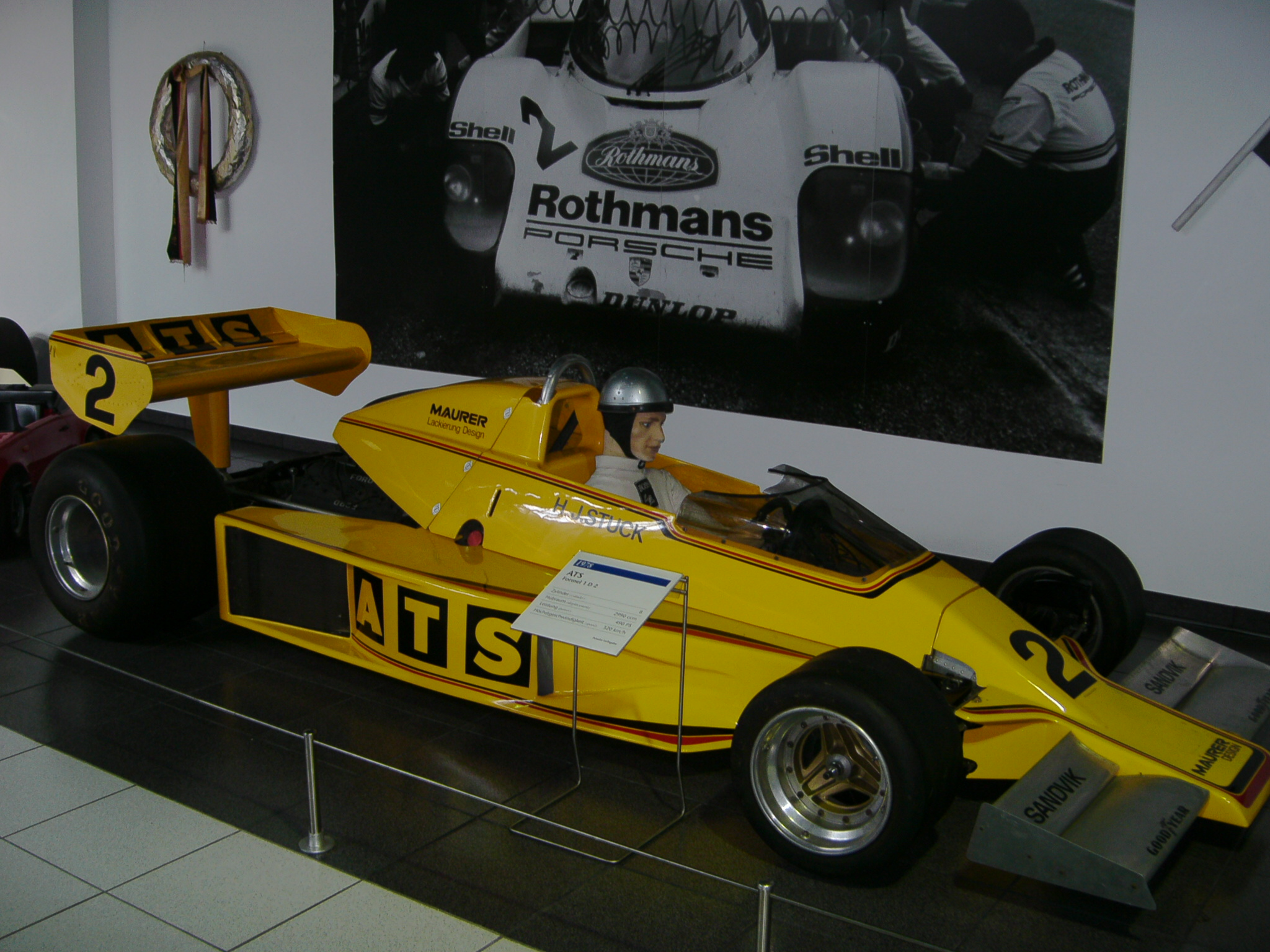
Hans-Joachim Stuck's ATS D2 from 1979 season in display

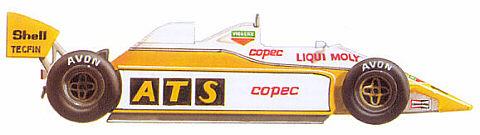
In 1981, ATS was sponsored by the Swedish band ABBA, this was because one of the drivers was Slim Borgudd, ABBA's drummer

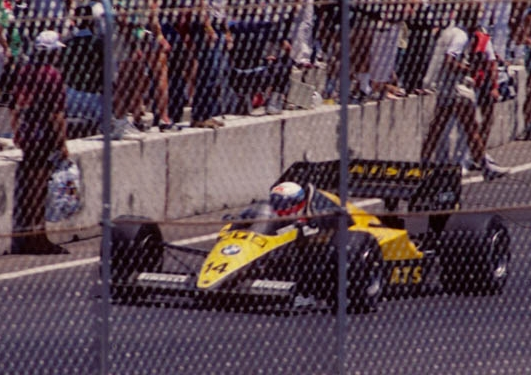
Manfred Winkelhock at the 1984 Dallas GP

== Audi ==
Audi entered Formula One in 2026 through a takeover of Sauber. The company's predecessor, Auto Union, has competed in Grand Prix motor racing.

Year	Main colour(s)	Additional colour(s)	Main sponsor(s)	Additional major sponsor(s)	Mid-season changes
2026	Silver, Red, Black		Audi, Revolut	Visit Qatar, BP, Castrol, Adidas, Nexo, NinjaOne, Gillette, World of Hyatt, Perk, Libertex, Camozzi, Extreme Networks, ElevenLabs, ic! berlin, Pirelli	The red was substituted for yellow for the Monaco Grand Prix. A special vintage Singaporean architectural motif livery will be raced for the Singapore Grand Prix.

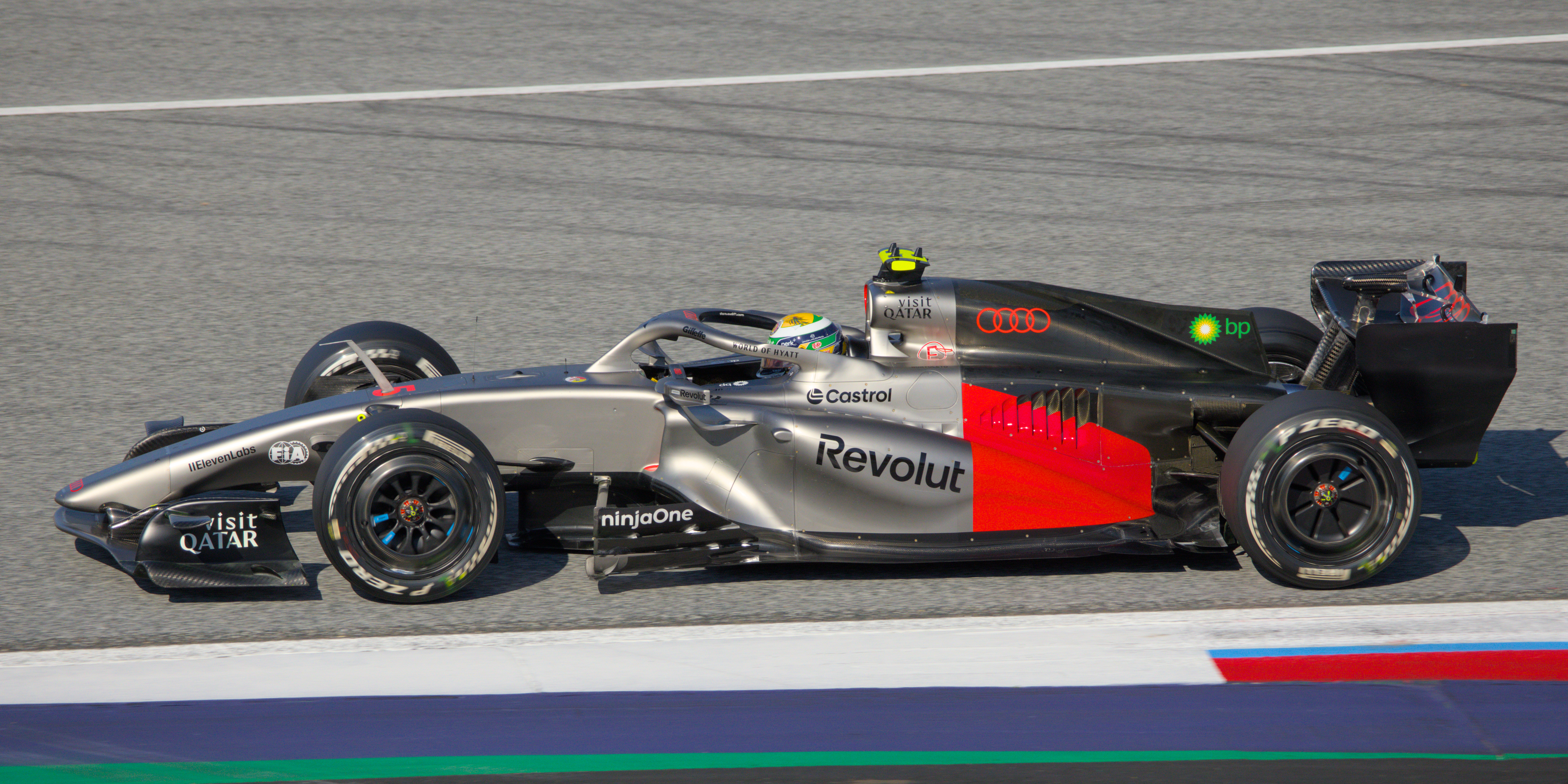
2026: Gabriel Bortoleto driving the Audi R26 at the 2026 Austrian Grand Prix

== Benetton ==
Benetton Formula Ltd. was a Formula One constructor that participated from 1986 to 2001. The team was owned by the Benetton family who run a worldwide chain of clothing stores of the same name. In 2000 the team was purchased by Renault, but competed as Benetton for the 2001 season. In 2002 the team became Renault F1. From 1991 to 1993, Camel sponsored the Benetton team, but, from 1994 to 2001 the main sponsor was Mild Seven.

Year	Main colour(s)	Additional colour(s)	Main sponsor(s)	Additional major sponsor(s)	Non-tobacco/alcohol livery changes
1986–1990	Red, Green	White (1986), Blue, Yellow	Benetton Group, Sisley (1986/1988)	Pirelli (1986), Goodyear (1987–1990), Riello, Frizerga, 7-Up, Autopolis, Mobil 1, Eurobags, BMW (1986), Flying Tigers Airlines, Ford (1987–1990), Steinbock, Gillette (1989), The European, Camel, Gancia, Sanyo (1989–1990), Technocast	"Camel" letters were replaced by the Camel logo (1988–1990). A national flag of the country in which the team competes (Benetton B186 car in 1986).
1991	Yellow	Blue, Green	Camel	Ford, Mobil 1, Sanyo, "United Colors Of Benetton" (Benetton Group), Autopolis, Pirelli	"Camel" letters were covered with blue gaps, or replaced by the Camel logo, or with "Benetton"
1992	Yellow	Green	Camel	Ford, Mobil 1, Sanyo, "United Colors Of Benetton" (Benetton Group), Goodyear, Brembo, USAG Tools	"Camel" letters were covered with blue gaps, or replaced by the Camel logo, or with "Benetton"
1993	Yellow	Dark Green	Camel	Ford, Elf, Sanyo, Technogym, Denim, "United Colors Of Benetton" (Benetton Group), Goodyear	"Camel" letters were covered with blue gaps, or replaced by the Camel logo, or with "Benetton"
1994	Blue	Green	Mild Seven	Ford, Elf, Sanyo, Oracle, Polti, "Benetton Sportsystem" (Benetton Group)	"Mild Seven" was replaced with "Benetton"
1995	Blue	White, Dark Blue, Yellow	Mild Seven	Bitburger, Renault, Oracle, Elf, Kickers, RTL, "Benetton Sportsystem" (Benetton Group)	"Mild Seven" was replaced with "Benetton" or "Moto Sport" and "Bitburger" was replaced with "Drive Alcoholfrei". An Italian flag as a mark of the nationality of team's owner Benetton Group (Benetton B195 car).
1996	Blue	White	Mild Seven	FedEx, Renault, Prince Sports, Kingfisher, Elf, Cesare Paciotti, Hype Energy, Nordica, "Benetton Sportsystem" (Benetton Group)	"Mild Seven" was replaced with "Benetton". An Italian flag as a mark of the team's nationality (1996–1997).
1997	Blue	White	Mild Seven	FedEx, Renault, Agip, Prince Sports, Akai, Korean Air, Hype Energy, Hitachi, Gillette	"Mild Seven" was replaced with "Benetton". An Italian flag as a mark of the team's nationality (1996–1997).
1998	Blue	White	Mild Seven	FedEx, Agip, Akai, Hitachi, Korean Air, Gillette	"Mild Seven" was replaced with "Benetton". An Italian flag as a mark of the team's nationality (1996–1997).
1999	Blue	White	Mild Seven	FedEx, Agip, Supertec, Playlife, D2 Mannesmann, Bridgestone, Marconi, Korean Air, Hewlett-Packard, Magneti Marelli	"Mild Seven" was replaced with "Benetton". An Italian flag as a mark of the team's nationality (1996–1997).
2000	Blue	White	Mild Seven	Agip, Supertec, D2 Mannesmann, Bridgestone, Marconi, Korean Air, Sportal, Strabila, OMB, Charmilles, Action, Novell, Magneti Marelli, AEA Technology	"Mild Seven" was replaced with "Benetton". An Italian flag as a mark of the team's nationality (1996–1997).
2001	Blue	White	Mild Seven	Marconi, Elf, Renault, Korean Air, Vodafone, PlayStation 2, Charmilles, Action, Novell, Magneti Marelli, Michelin, Catia Solutions, AEA Technology	"Mild Seven" was replaced with "Benetton" (on team members clothing and rear wing's front side), "Renaultsport" on rear wing (rear side), "Fisico" on Fisichella's car (on engine body) and "Jenson" on Button's car (on engine body)

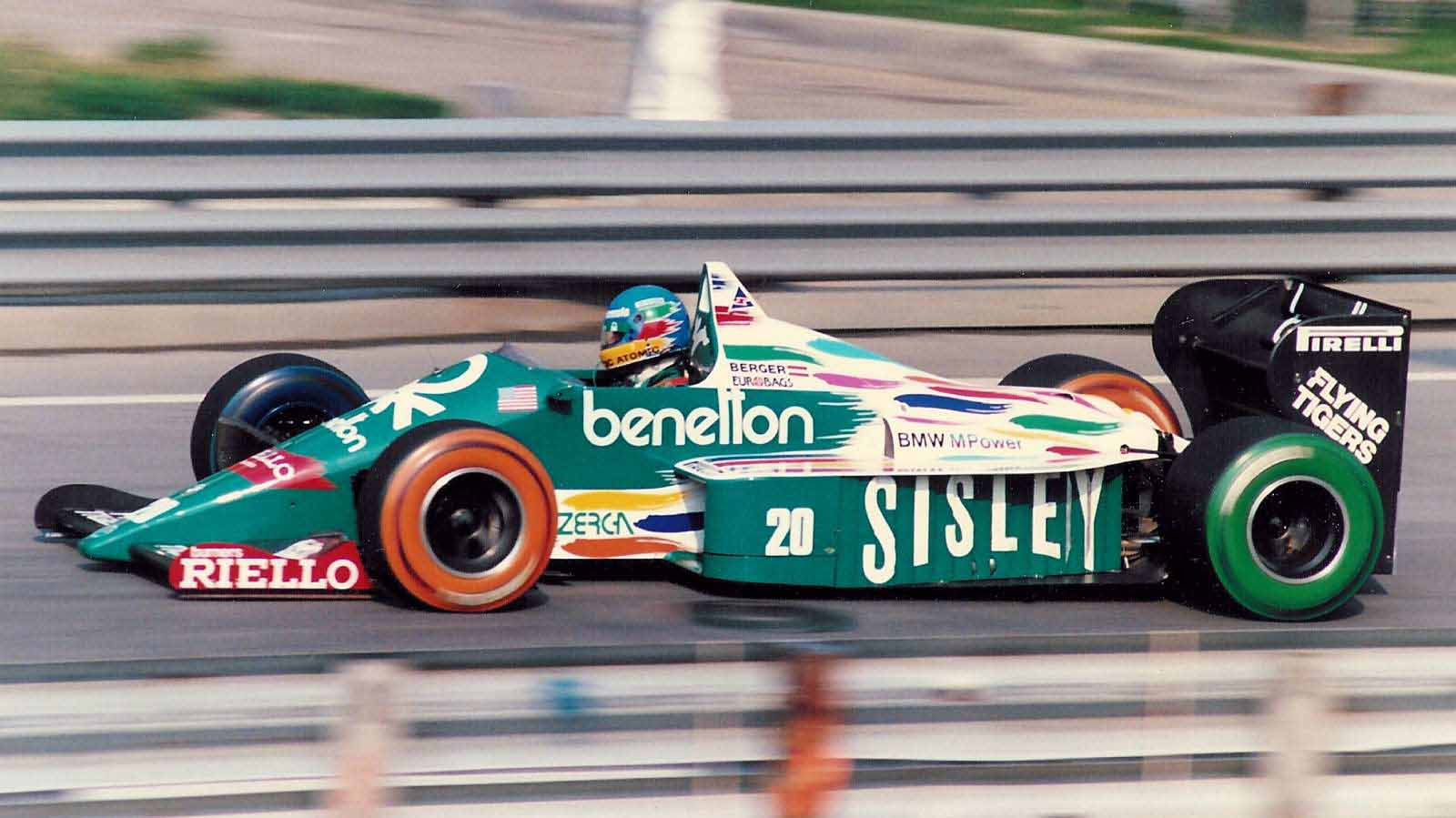
In its first year, Benetton raced in green livery with Sisley (a Benetton brand) and Benetton as sponsors, this is Gerhard Berger racing for Benetton at Detroit in 1986

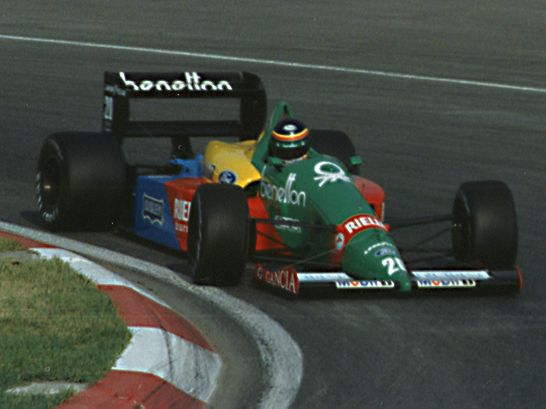
Thierry Boutsen driving for Benetton at the 1988 Canadian Grand Prix

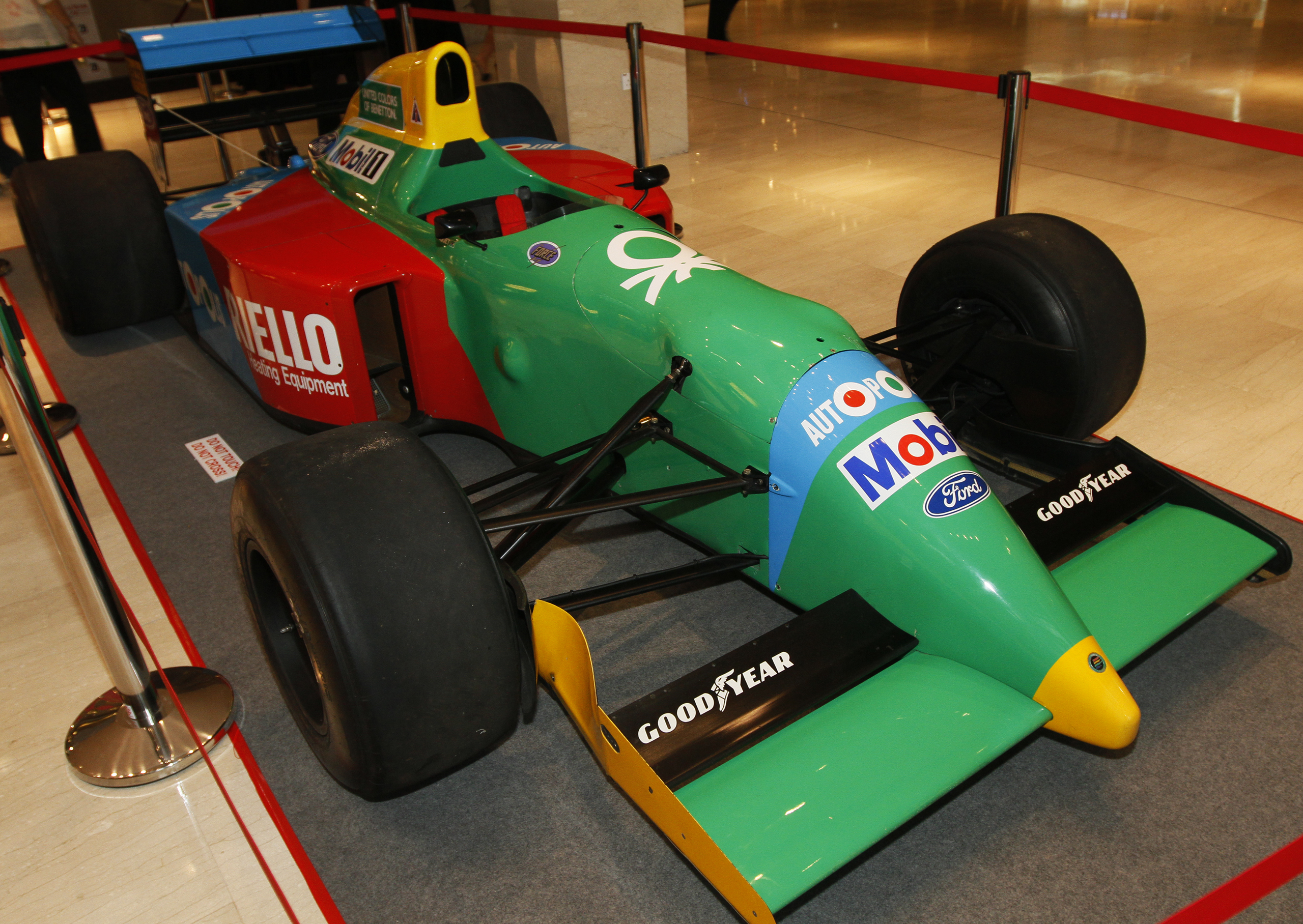
1990 Benetton B190 on display

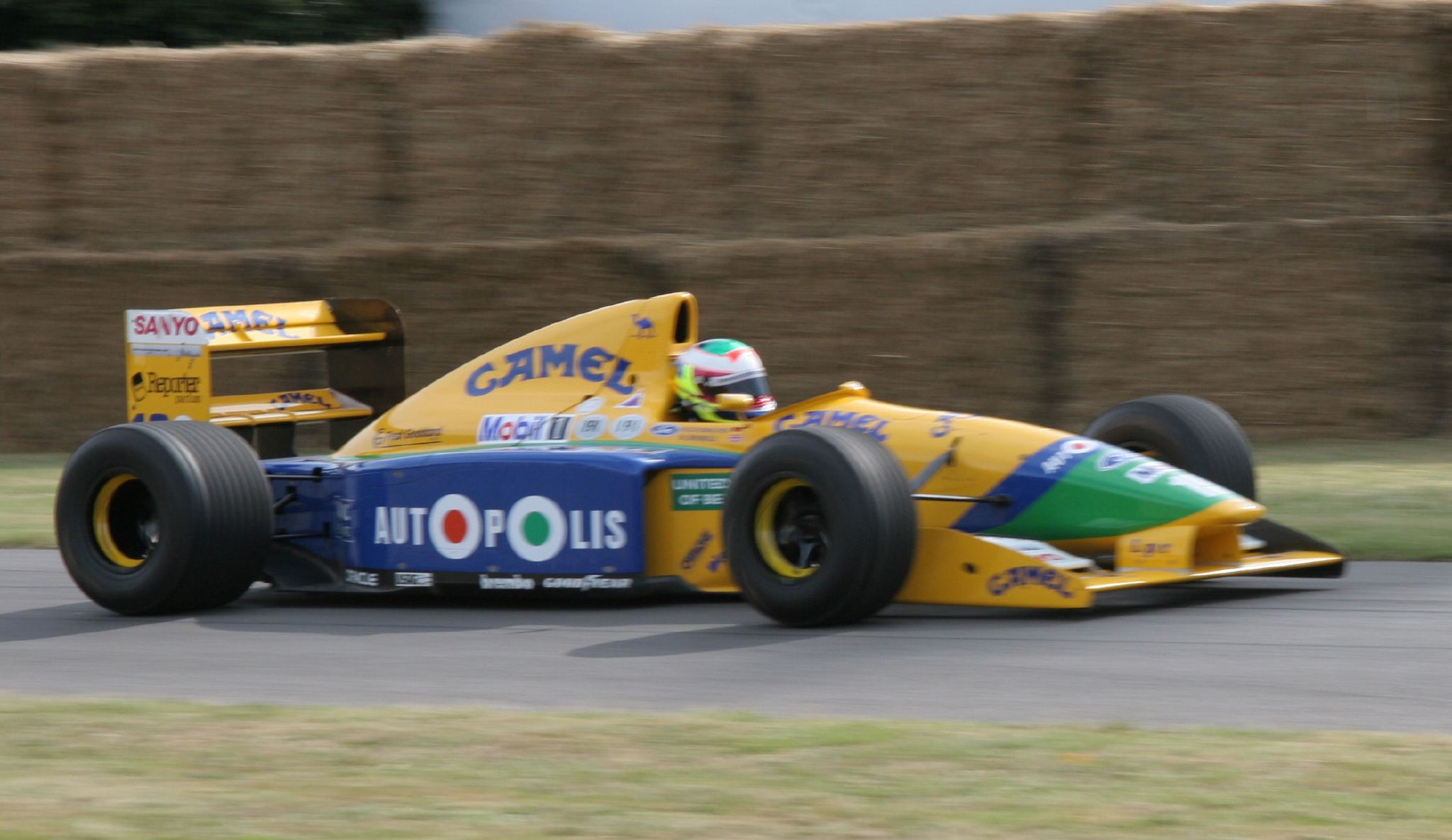
From 1991 to 1993, Camel sponsored benetton, here is the B191 from 1991 season being demonstrated at Goodwood Festival of Speed in 2006

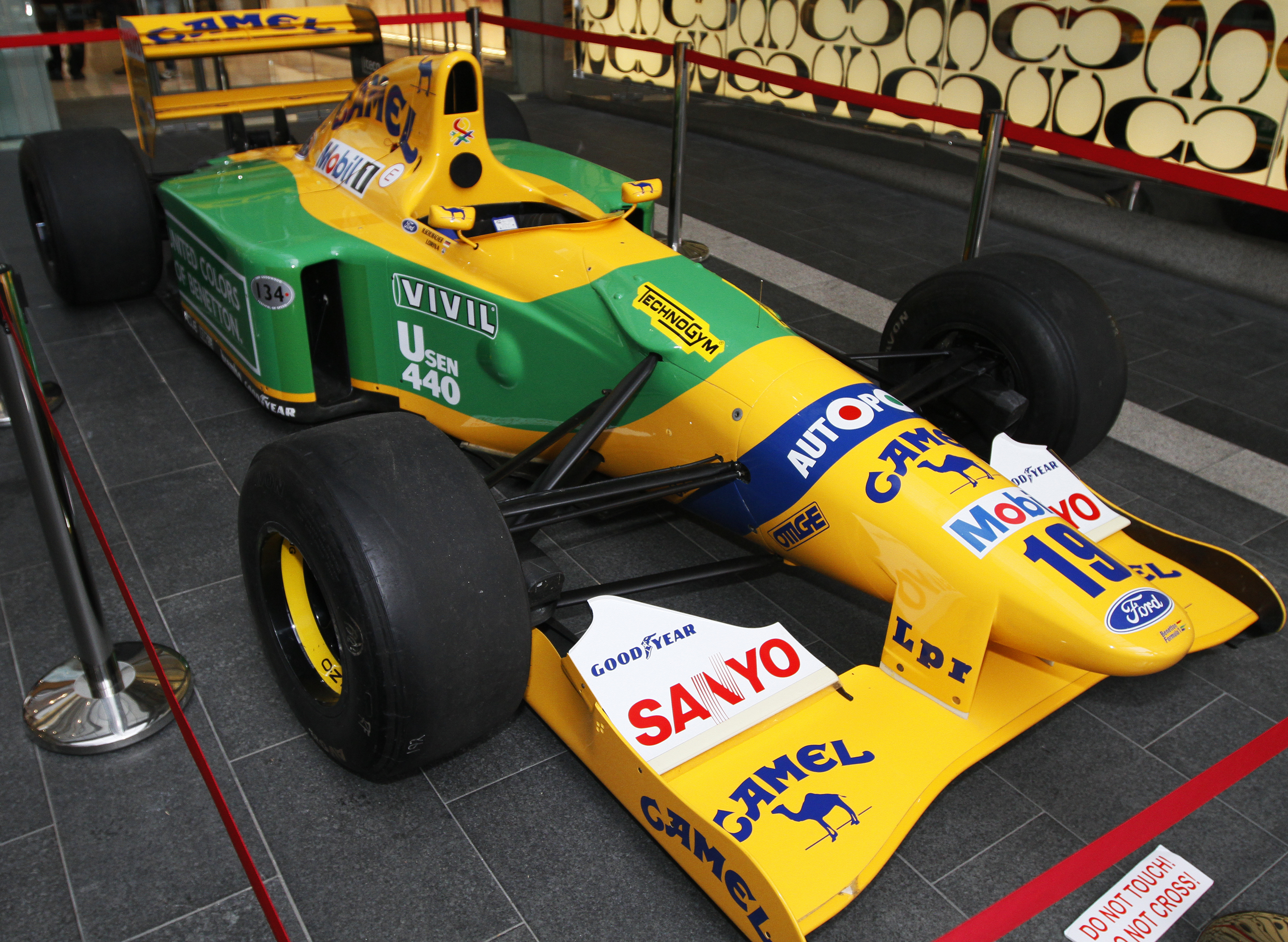
A Benetton B192 painted in its Camel livery

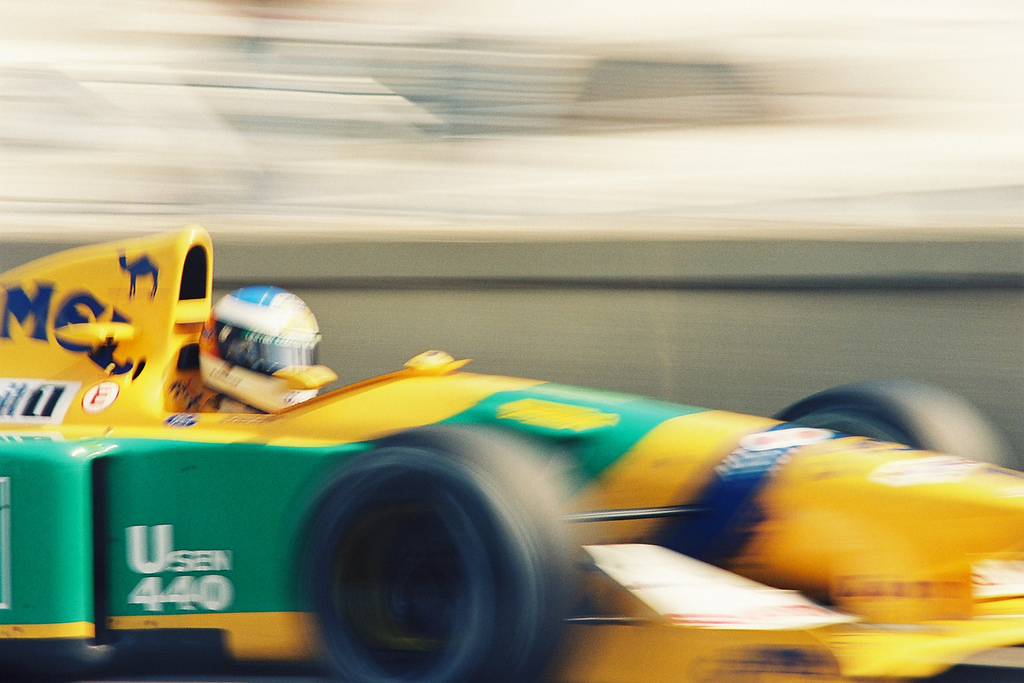
Michael Schumacher driving for Benetton at the 1992 Monaco GP

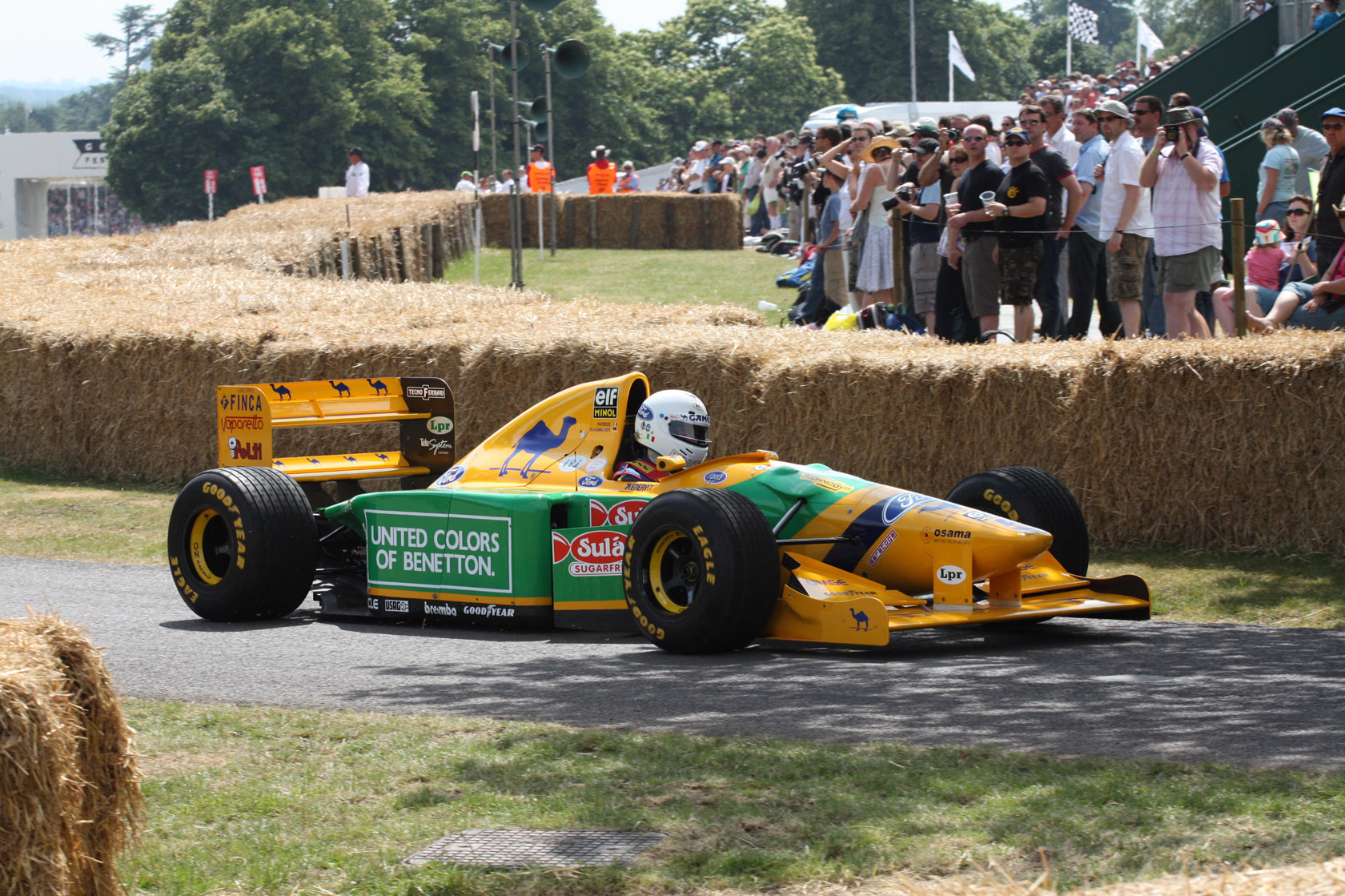
Beneton B193 at Goodwood Festival of Speed

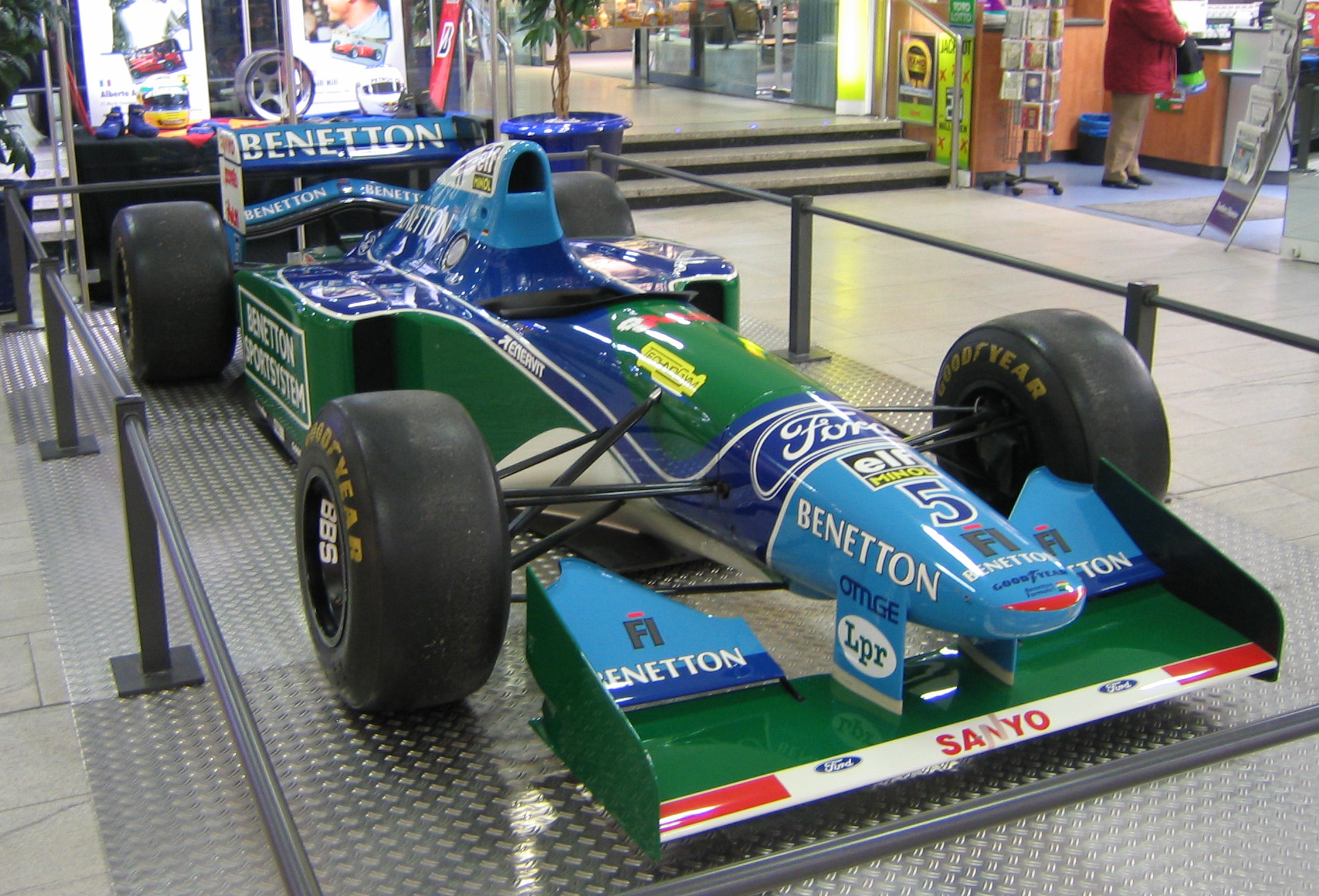
Benetton received sponsorship from Mild Seven until 2001 and produced the first two championship titles of Michael Schumacher, this is the Benetton B194 in display

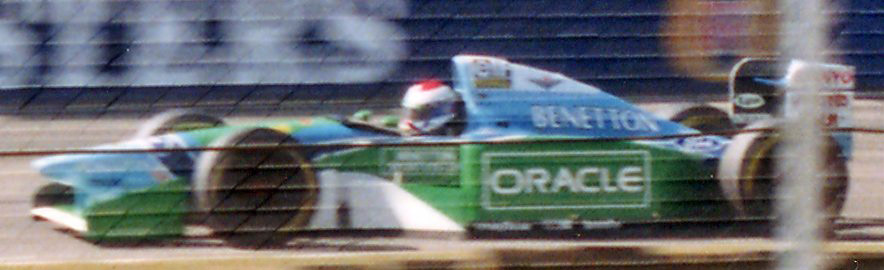
Jos Verstappen driving at the 1994 British GP

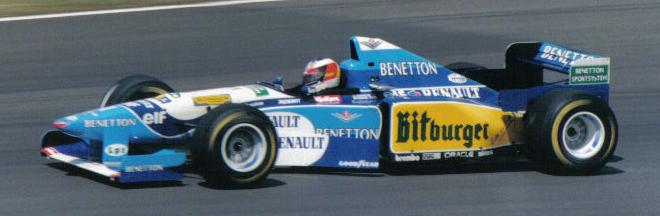
Michael Schumacher driving for Benetton at the 1995 British GP

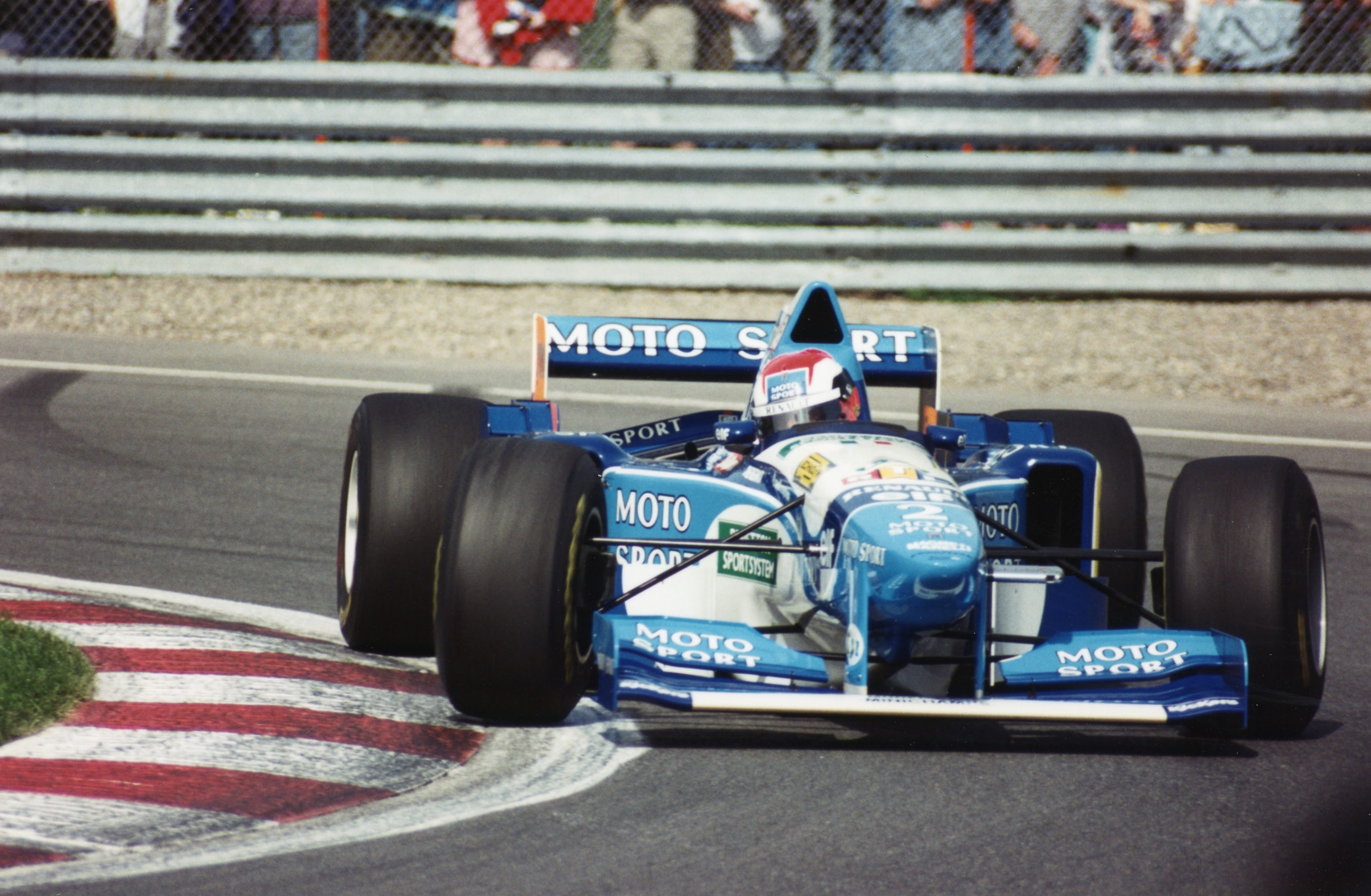
Johnny Herbert racing for Benetton (non-tobacco livery) at Montreal in 1995

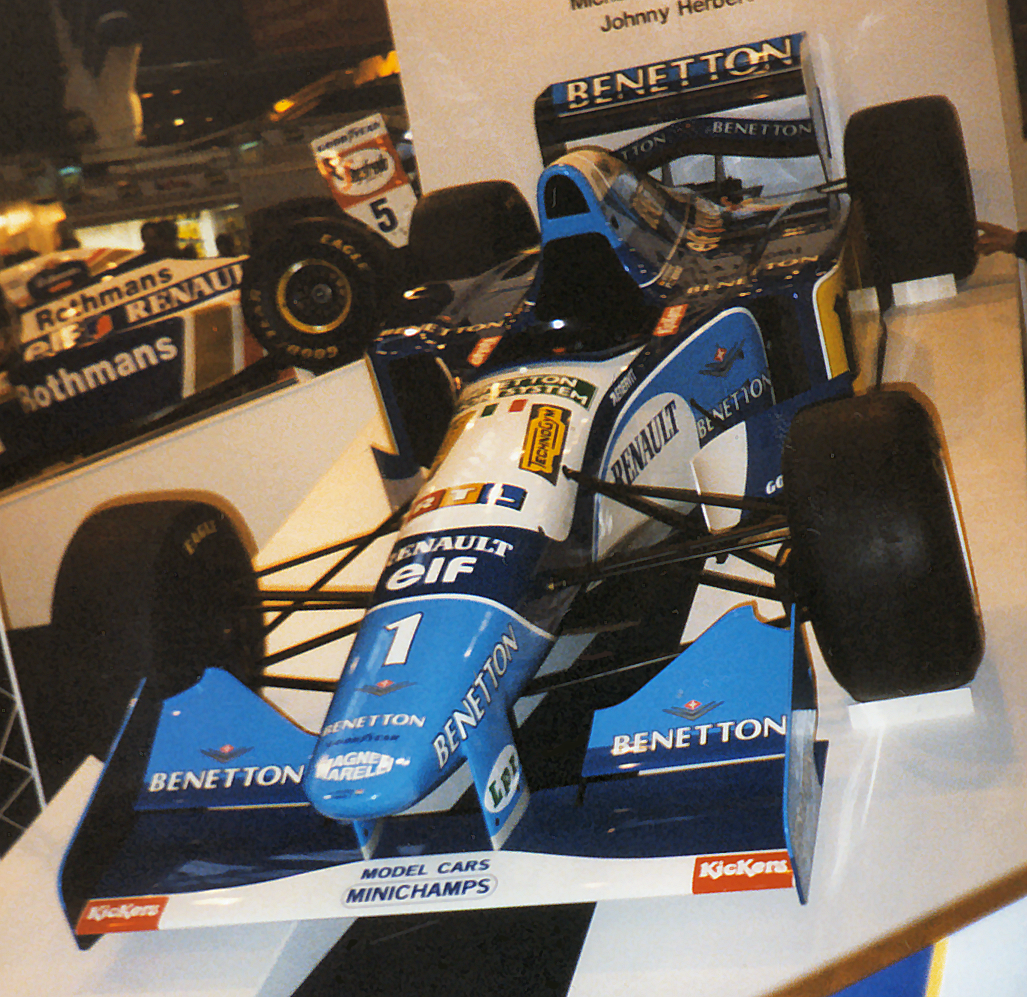
Michael Schumacher's Benetton B195 at the 1996 Autosport International Show

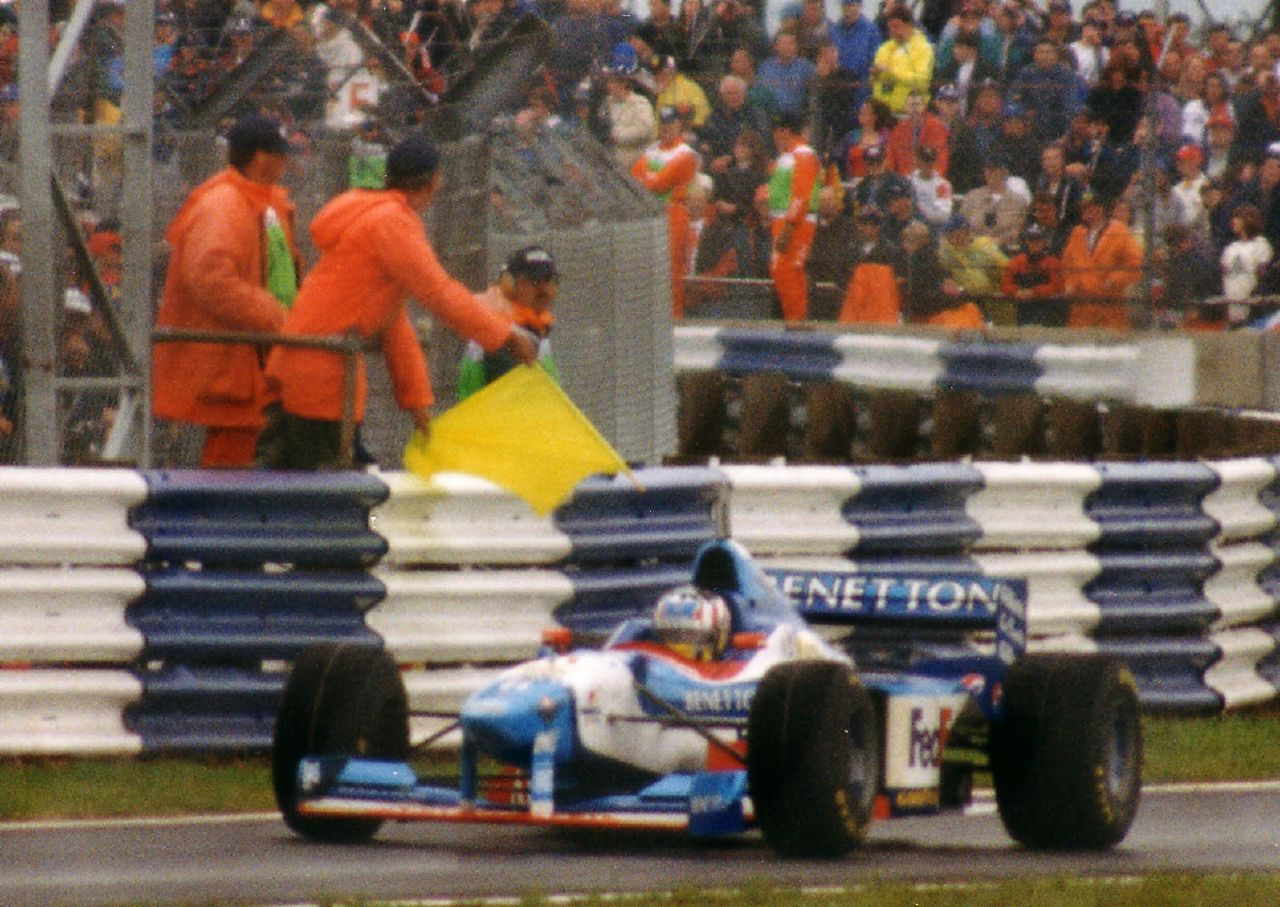
Alexander Wurz driving for Benetton at the 1997 British Grand Prix

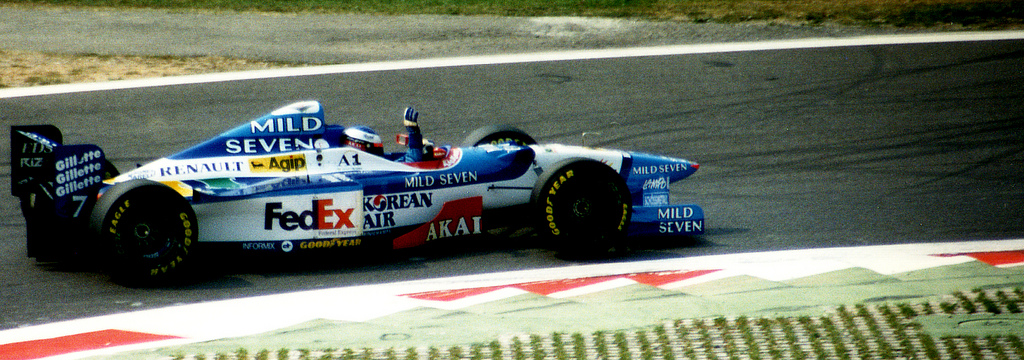
Jean Alesi driving a Benetton at the 1997 Italian Grand Prix

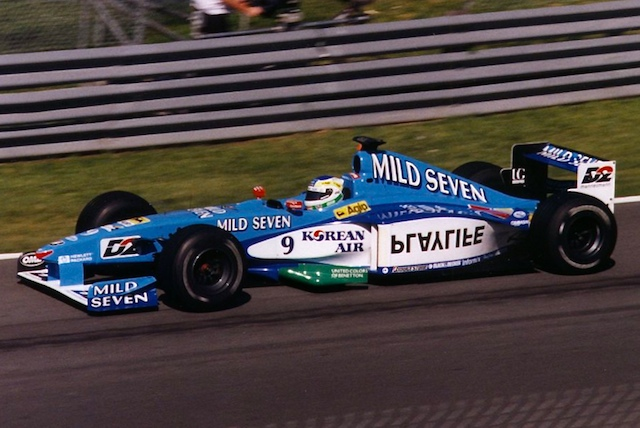
Giancarlo Fisichella driving for Benetton at Montreal in 1999

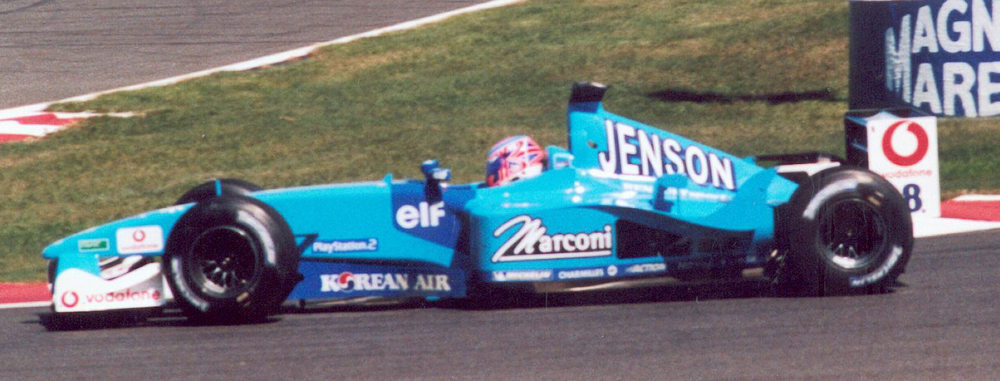
For its final years prior to the takeover of Renault, Benetton received sponsorship from Renault, Vodafone and Korean Air; this is Jenson Button driving in 2001 for Benetton

== BMS Scuderia Italia ==
In its Dallara years, Scuderia Italia raced with a livery slightly similar to Ferrari (rosso corsa with white details and black wings), but prior to the absorption by Minardi in 1993, when raced with Lola cars, had a white livery with red and yellow flames.

Year	Main colour(s)	Additional colour(s)	Main sponsor(s)	Additional major sponsor(s)	Non-tobacco/alcohol livery changes
1988 (Dallara 3081)	Red	Black	None	Goodyear	None
1988 (Dallara F188)	Red	Black, White	Marlboro	Viacom, Nikols, Timberland, Magneti Marelli, Weber, Berlucchi, Castrol, Brembo	None
1989	Red	Black, White	Marlboro, Lusfina, Fineco	Agip, Nikols, Pirelli, Magneti Marelli, Weber, Brembo, Lucchini, USAG, Koni	None
1990	Red	Black, White	Marlboro, Lucchini, Fineco	Agip, CartaSì, Pirelli, Brooksfield	None
1991	Red	Black, White	Marlboro, Lucchini, Fineco, Lusfina, Setrans	Agip, Ghial, OGAF, powering	None
1992	Red	Black, White, Blue	Marlboro, Lucchini, Fineco, Lusfina, Camozzi	Agip, Ghidini, SPAL	None
1993	White	Black, Red, Yellow, Blue	Chesterfield, Lucchini, Bossini, Camozzi	Agip, Fastar	None

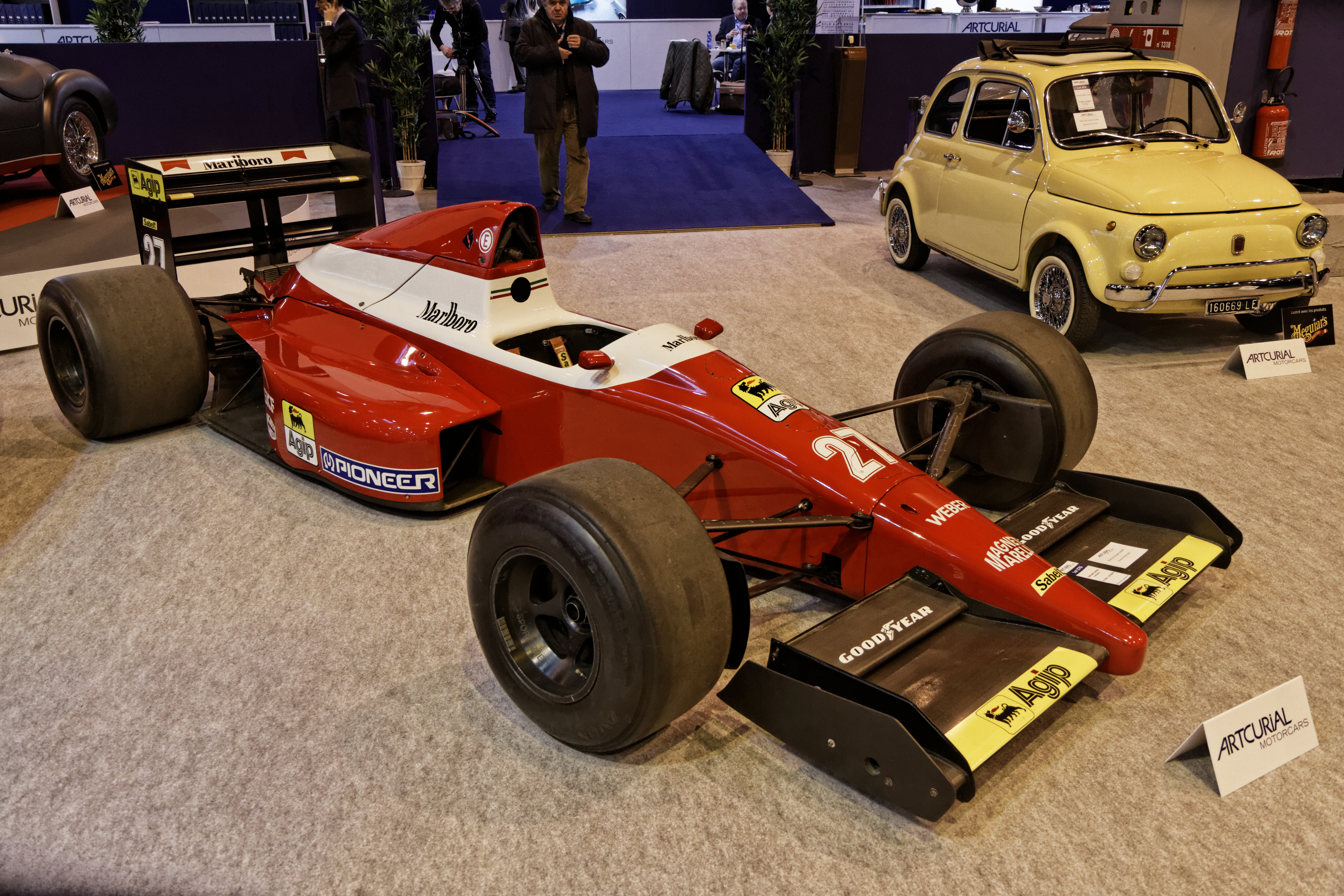
A Dallara F89 in display.

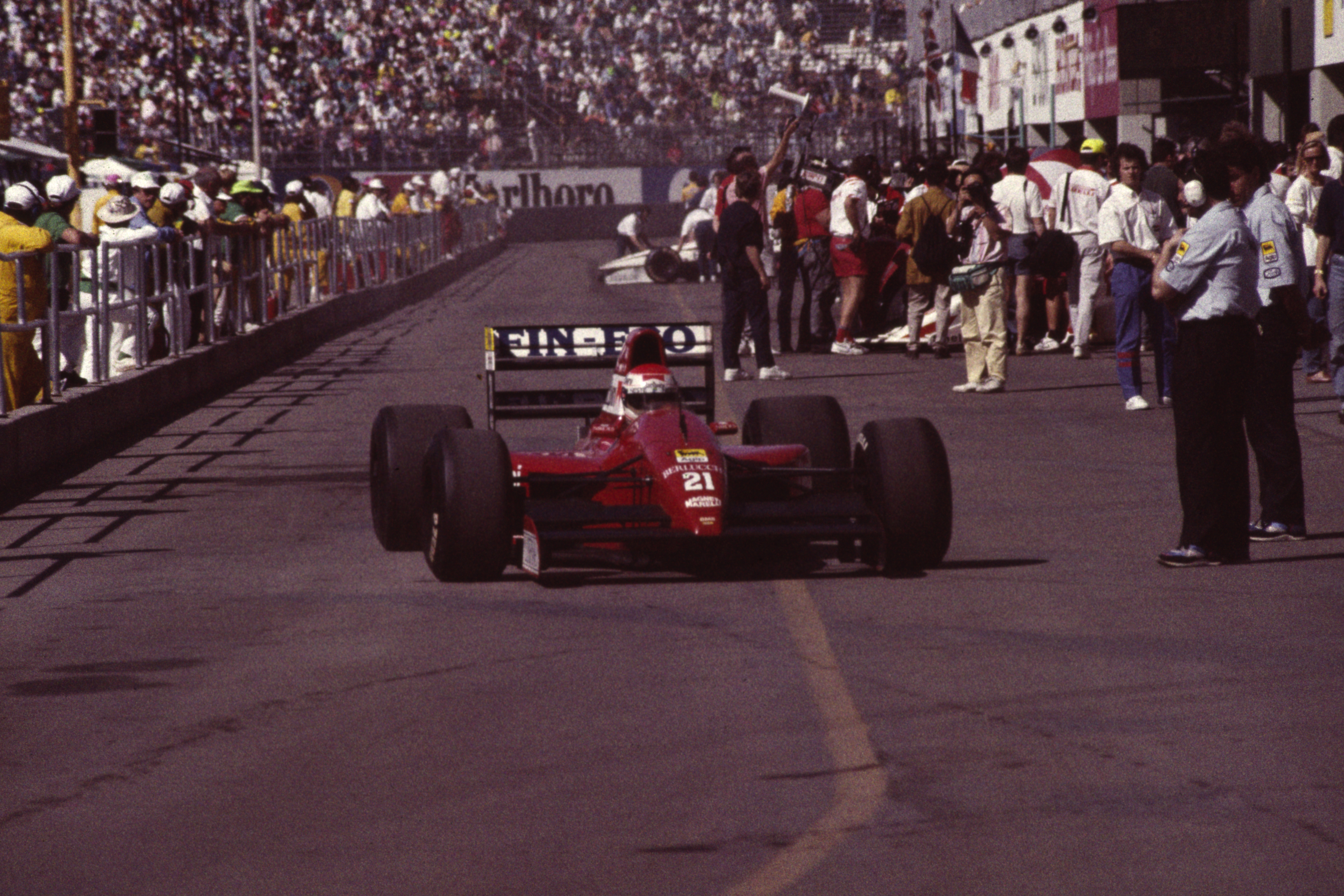
Emanuele Pirro driving for Scuderia Italia at the 1991 United States Grand Prix.

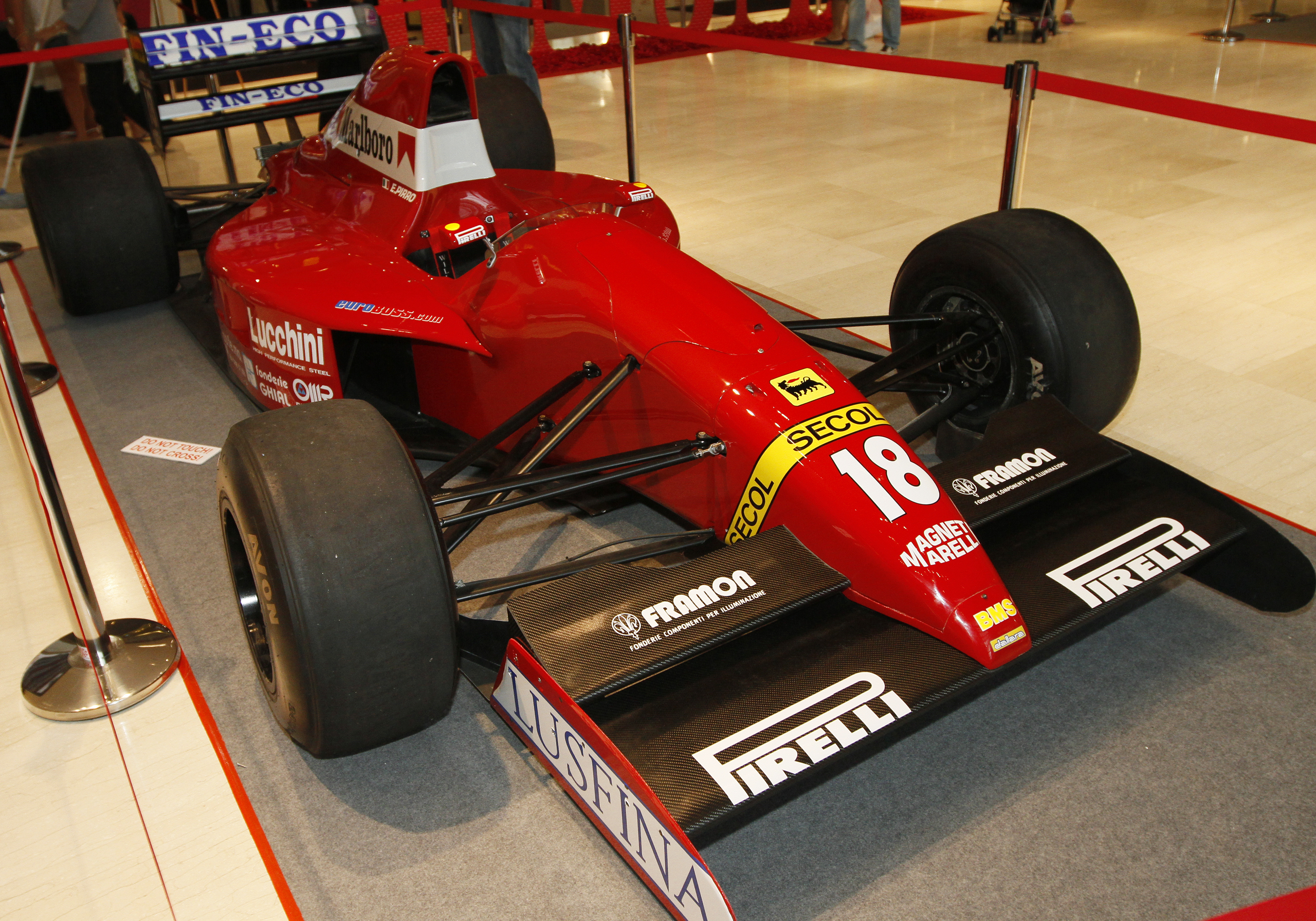
A Dallara F191 in display

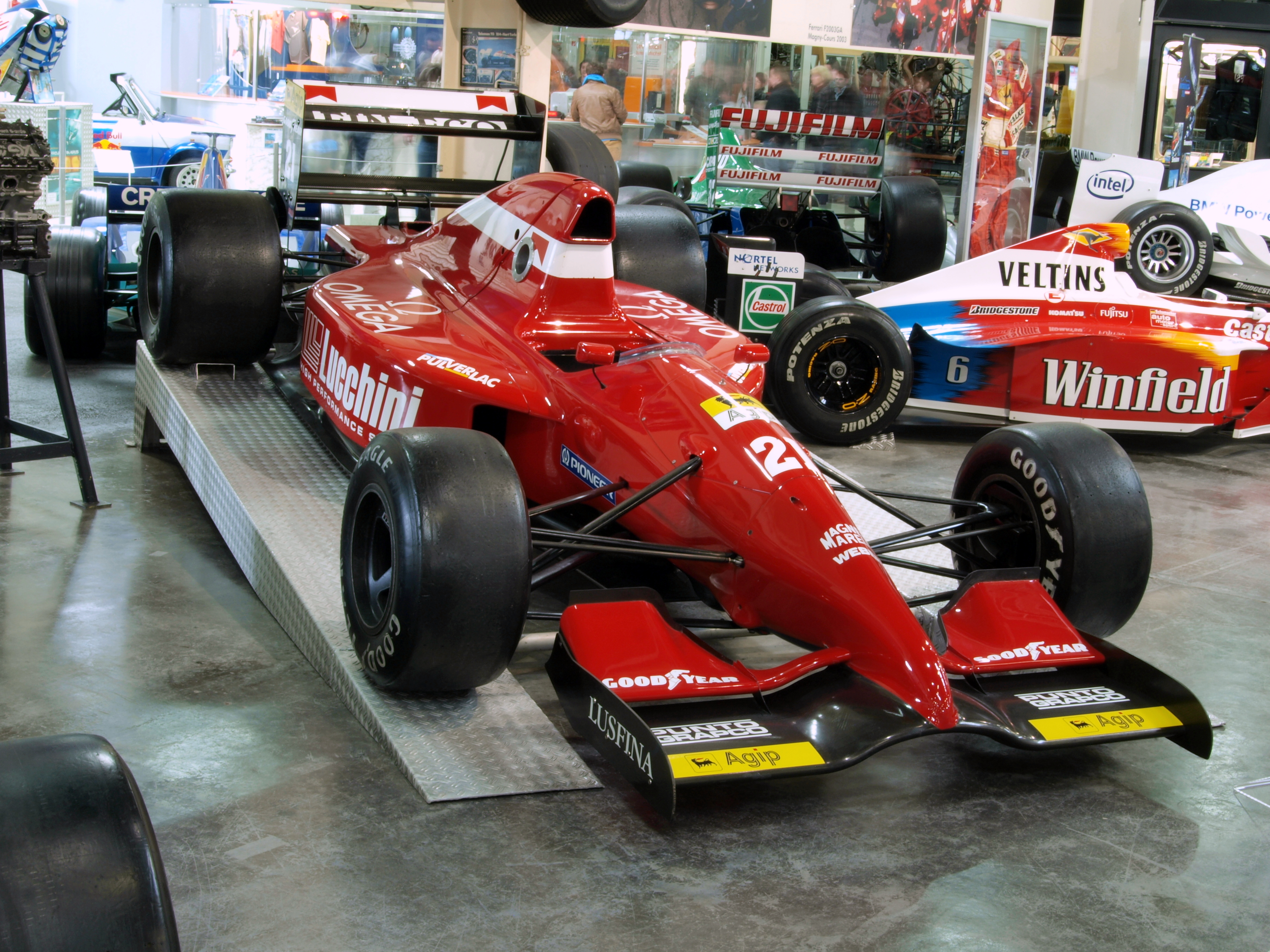
A Dallara F192 in display

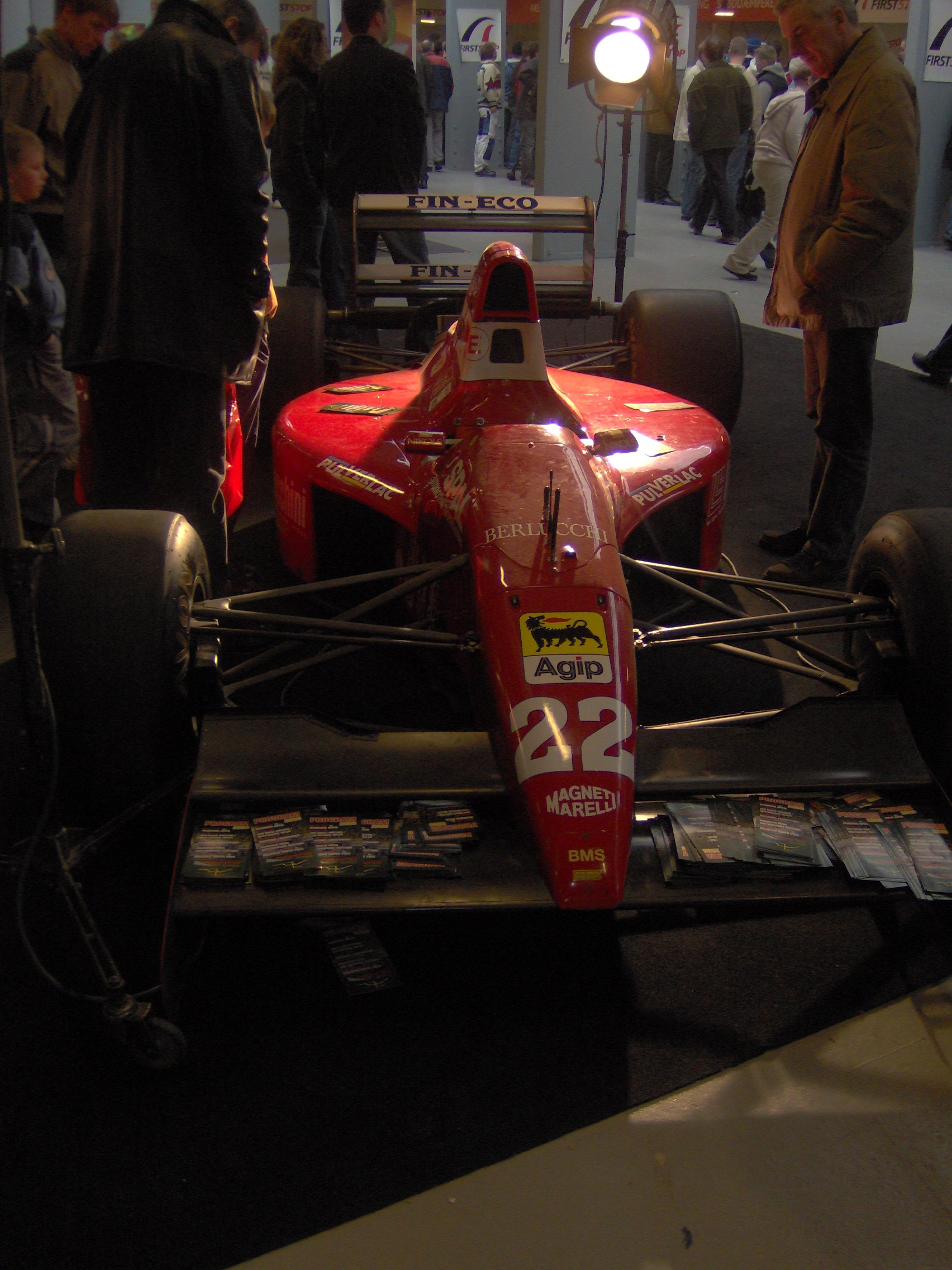
JJ Lehto's 1992 Dallara in the boxes

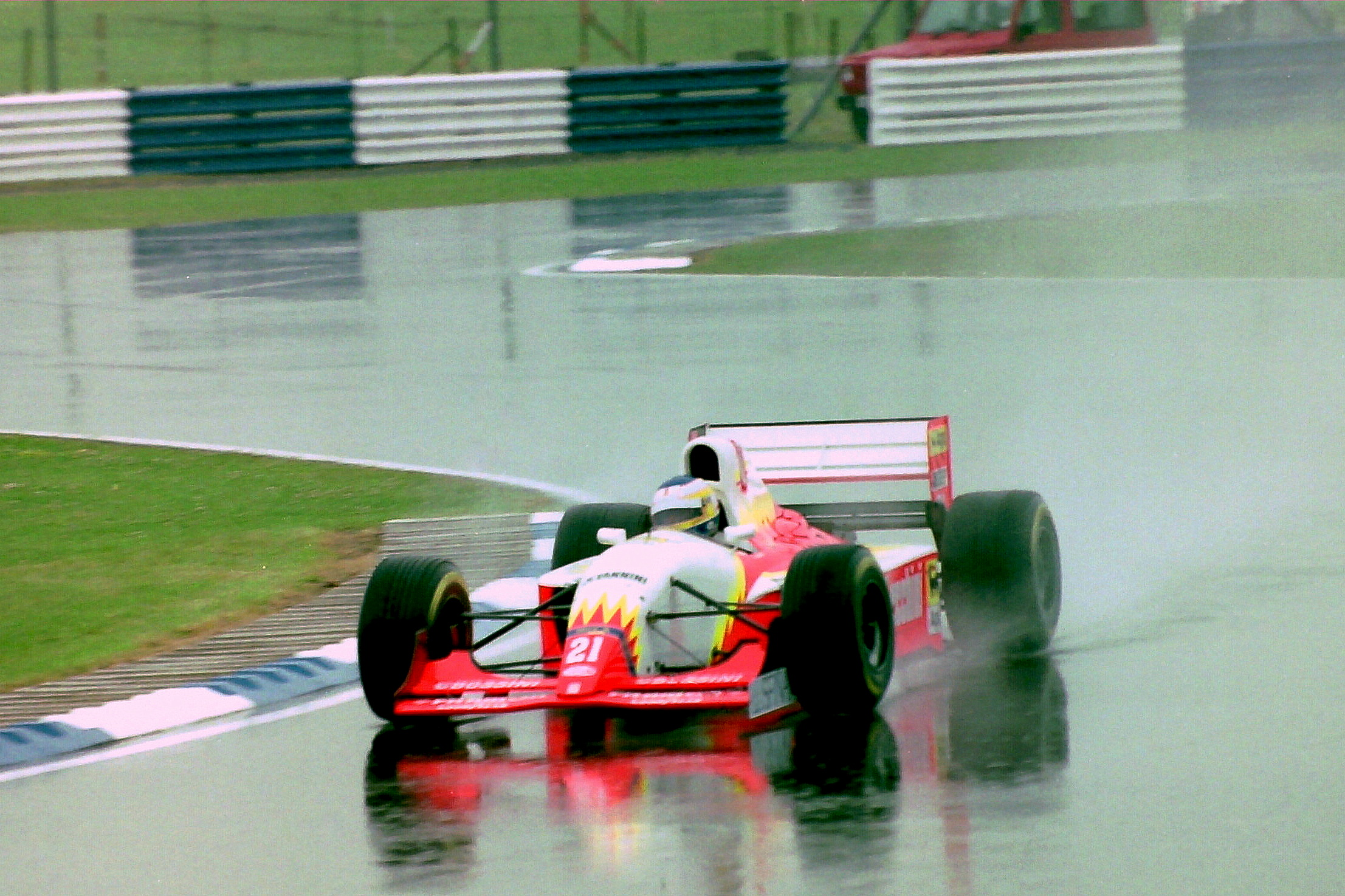
Michele Alboreto's T93/30 at the 1993 British Grand Prix

== BMW Sauber ==
After having been an engine supplier in the 1980s and again since 2000, BMW entered Formula One with a works team of its own in 2006 after buying Sauber. The livery was based on the traditional BMW Motorsport team colours of white with light blue, dark blue and a little red (in an almost purple shade). White is also the original national racing colour of Germany, while white and blue are the colours of Bavaria and of BMW itself. On 27 November 2009, BMW agreed to sell the team back to its original founder, Peter Sauber.

Year	Main colour(s)	Additional colour(s)	Main sponsor(s)	Additional major sponsor(s)
2006–2009	White	Blue, Red	Petronas, Intel, T-Systems (2008)	Syntium, Hansen LTD (2006–2008), Go-gp.org (2009), FxPro (2009), Credit Suisse (2006–2008), Dell (2006–2008)

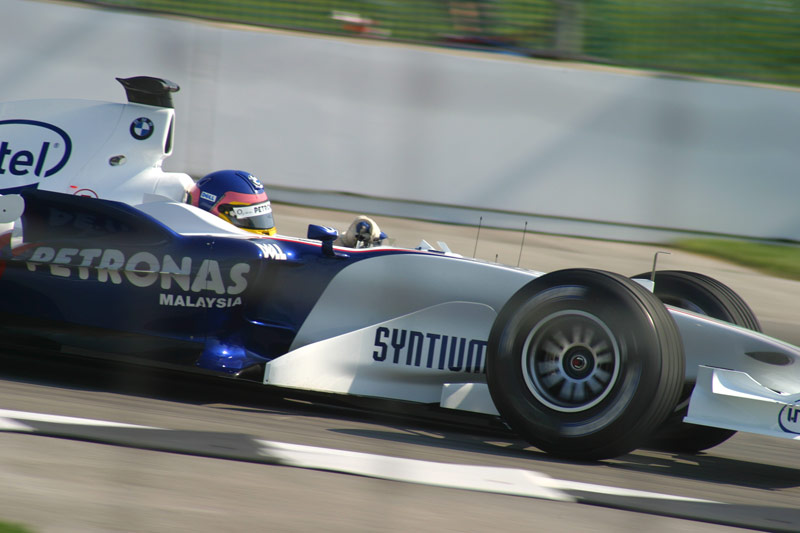
Jacques Villeneuve driving the BMW Sauber F1.06 at the 2006 USGP.

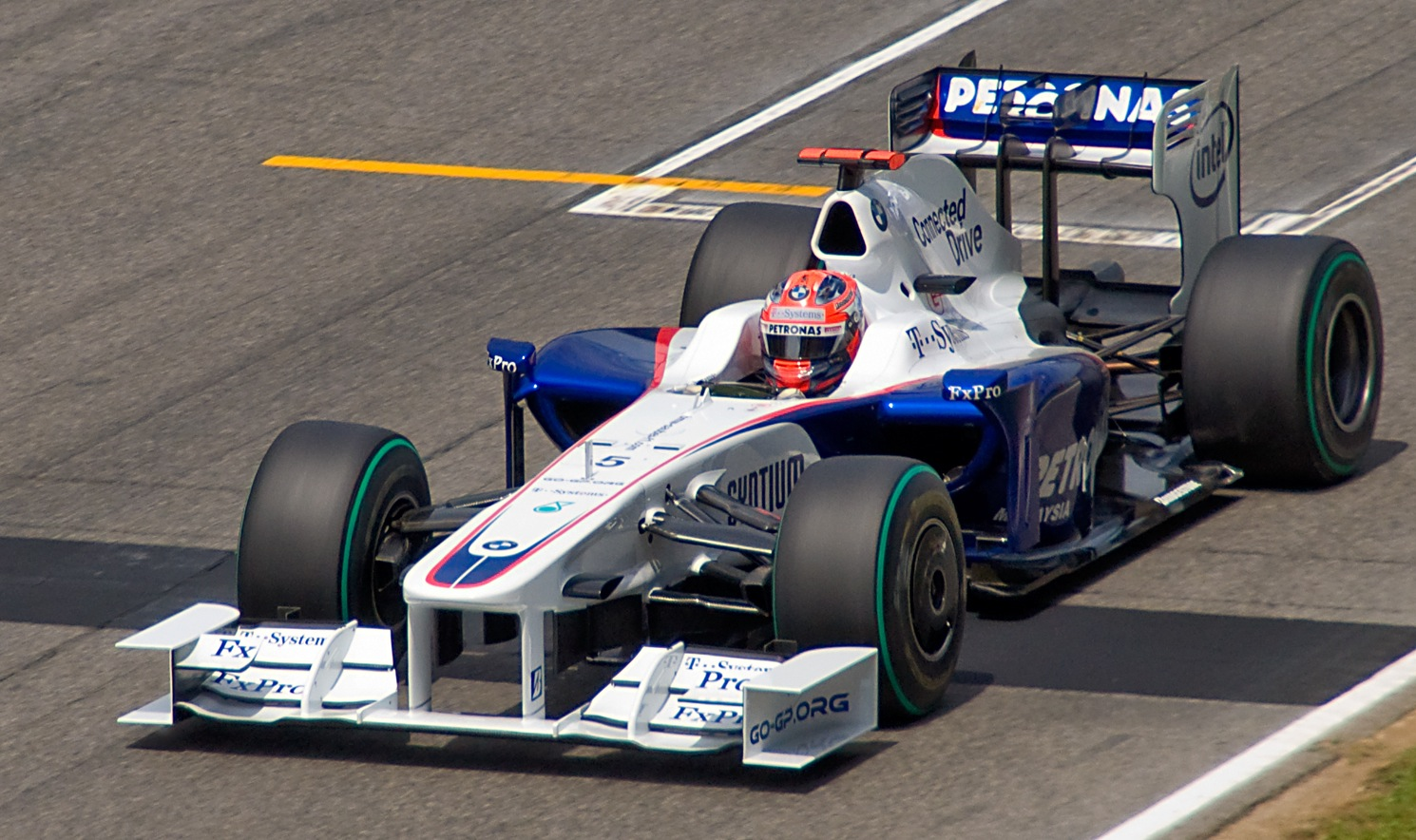
Robert Kubica driving the BMW Sauber F1.09 at the 2009 Australian GP.

== Brabham ==
Prior to sponsorships, Brabham raced in turquoise with a gold band running across the car. This later changed to green and gold, the racing colours of Australia, as a mark of the nationality of the team's owner Jack Brabham. A Brabham car was the first Formula One car painted in the livery of a team's sponsor when Team Gunston as a privateer team entered a private Brabham car at the first race of the 1968 season (the 1968 South African Grand Prix). In 1975 and 1976, Brabham received sponsorship from Martini; in 1976 the color scheme changed from white to red with light blue trim. The primary sponsor changed to Parmalat in 1978, with the cars retaining a variant of the same red and blue colors. With the team's switch to BMW engines in 1982, the new livery consisted of a clean dark blue and white with a stylized BMW "kidney grille" on the nose. This scheme was retained throughout the BMW years, even through a sponsorship change to Olivetti in 1985, until 1989. (This unusual representation of the engine supplier, specifically BMW, in the color scheme was revived by Williams when they debuted their own BMW cars in 2000.) In 1989, Brabham signed with Bioptron, a brand of Zepter International, which continued until the team was bought by Middlebridge Group. Since then, it was sponsored by many Japanese companies like Garage Italiya, a company that imports Italian cars in Japan, Autobacs, Nippon Shinpan, and Mitsukoshi. In its final season Brabham raced in blue and pink livery of the Japanese metal group Seikima-II.

Year	Driver(s)	Main colour(s)	Additional colour(s)	Main sponsor(s)	Additional major sponsor(s)
1971	Graham Hill	Green	Yellow	Esso	Goodyear
1971	Tim Schenken	Green	Yellow	Esso	Goodyear
1971	Chris Craft	Green	Orange	Bick's	STP, Gulf
1971	Dave Charlton	White and Red		Lucky Strike	Esso
1972	Graham Hill	White		Esso Uniflo	Ford, Goodyear
1972	Carlos Reutemann	White		YPF	1978 FIFA World Cup, CAP Argentine Meat, Ford, Goodyear
1972	Wilson Fittipaldi	White		Bardahl	Ford, Goodyear, Varga
1973	Carlos Reutemann	White		YPF	CAP Argentine Meat, Ceramica Pagnossin, Goodyear
1973	Wilson Fittipaldi	White		Promax Bardahl	Brasil Export 73 Trade Fair, Cacique
1973	Andrea de Adamich	White		Ceramica Pagnossin	Goodyear
1973	Rolf Stommelen	White		Ceramica Pagnossin	Goodyear
1973	John Watson	White		Ceramica Pagnossin	Goodyear
1973	John Watson	Black		Hexagon of Highgate	Goodyear
1974	Teddy Pilette	White		Hitachi (Belgian Grand Prix)	Goodyear
1974	Carlos Reutemann	White		Hitachi (Belgian Grand Prix)	Goodyear
1974	Carlos Reutemann	White		Texaco (South African Grand Prix only)	Goodyear
1974	Richard Robarts	White			Goodyear
1974	Rikky von Opel	White			Goodyear
1974	Carlos Pace	White			Goodyear
1975	Carlos Reutemann	White		Martini & Rossi	Goodyear
1975	Carlos Pace	White		Martini & Rossi	Goodyear
1976	Carlos Reutemann	Red		Martini & Rossi	Alfa Romeo, Goodyear
1976	Carlos Pace	Red		Martini & Rossi	Alfa Romeo, Goodyear
1976	Rolf Stommelen	Red		Martini & Rossi	Alfa Romeo, Goodyear
1976	Larry Perkins	Red		Martini & Rossi	Alfa Romeo, Goodyear
1977	John Watson	Red		Martini & Rossi	Alfa Romeo, Goodyear
1977	Carlos Pace	Red		Martini & Rossi	Alfa Romeo, Goodyear
1977	Hans-Joachim Stuck	Red		Martini & Rossi	Alfa Romeo, Goodyear
1977	Giorgio Francia	Red		Martini & Rossi	Alfa Romeo, Goodyear
1978	Niki Lauda	Red		Parmalat	Alfa Romeo, Goodyear
1978	John Watson	Red		Parmalat	Alfa Romeo, Goodyear
1978	Nelson Piquet	Red		Parmalat	Alfa Romeo, Goodyear
1979	Niki Lauda	Red		Parmalat	Alfa Romeo, Goodyear
1979	Ricardo Zunino	Red		Parmalat	Alfa Romeo, Goodyear
1979	Nelson Piquet	Red		Parmalat	Alfa Romeo, Goodyear
1980	Nelson Piquet	White	Dark Blue	Parmalat	Goodyear
1980	Ricardo Zunino	White	Dark Blue	Parmalat	Goodyear
1980	Héctor Rebaque	White	Dark Blue	Parmalat	Goodyear
1981	Nelson Piquet	White	Dark Blue	Parmalat	Goodyear, Pemex
1981	Héctor Rebaque	White	Dark Blue	Parmalat	Goodyear, Pemex
1982	Nelson Piquet	White	Dark Blue	Parmalat	BMW M Power, Michelin, Santal, Valvoline
1982	Riccardo Patrese	White	Dark Blue	Parmalat	BMW M Power, Michelin, Santal, Valvoline
1983	Nelson Piquet	White	Dark Blue	Parmalat	BMW M Power, Castrol, Fila, Michelin, Santal
1983	Riccardo Patrese	White	Dark Blue	Parmalat	BMW M Power, Castrol, Fila, Michelin, Santal
1984	Nelson Piquet	Dark Blue	White	Parmalat	BMW M Power, Castrol, Michelin, Santal
1984	Teo Fabi	Dark Blue	White	Parmalat	BMW M Power, Castrol, Michelin, Santal
1984	Corrado Fabi	Dark Blue	White	Parmalat	BMW M Power, Castrol, Michelin, Santal
1984	Manfred Winkelhock	Dark Blue	White	Parmalat	BMW M Power, Castrol, Michelin, Santal
1985	Nelson Piquet	Dark Blue	White	Olivetti	BMW M Power, Pirelli
1985	François Hesnault	Dark Blue	White	Olivetti	BMW M Power, Pirelli
1985	Marc Surer	Dark Blue	White	Olivetti	BMW M Power, Pirelli
1986	Riccardo Patrese	Dark Blue	White	Olivetti	BMW M Power, Emporio Armani, Pirelli
1986	Elio de Angelis	Dark Blue	White	Olivetti	BMW M Power, Emporio Armani, Pirelli
1986	Derek Warwick	Dark Blue	White	Olivetti	BMW M Power, Emporio Armani, Pirelli
1987	Riccardo Patrese	Dark Blue	White	Olivetti (Italian Grand Prix onwards)	BMW M Power, Iceberg, Minolta, Olivetti, Ricard, Tissot
1987	Stefano Modena	Dark Blue	White	Olivetti (Italian Grand Prix onwards)	BMW M Power, Iceberg, Minolta, Olivetti, Ricard, Tissot
1987	Andrea de Cesaris	Dark Blue	White	Olivetti (Italian Grand Prix onwards)	BMW M Power, Iceberg, Minolta, Olivetti, Ricard, Tissot
1989	Martin Brundle	White	Blue	Bioptron	Amigo, Nippon Shinpan, Pirelli
1989	Stefano Modena	White	Blue	Bioptron	Amigo, Nippon Shinpan, Pirelli
1990	Gregor Foitek	White Dark Blue	Dark Blue White	Garage Italiya (伊太利屋) (Monaco Grand Prix onwards)	AOBA, Calbee (カルビー), Carvico, Eurojersey SpA, Pirelli
1990	David Brabham	White Dark Blue	Dark Blue White	Garage Italiya (伊太利屋) (Monaco Grand Prix onwards)	AOBA, Calbee (カルビー), Carvico, Eurojersey SpA, Pirelli
1990	Stefano Modena	White Dark Blue	Dark Blue White	Garage Italiya (伊太利屋) (Monaco Grand Prix onwards)	AOBA, Calbee (カルビー), Carvico, Eurojersey SpA, Pirelli
1991	Martin Brundle	Dark Blue	Red or White	Mitsukoshi, Yamaha Motor Company, Yamazen	AOBA, Autobacs, Bosch, BP, Carvico, Eurojersey SpA, I.M.I. Bergamo, Kyosho, Madras, Mitsui, NGK Sparkplugs, Pirelli, Qantas, Speedbox International, Sumitomo Marine, Toshio Kamiyama Styling-office
1991	Mark Blundell	Dark Blue	Red or White	Mitsukoshi, Yamaha Motor Company, Yamazen	AOBA, Autobacs, Bosch, BP, Carvico, Eurojersey SpA, I.M.I. Bergamo, Kyosho, Madras, Mitsui, NGK Sparkplugs, Pirelli, Qantas, Speedbox International, Sumitomo Marine, Toshio Kamiyama Styling-office
1992	Eric van de Poele; Giovanna Amati; Damon Hill	Dark Blue	White	Yamazen	BMS Group, BP, Cricket & Co, Galley Matrix, IMEC, Lagostina, LeasePlan, Yaesu
1992	Eric van de Poele; Giovanna Amati; Damon Hill	Pink, Dark Blue and Light Blue		Seikima-II	BMS Group, BP, Cricket & Co, Galley Matrix, IMEC, Lagostina, LeasePlan, Yaesu

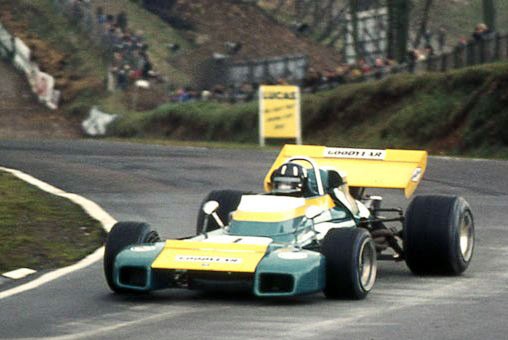
Graham Hill driving the BT34, a car used from 1971-1972.

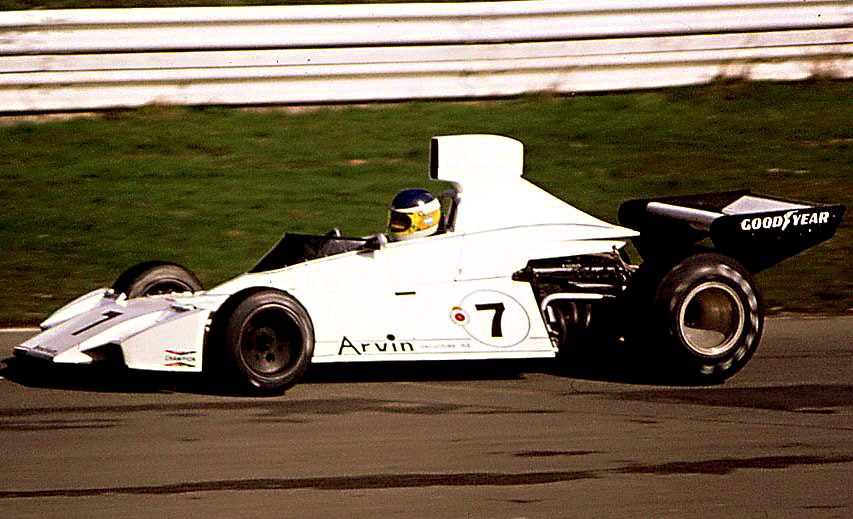
Carlos Reutemann driving the all-white BT44, a car used from 1974-1976.

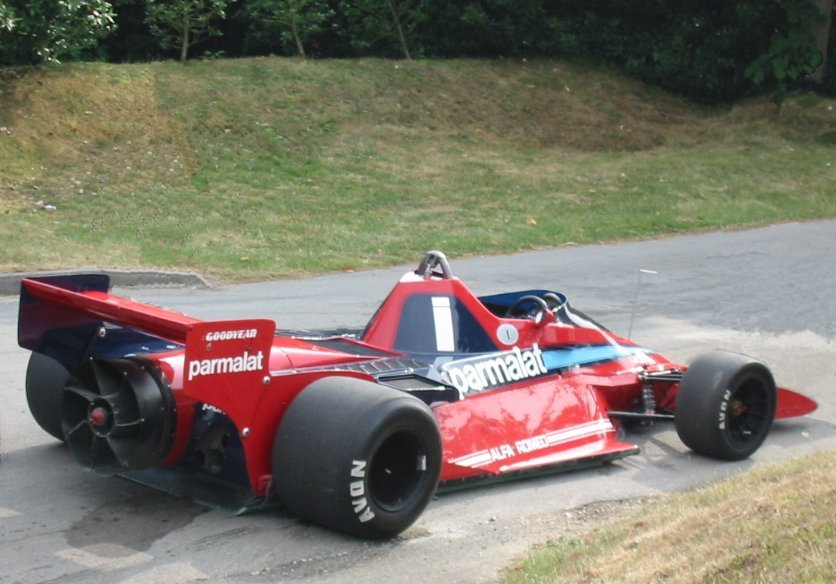
The BT46B "fan car", with main sponsor Parmalat.

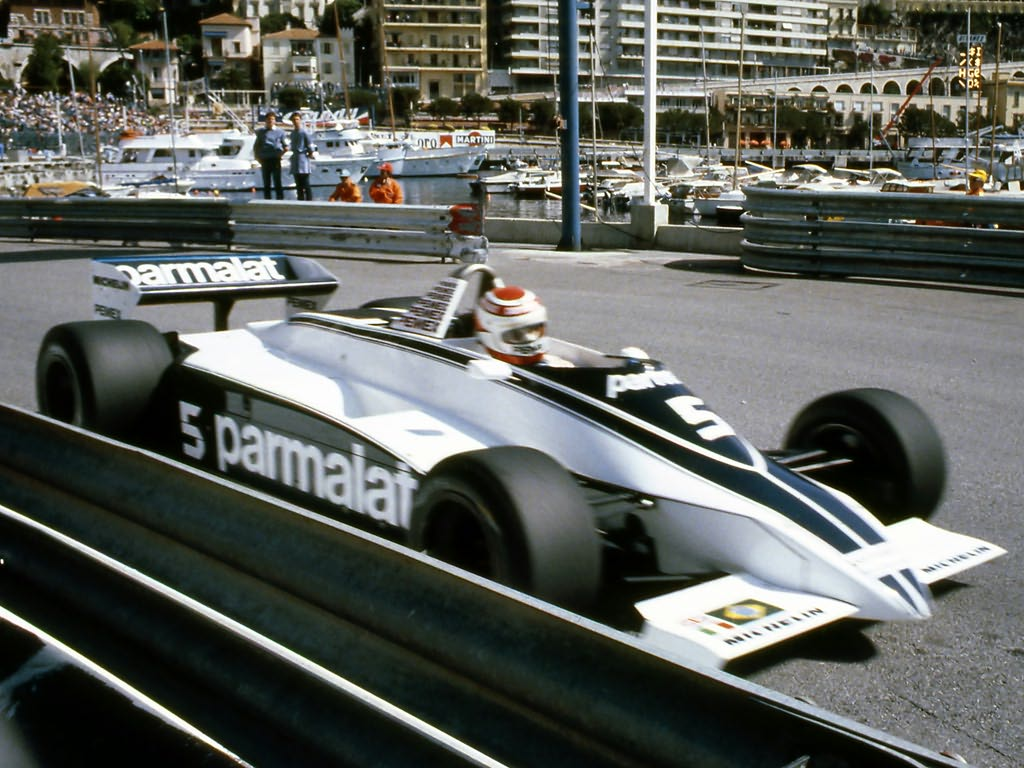
Nelson Piquet's BT49C in Parmalat livery at Monaco in 1981.

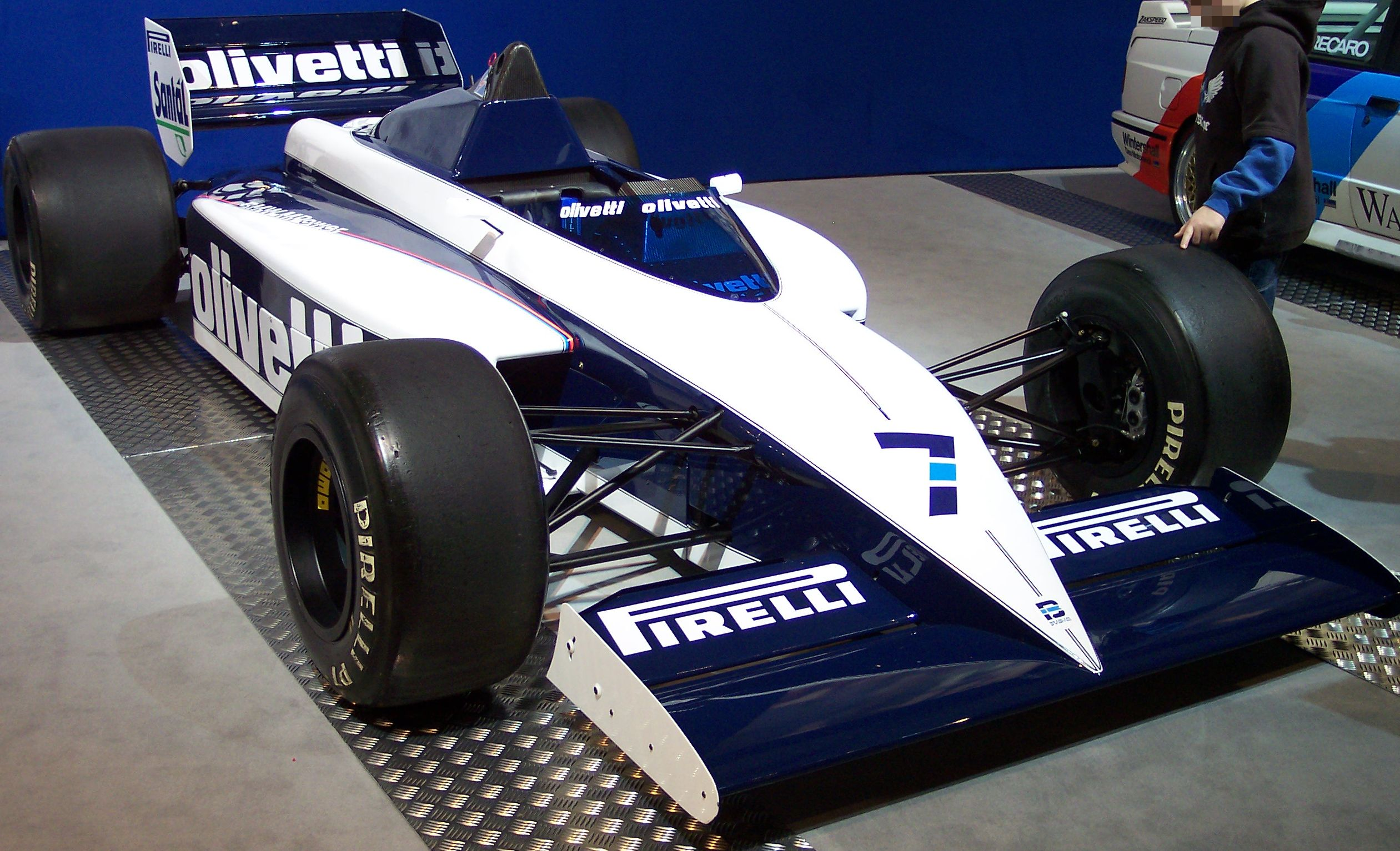
From 1985 until 1988, Brabham raced in Olivetti livery

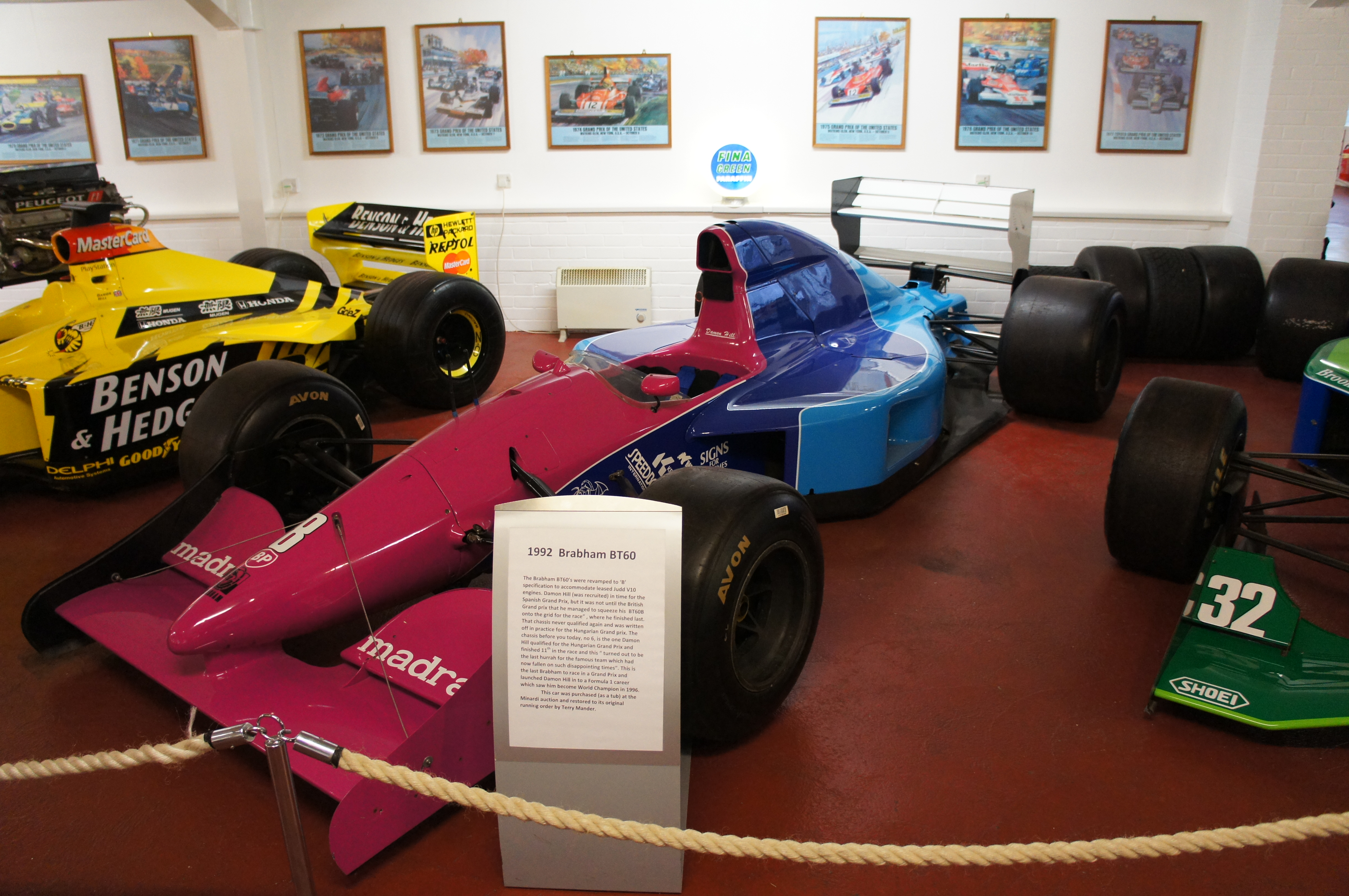
The Brabham BT60B in its blue and pink livery.

== Brawn GP ==
After Honda pulled out of F1 at the end of 2008, team boss Ross Brawn struggled to find a buyer to save the team, eventually buying it himself. A lack of sponsors resulted in the white livery, with flashes of bright yellow and black. Towards the end of the season, the team arranged one-race sponsor deals with a variety of major local companies, including Canon, Mapfre, Itaipava and Qtel.

Brawn GP dominated the early part of the 2009 season, with Jenson Button winning six of the first seven races. As other teams improved their cars, Brawn struggled for pace, but still recorded several podiums during the rest of the year. Their strong start and consistent finish was enough to secure the Constructors World Championship at the first (and only) attempt, as well as the drivers title with Jenson Button. At the end of the season, the team was purchased by engine supplier Mercedes-Benz.

Year	Main colour(s)	Additional colour(s)	Main sponsor(s)	Additional major sponsor(s)	Special liveries
2009	White	Black, Fluorescent Yellow	Virgin	Canon, MIG Investments, Henri Lloyd, Mapfre, Itaipava, Qtel, Banco do Brasil, TNT Energy Drink	The team supported movies Terminator Salvation at the 2009 Spanish Grand Prix respectively.

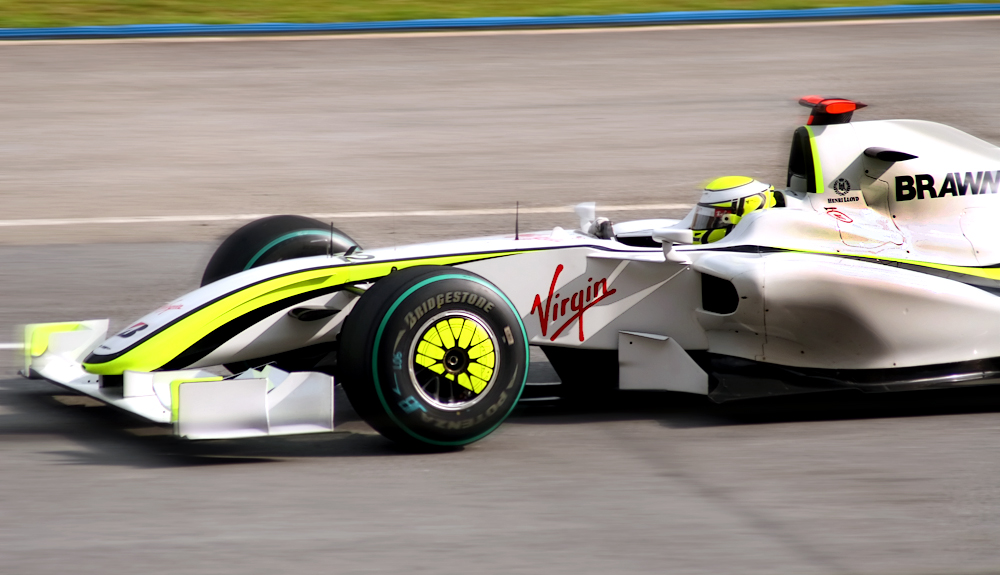
Jenson Button at 2009 Malaysian Grand Prix, Sepang, Malaysia

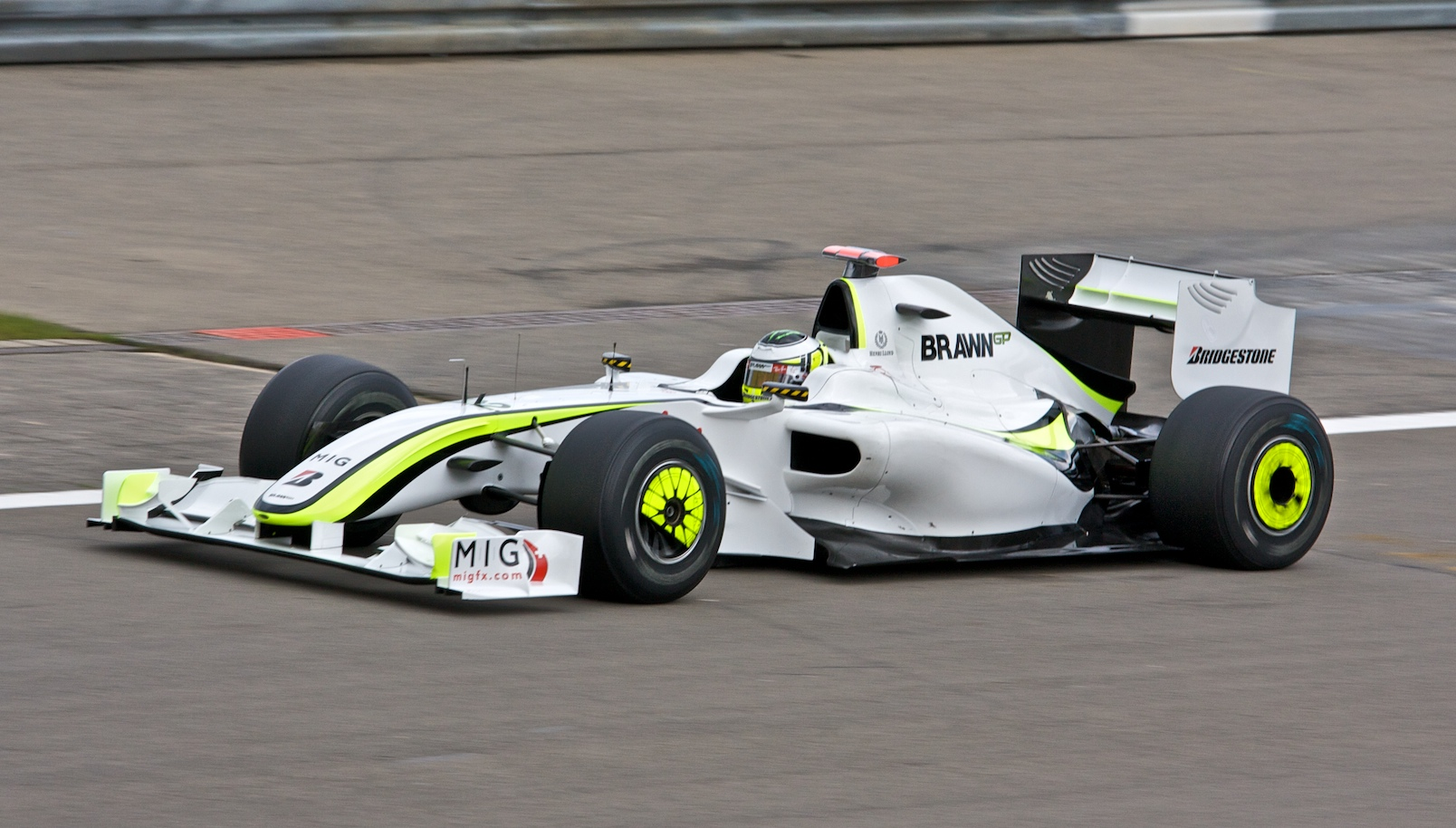
Jenson Button driving the Brawn BGP 001 at the 2009 German Grand Prix.

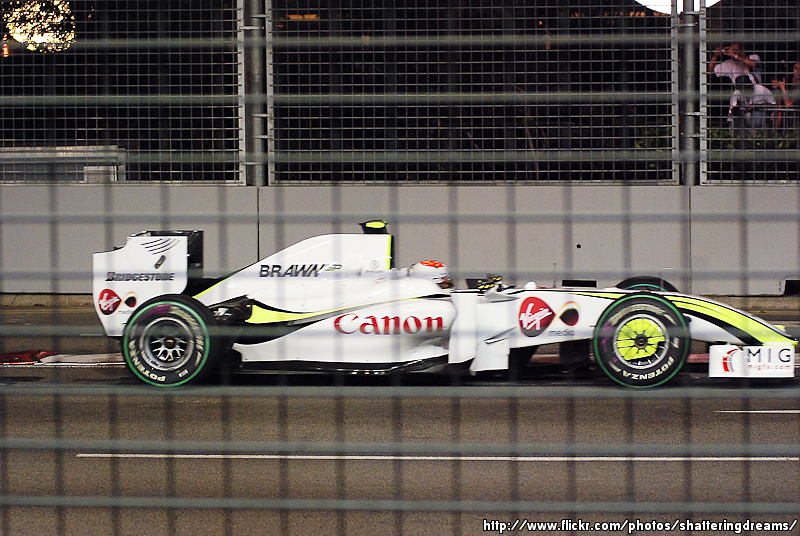
Rubens Barrichello driving for Brawn GP at the 2009 Singapore Grand Prix.

== British American Racing ==
British American Racing competed in Formula One from 1999 to 2005. The name was a reference to the team owner, British American Tobacco, hence the livery which included two of its main cigarette brands. In their debut season, the team wished to have its two cars painted in different liveries (one 555, the other Lucky Strike), but this was forbidden by the rules. So the team decided on a unique two-sided design, with the blue 555 livery of the right side of the car, and the red and white Luckies livery on the left and a zipper design on the middle. .

Year	Main colour(s)	Additional colour(s)	Livery sponsor(s)	Additional major sponsor(s)	Non-tobacco/alcohol livery changes
1999	Blue, Red	Black, White	Lucky Strike, 555	Teleglobe, Honda, Reynard, Bridgestone, Excel	555 logo changed to three crescent moons (same as in Subaru Impreza with 555 sponsorship); Lucky Strike logo blocked out (side of car) and replaced by "Run Free" (other parts of the car)
2000– 2005	White	Red, Black	Lucky Strike (British American Tobacco)	Honda, Intercond, Tiscali, 555, Sonax, Reynard, Teleglobe, bee-trade.com, Acer, Brunotti, Sema Group (2000), Sina (2003), Mac Tools (2004), Ray-Ban (2004–2005), Alpinestars (2004–2005), Showa (2004–2005), ENEOS (2005), NGK (2005), NTN (2005), Celerant (2005)	Lucky Strike logo either blocked out (2000–2001), "Luckies" changed to "Lookies" (2000), "Lucky Strike" was replaced with "Look Alike" (2001), "Run Free" (2002), bar code and Formula One cars (2003–2004), "Don't Walk", "Look Left" and "Look Right" and a barcode and Formula One cars (2004) or with "Racing Revolution" (2005)
2004–2005 (only Chinese GP)	White	Blue, Pale Gold, Black	555 (British American Tobacco)	Honda, Intercond, Mac Tools (2004), Ray-Ban (2004–2005), Alpinestars (2004–2005), Showa (2004–2005), ENEOS (2005), NGK (2005), NTN (2005)	"Lucky Strike" was replaced with "555 World Racing"
2004–2005 (Anthony Davidson's car)	Blue / White	Yellow, White/ Black, Gold, White driver outline	555 (British American Tobacco)/Lucky Strike	Honda, Intercond, Mac Tools (2004), Ray-Ban (2004–2005), Alpinestars (2004–2005), Showa (2004–2005), ENEOS (2005), NGK (2005), NTN (2005)	"Lucky Strike" was replaced with "555 World Racing"

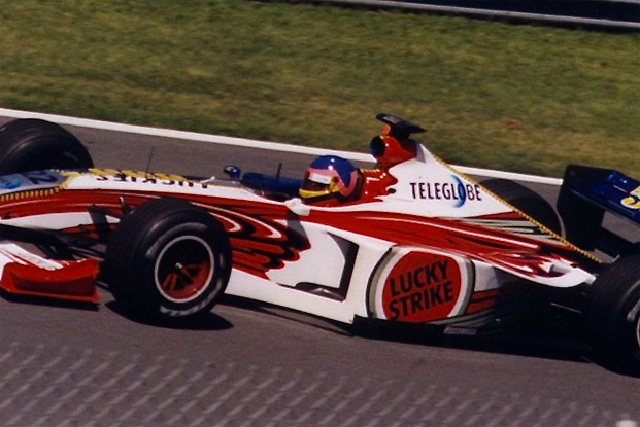
Jacques Villeneuve with Blue-Yellow/White-Red livery at the 1999 Canadian Grand Prix.

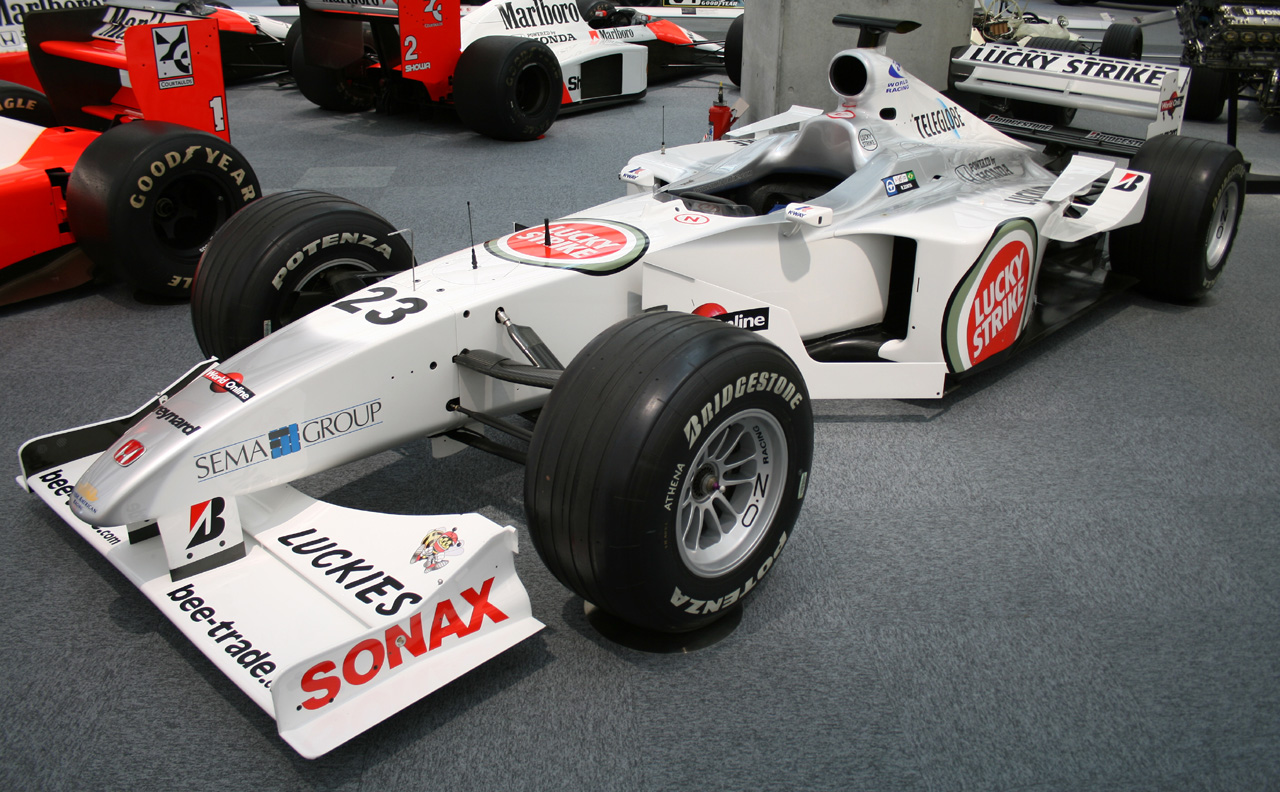
A Bar 002 in the 2000 season livery

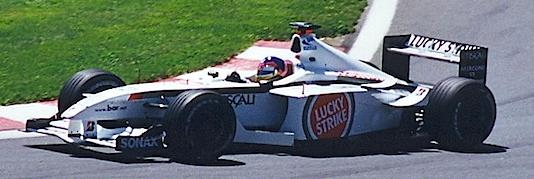
Jacques Villeneuve driving the BAR 003 at the 2001 Canadian Grand Prix.

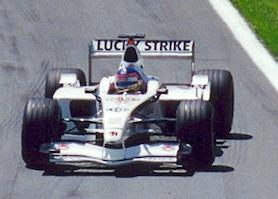
Jacques Villeneuve driving the BAR 003 in the same race

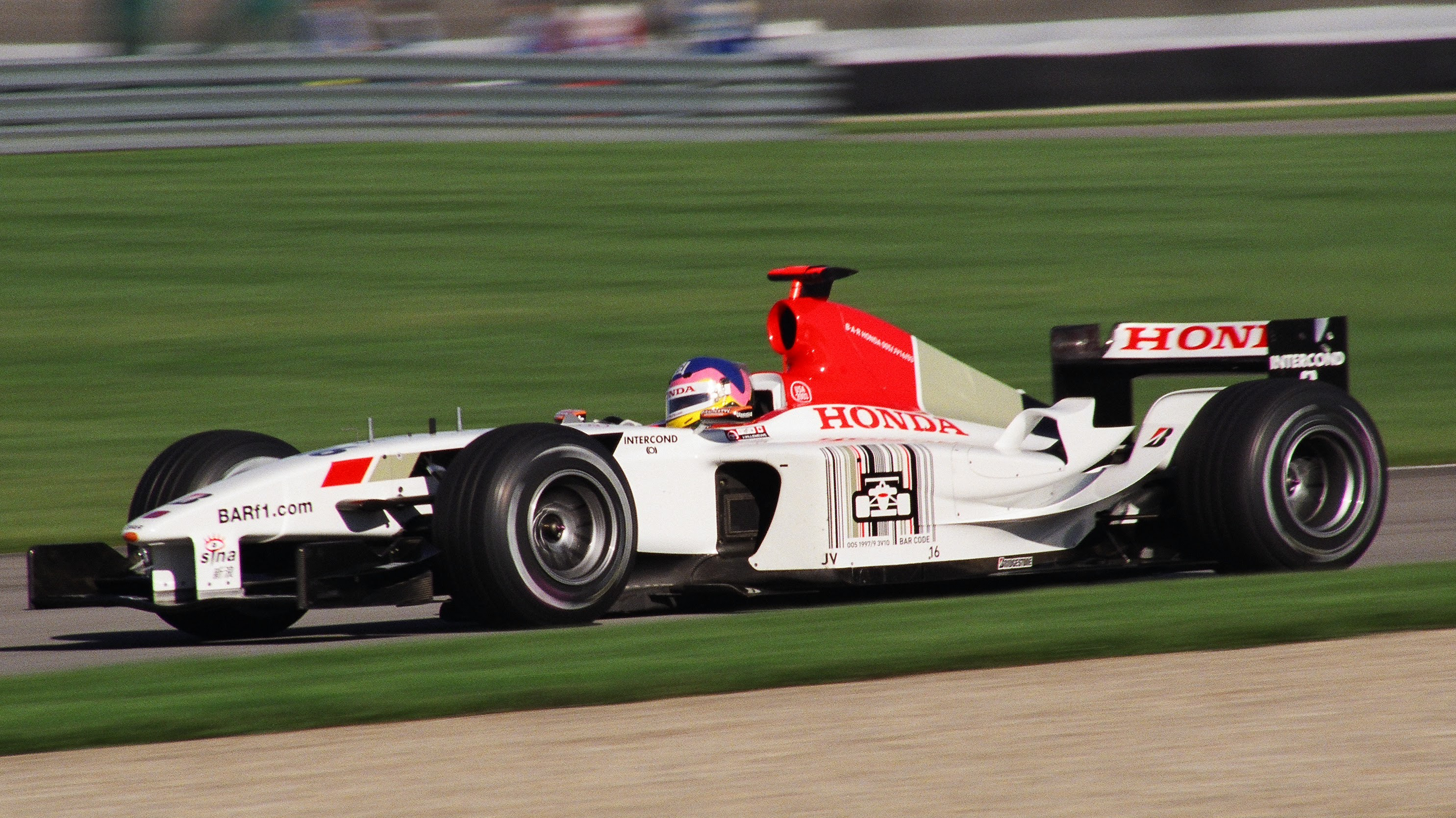
Jacques Villeneuve driving the BAR 005 with non-tobacco livery replaced with bar code and F1 cars at the 2003 United States Grand Prix.

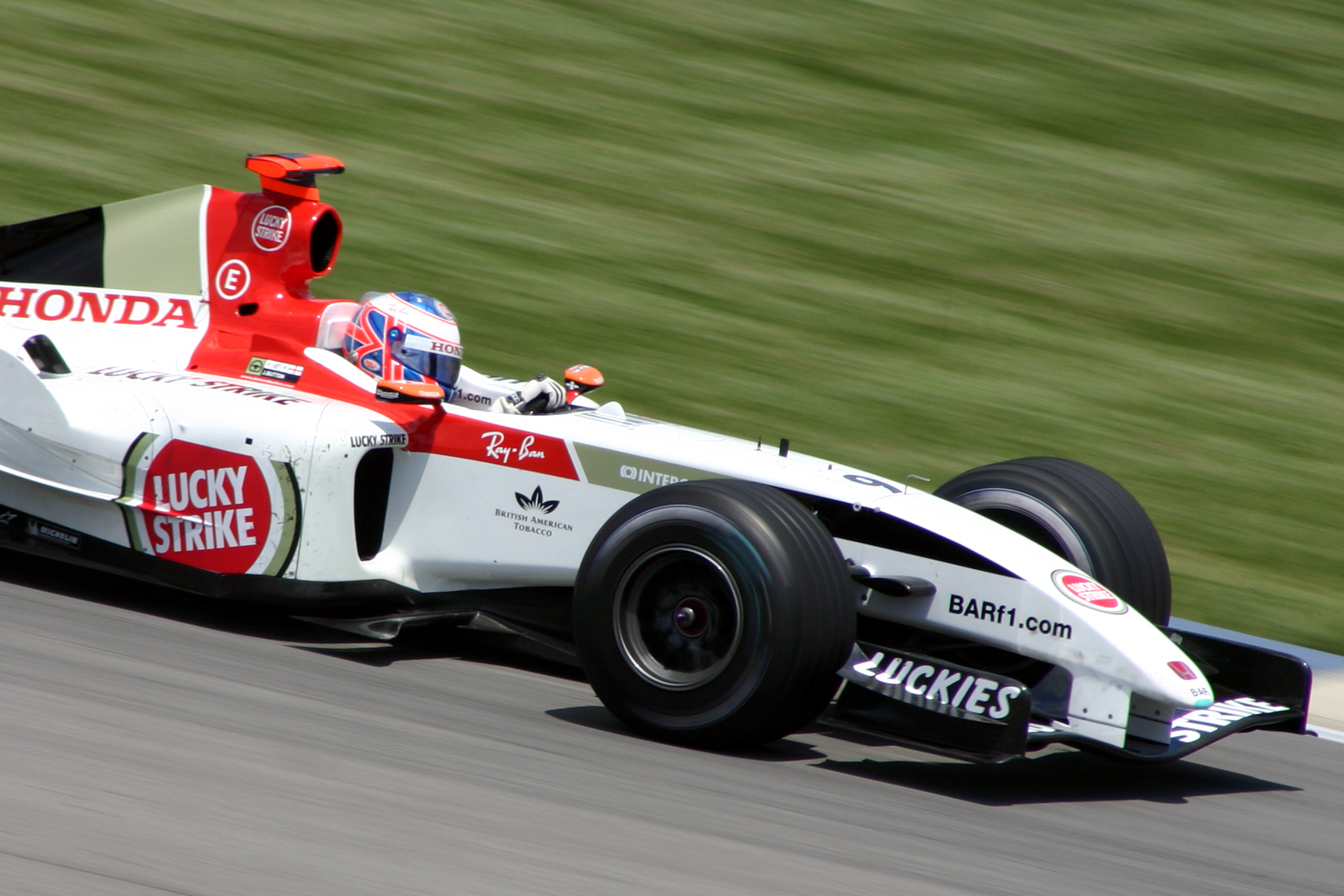
Jenson Button driving the BAR 006 at the 2004 United States Grand Prix.

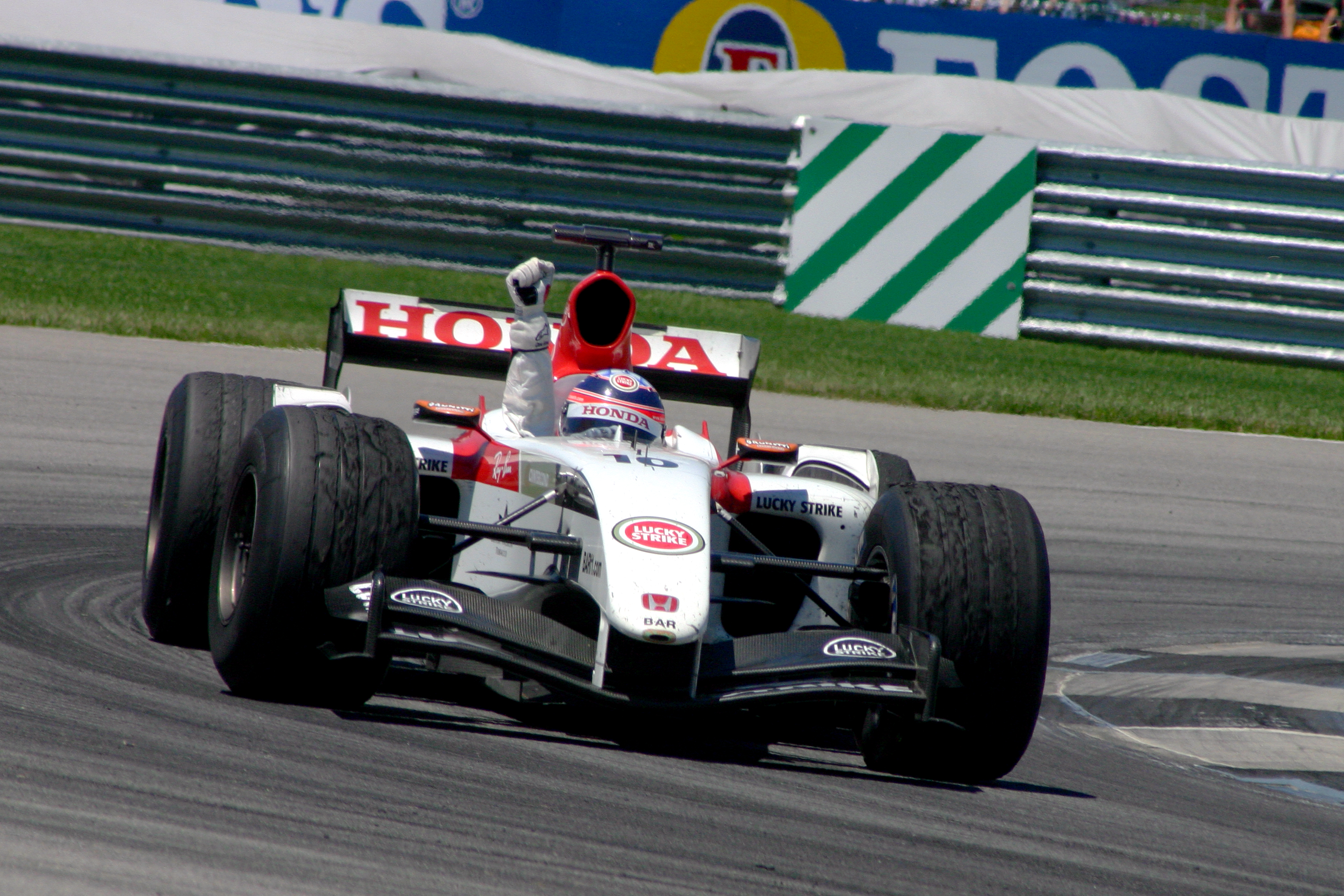
Takuma Sato celebrating his podium at the 2004 United States GP

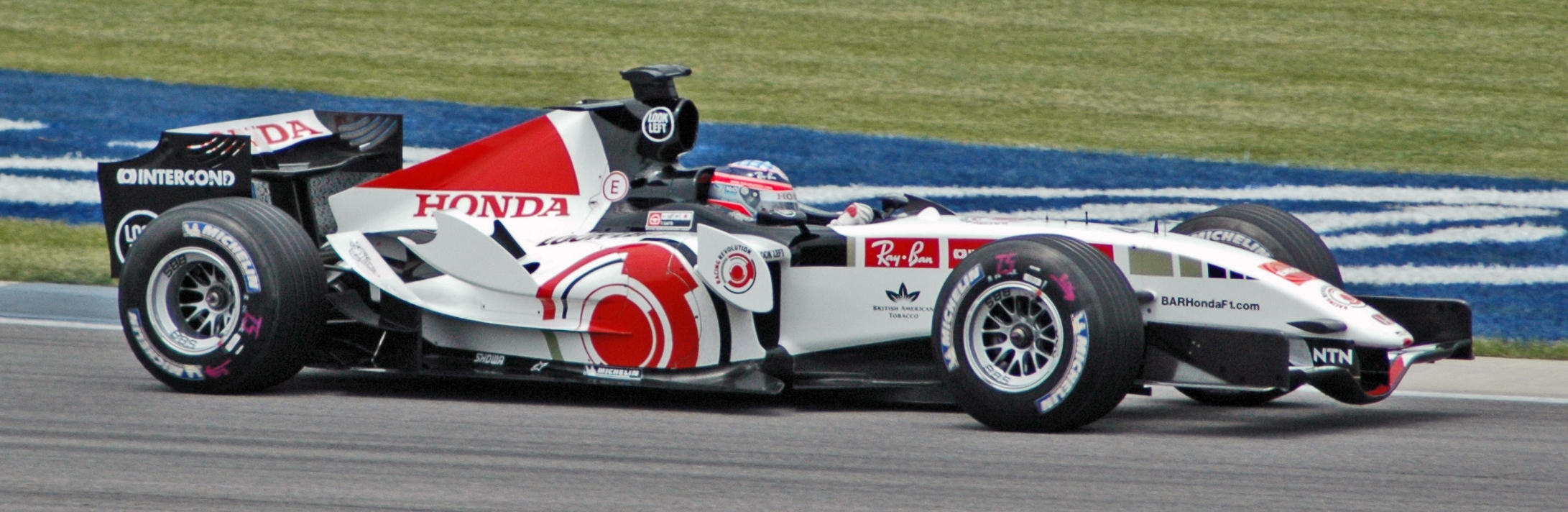
Takuma Sato driving the BAR 007 with "Racing Revolution" logo at the 2005 United States Grand Prix.

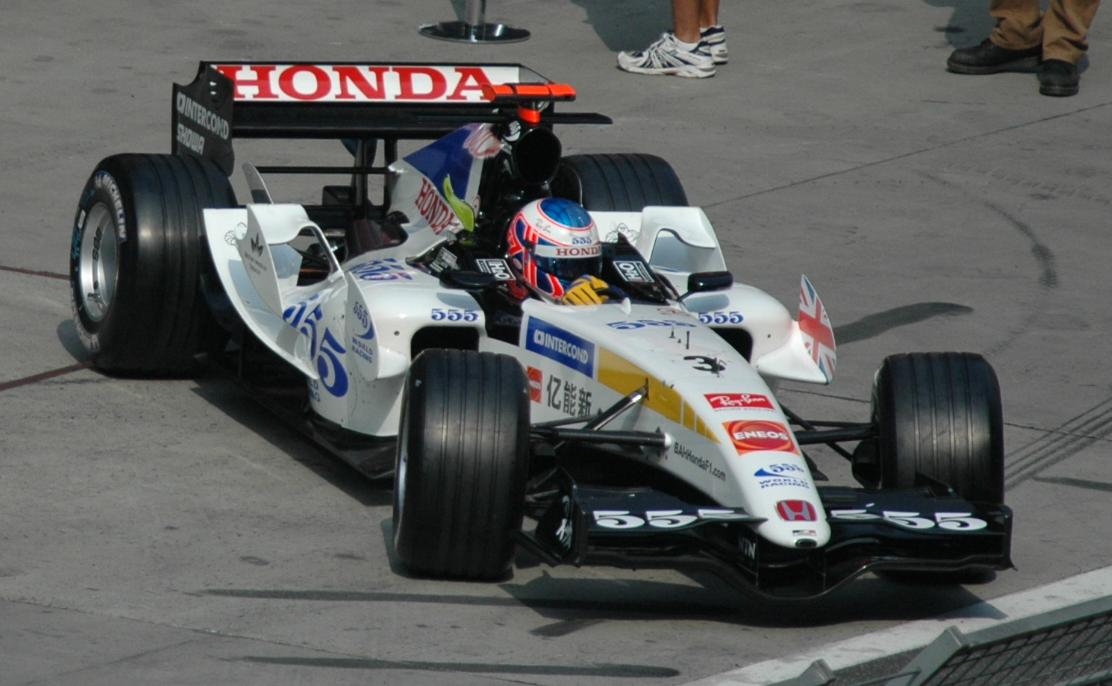
Jenson Button driving the BAR 007 with "555 World Racing" livery at the 2005 Chinese Grand Prix.

== British Racing Motors ==
The first cars entered by the BRM works team were a pale duck-egg green (any shade of green represented British racing green, the national racing colour of Great Britain), but this was later replaced for aesthetic reasons by a very dark metallic shade of grey-green. BRM cars entered by non-British privateer teams wore their respective national racing colours. The team acquired their first significant commercial sponsorship from Yardley for the 1970 season, running in white with black, gold and ochre stripes in a stylised "Y" wrapping around the car's bodywork. In the 1972 season the team became the first F1 team sponsored by Marlboro and at the 1972 Monaco Grand Prix the BRM team achieved the first win for a Marlboro-sponsored F1 car.

Year	Main colour(s)	Additional colour(s)	Main sponsor(s)	Additional major sponsor(s)	Other Informations (including non-tobacco/alcohol race changes)
1951–59	Dark Metallic Gray-Green				
1960–64	Black	none			
1964–70	Black	Orange/Red			
1970–1971	White	Gold, Black, Ochre	Yardley		
1972–1974	White	Red	Marlboro		
1974	Pale Green		Motul		
1975-1976	Blue, Red				
1977	Pale Blue		Rotary Watches		

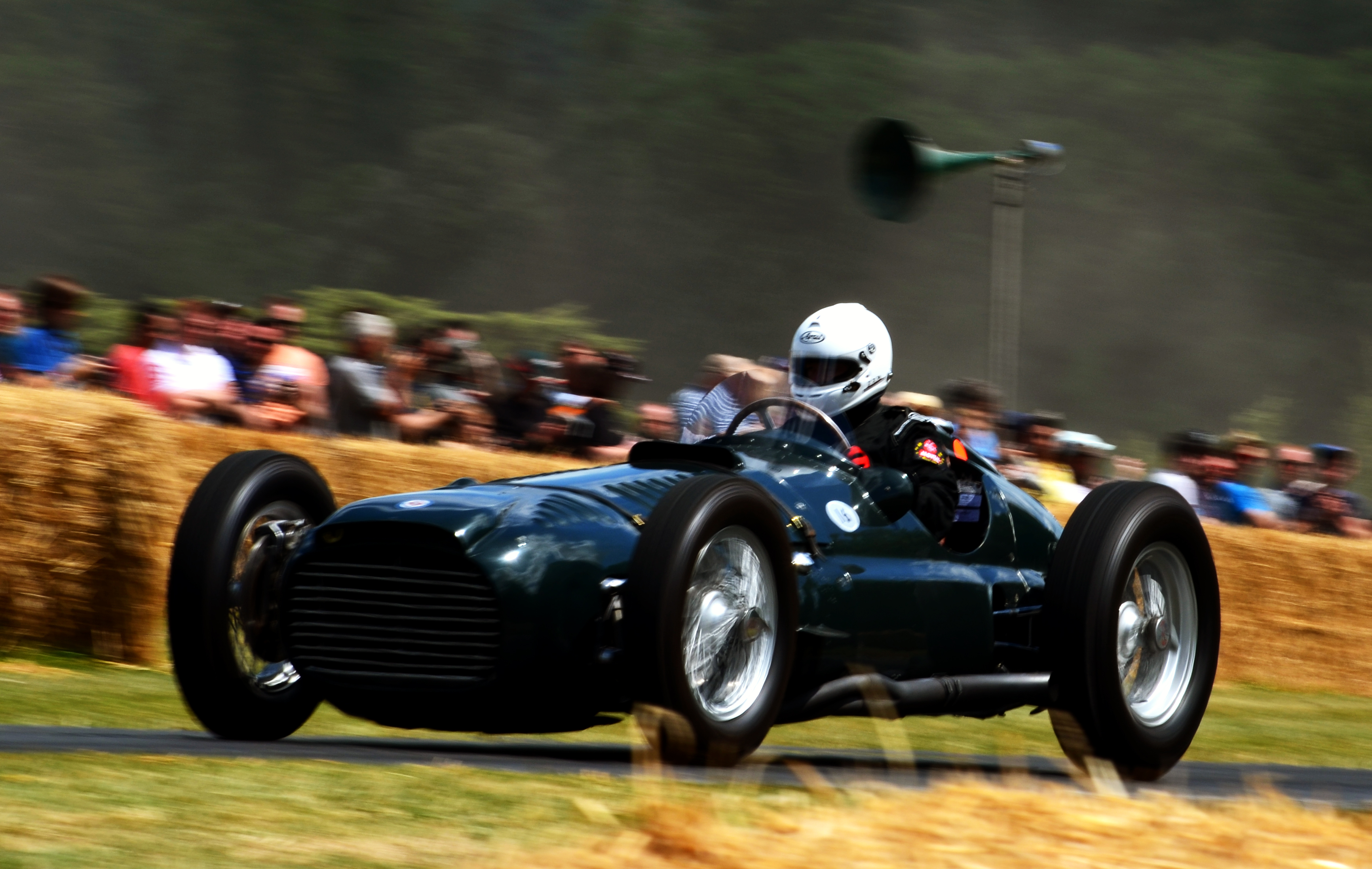
A BRM Type 15 from 1951 season

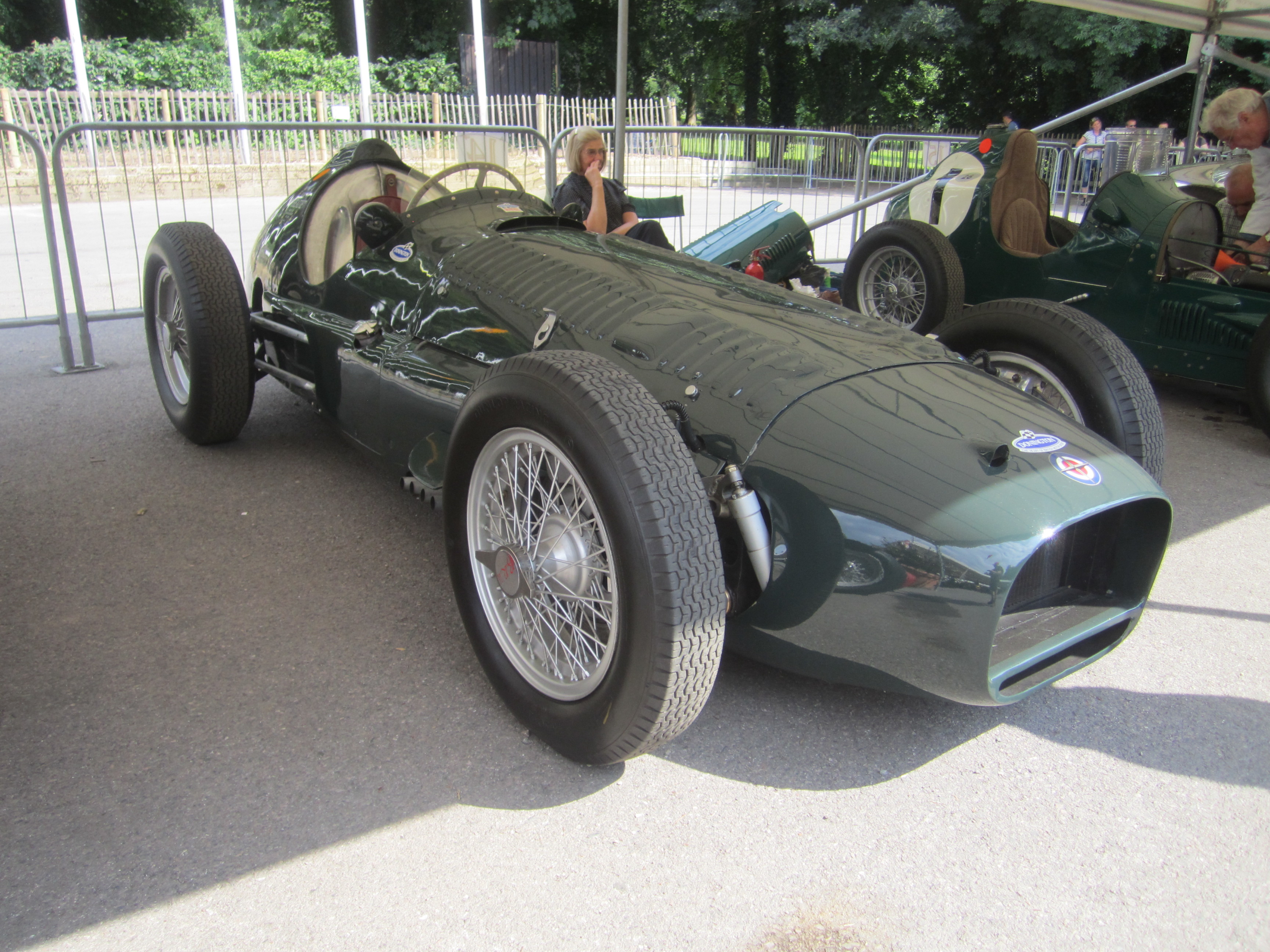
A BRM P30 MKII from the 1953 season

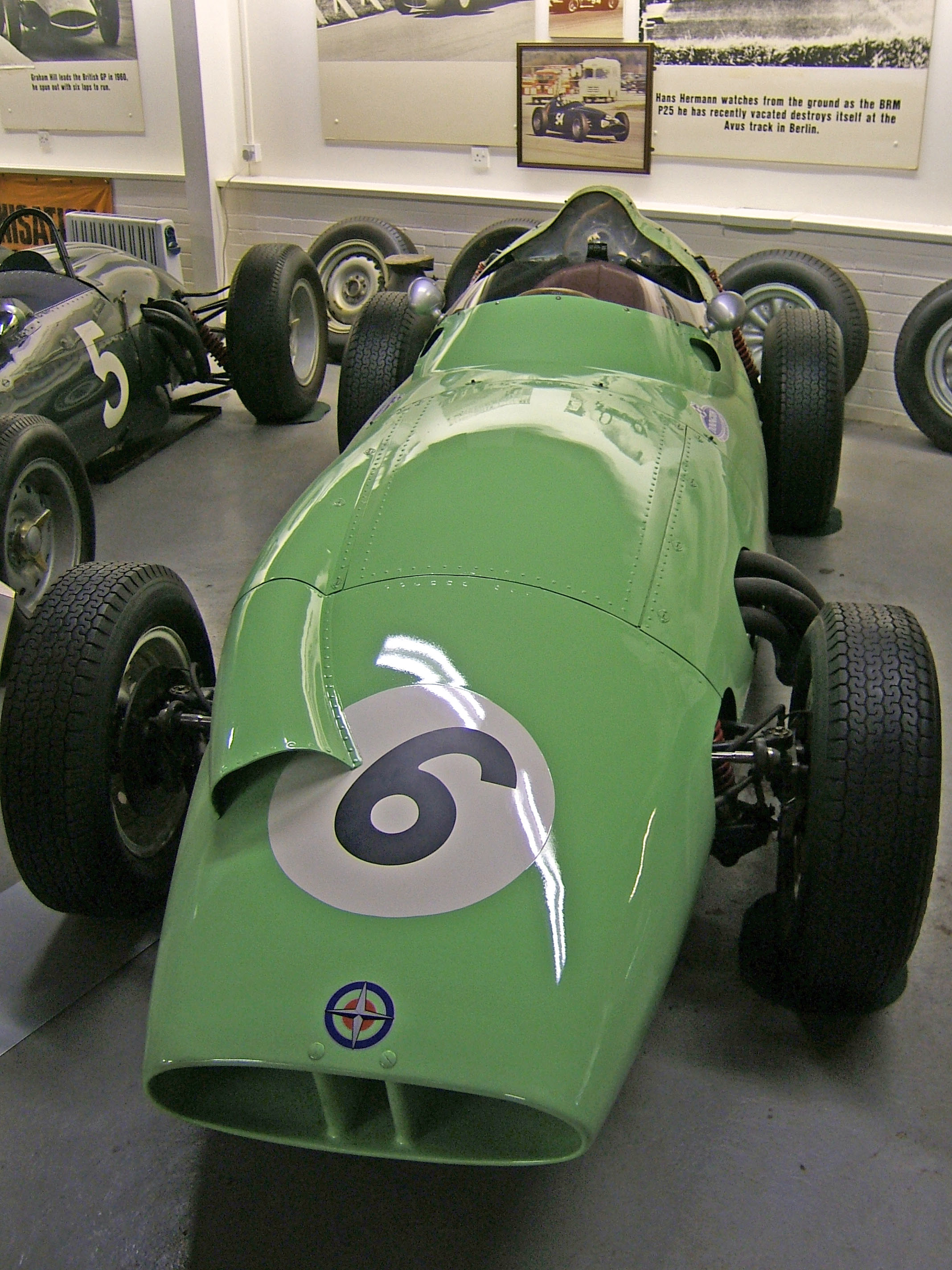
The British Racing Partnership privately entered BRM P25 with which Stirling Moss took second place in the 1959 British Grand Prix.

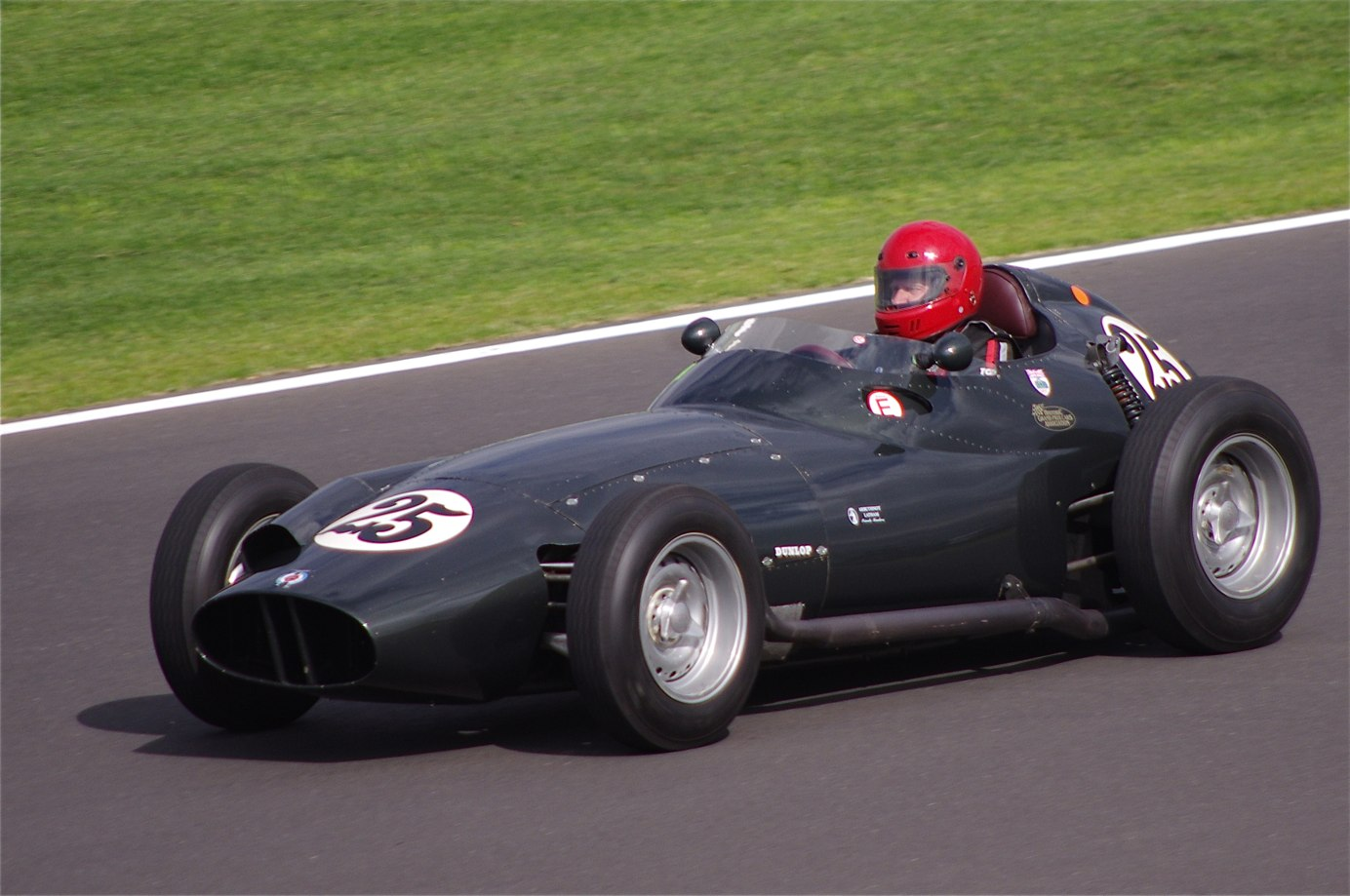
A BRM P25 with its black livery at Silverstone Classic

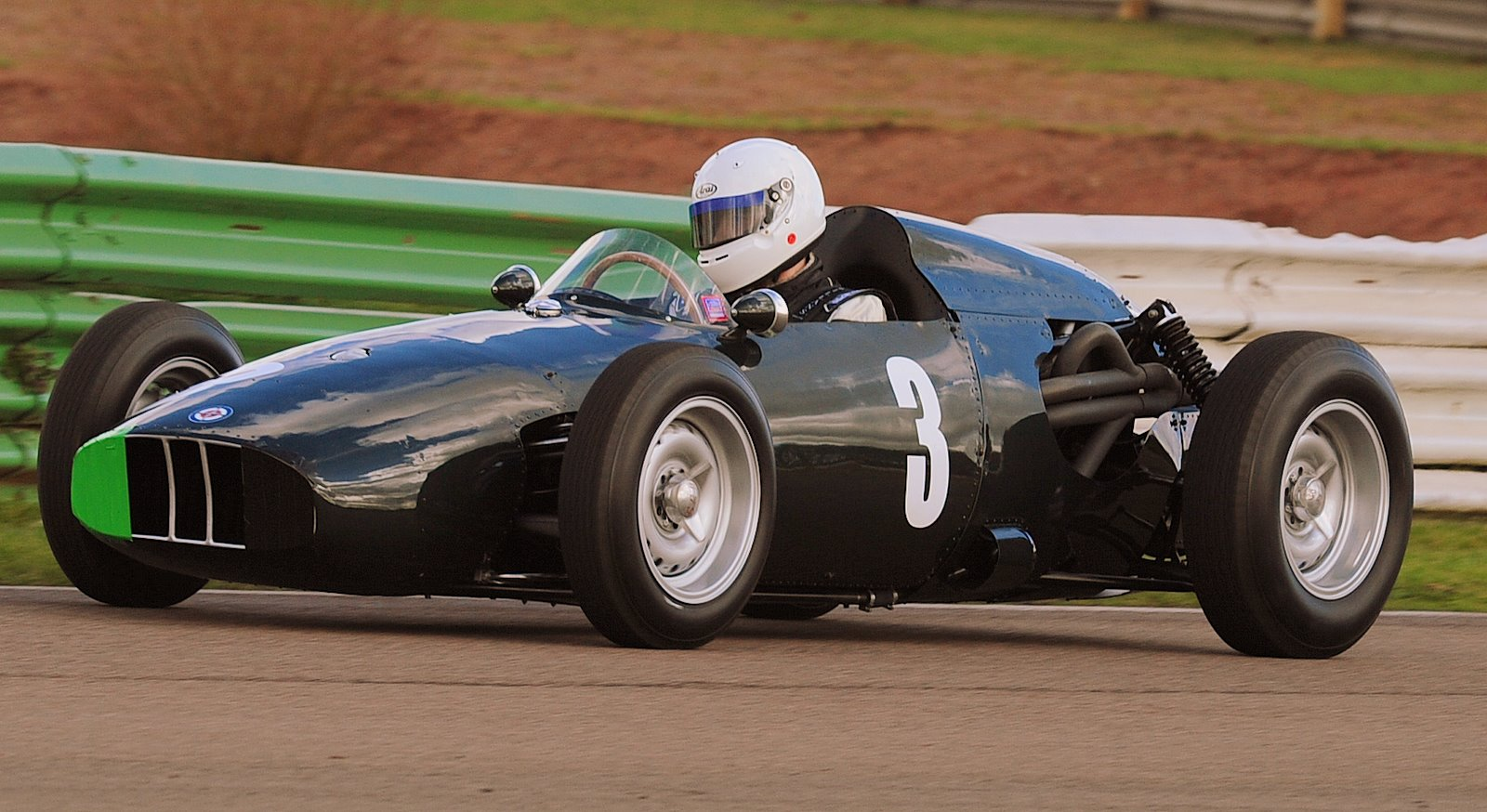
A BRM P48 from 1960 season being demonstrated at Mallory Park

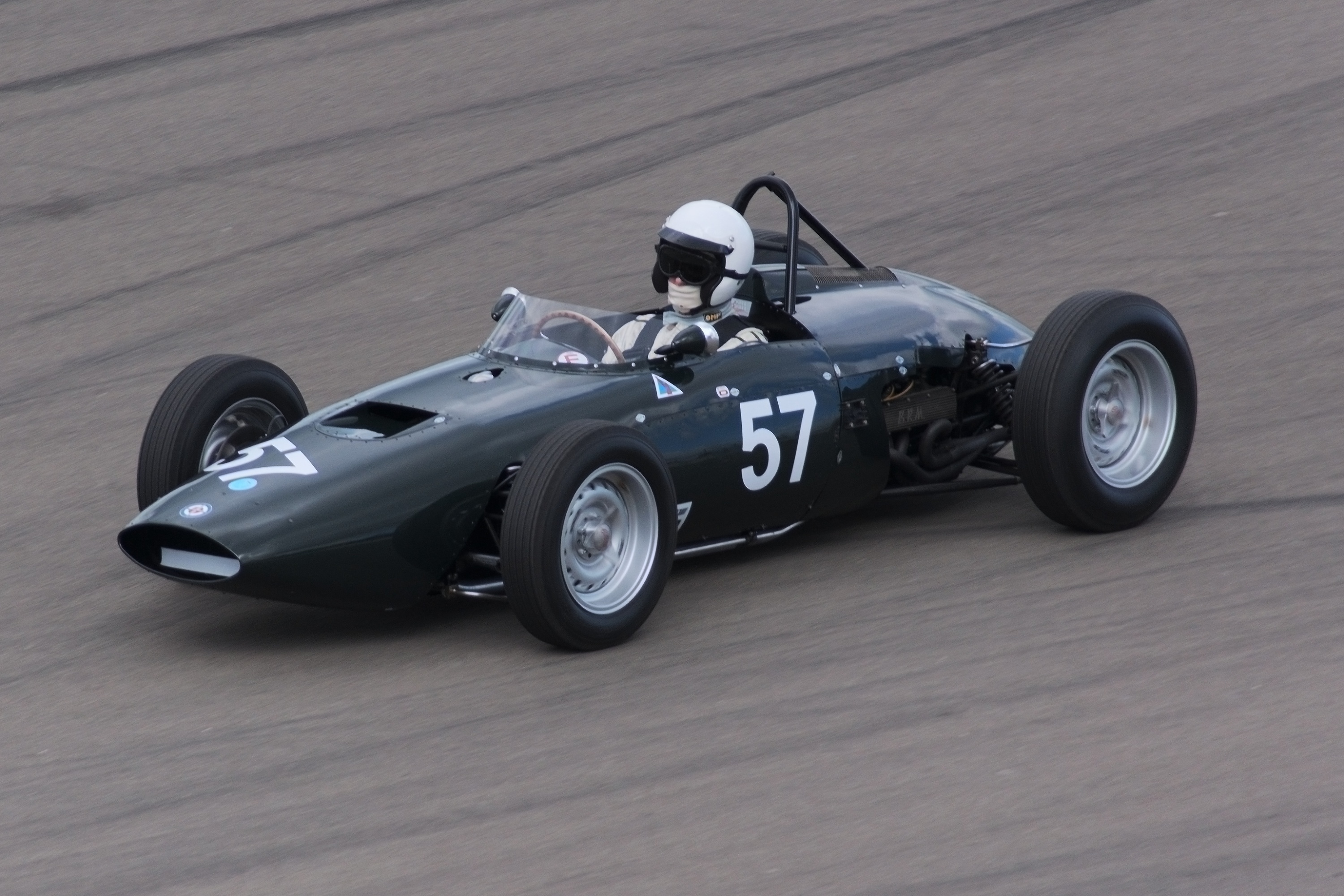
A BRM P57 from 1962 season seen in action.

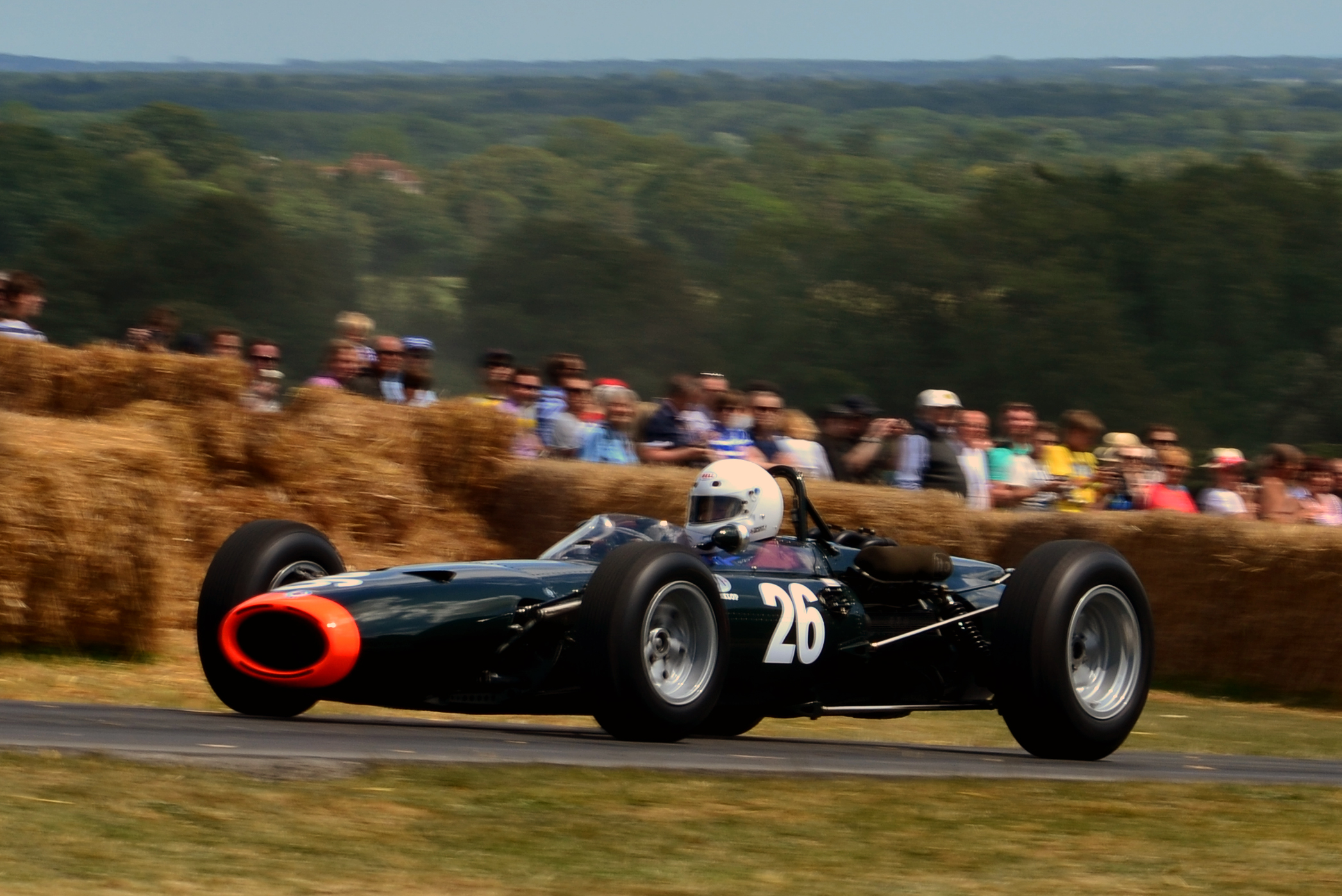
A BRM P261 from 1964 season being demonstrated at Goodwood Festival of Speed

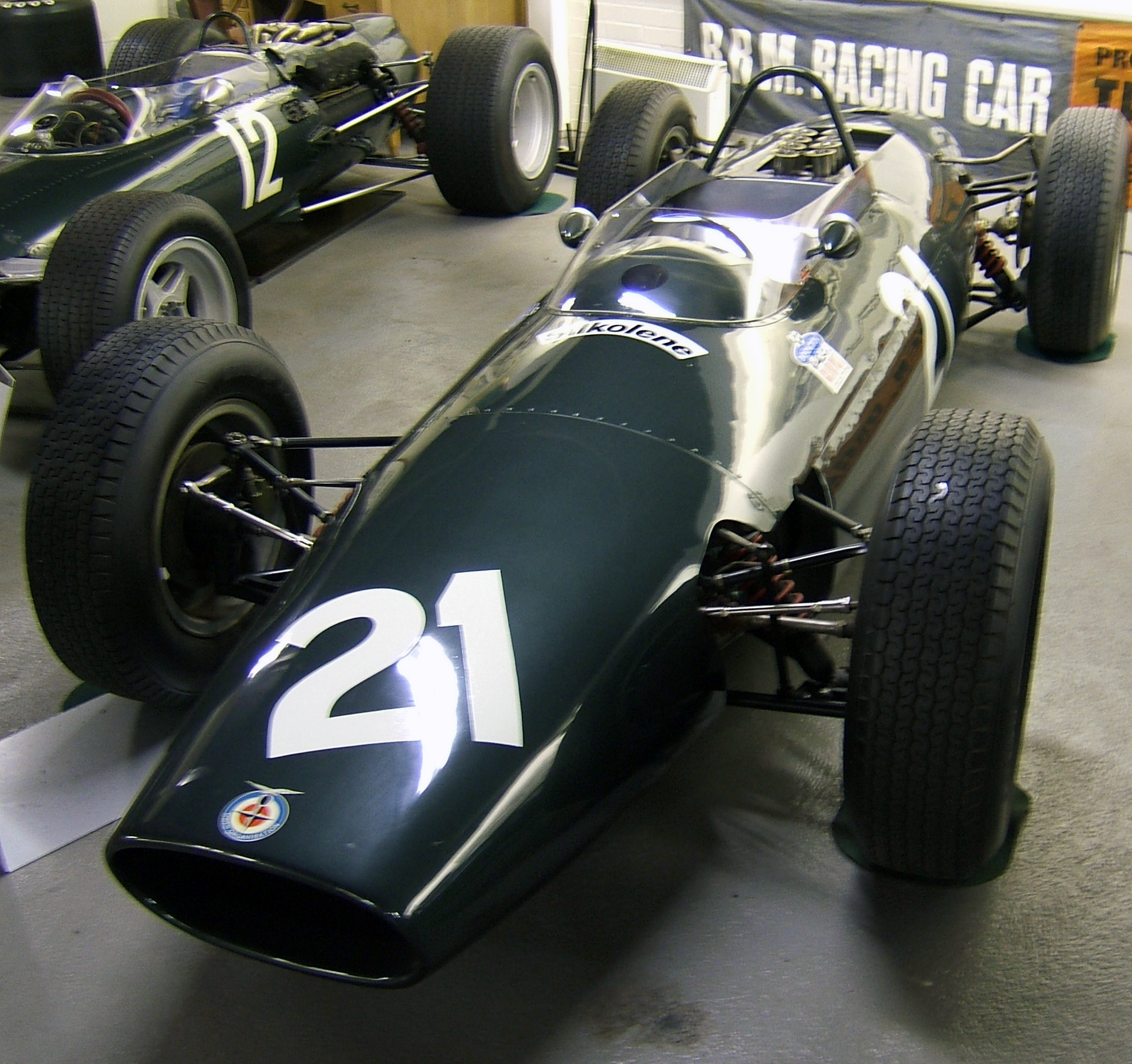
The four wheel-drive BRM P67 from the 1964 season

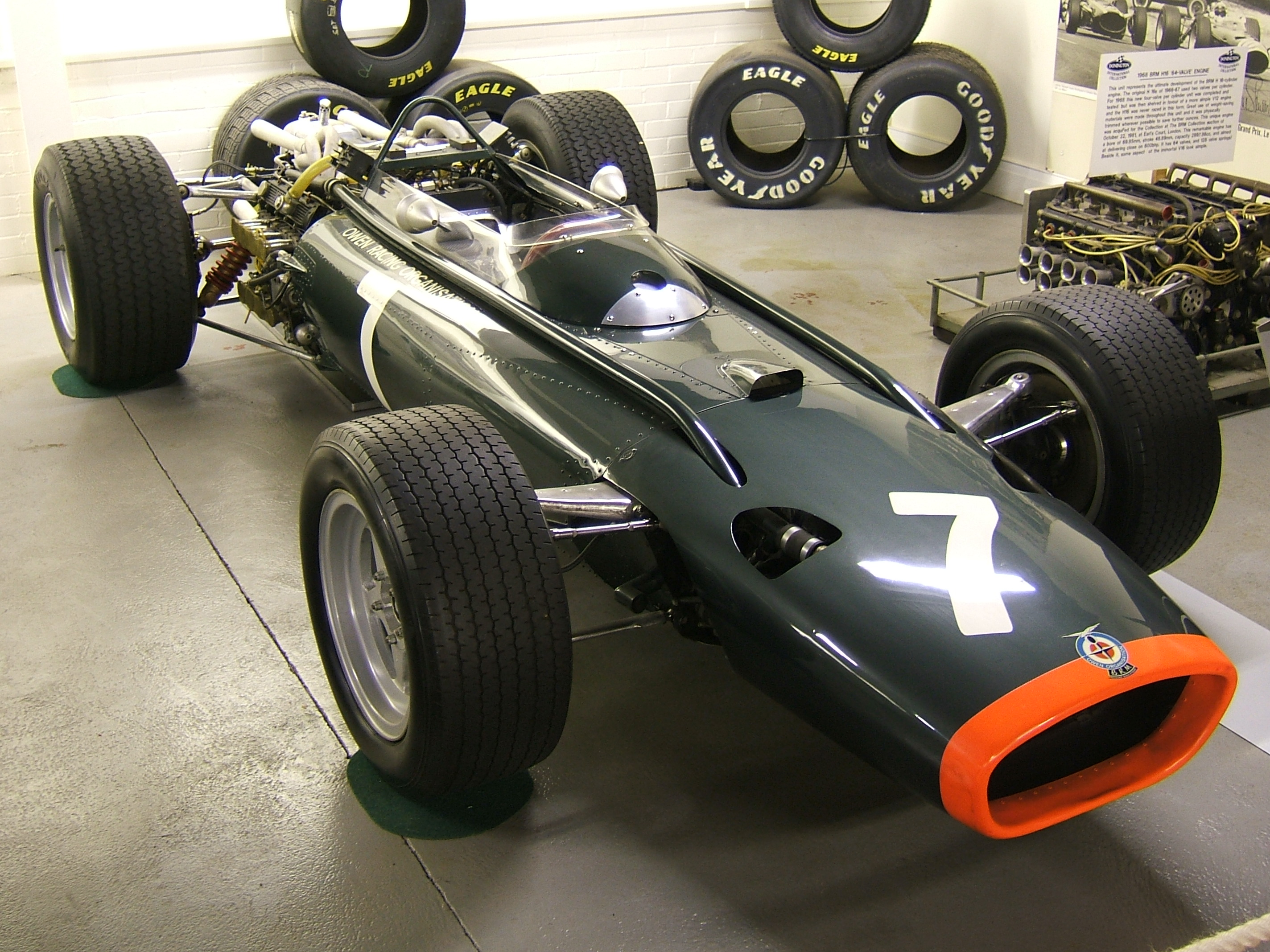
A BRM P83 from 1966 season

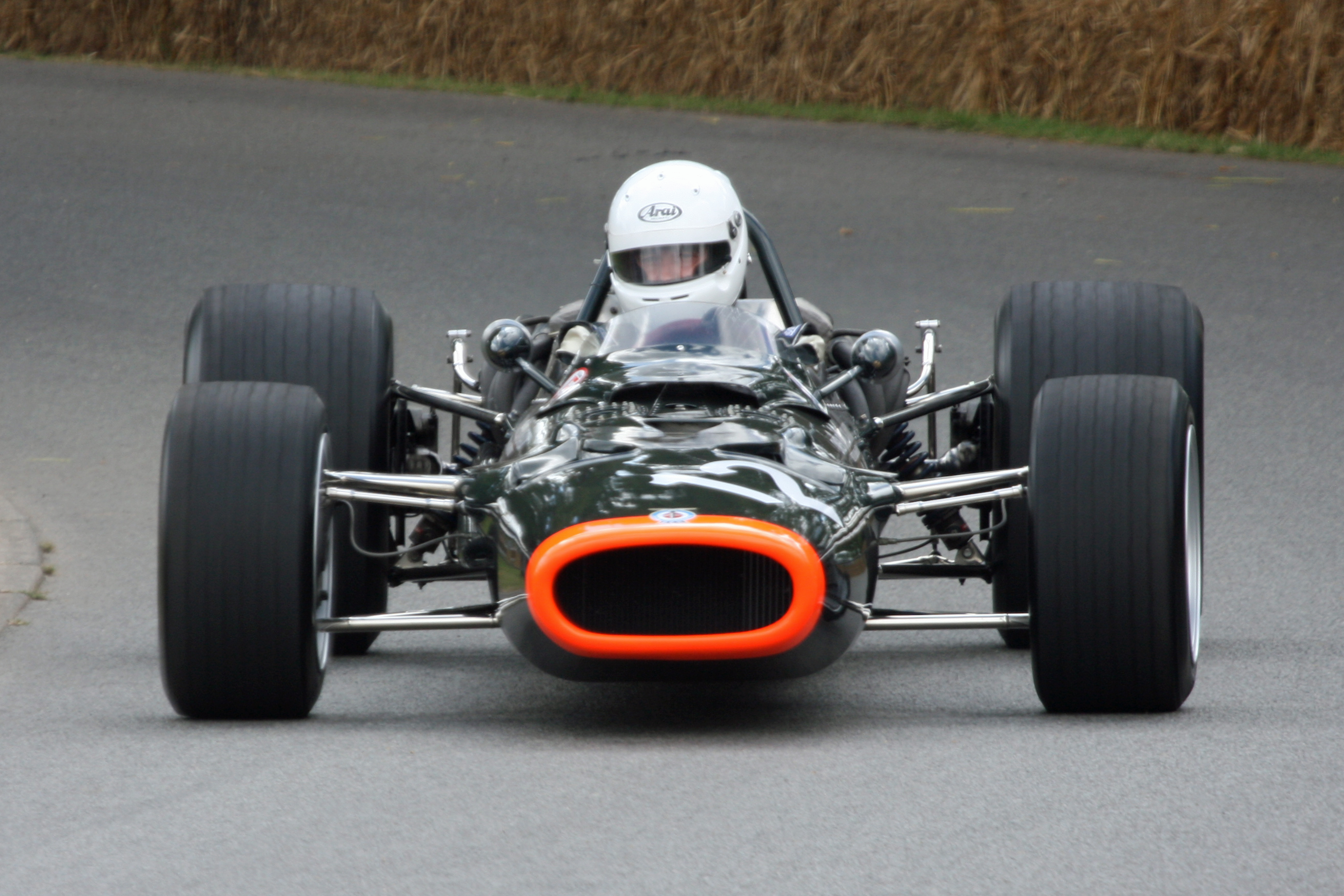
A BRM P126 from 1968 season

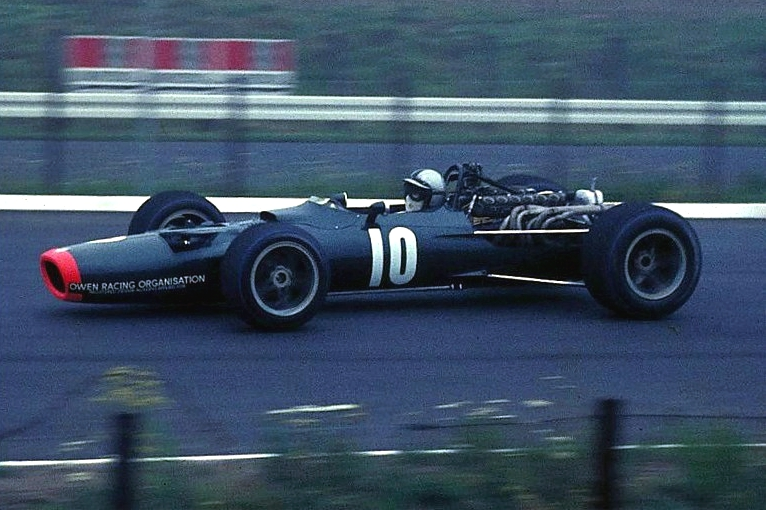
Pedro Rodriguez with BRM 1968

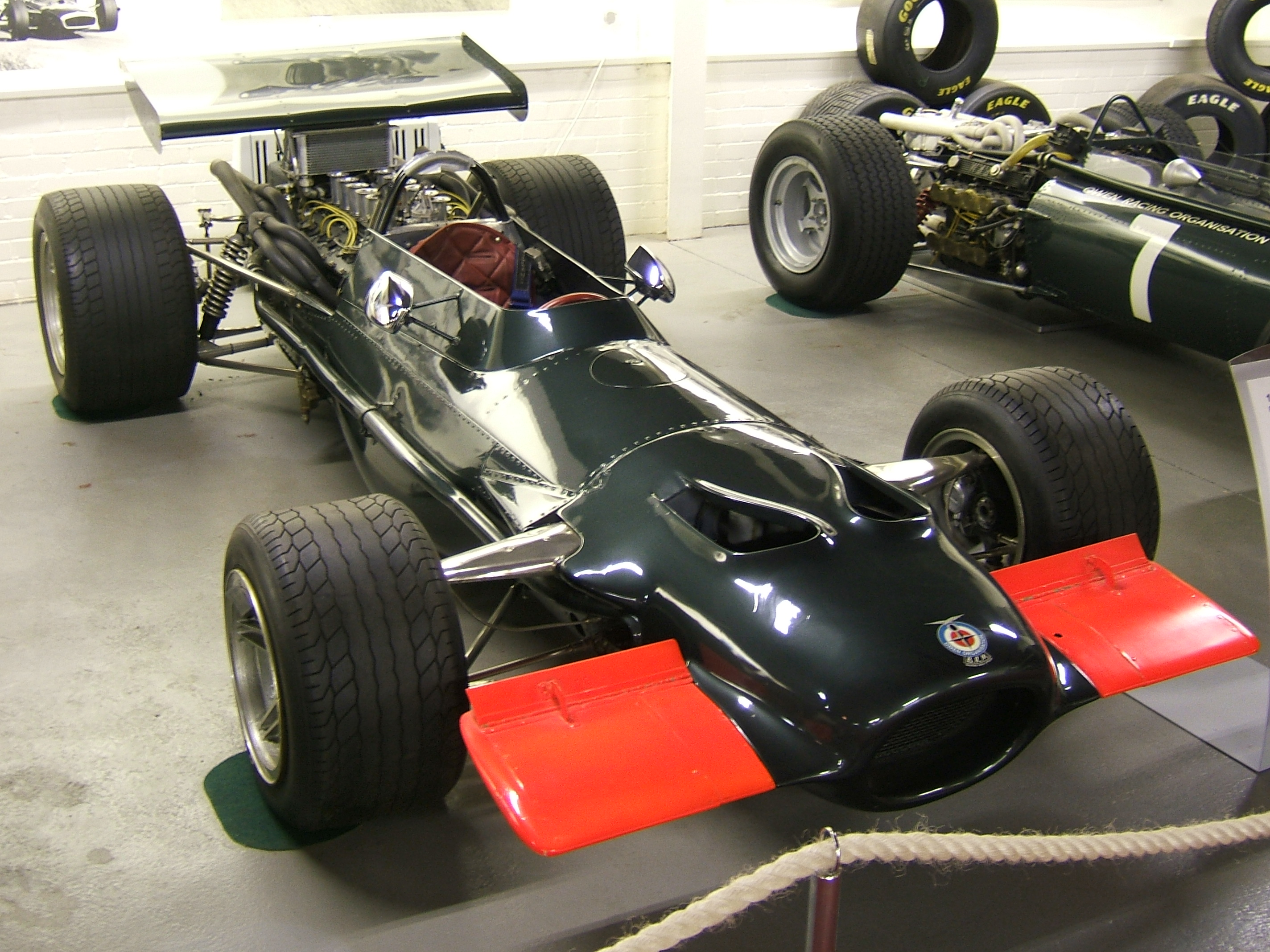
A 1969 BRM P139

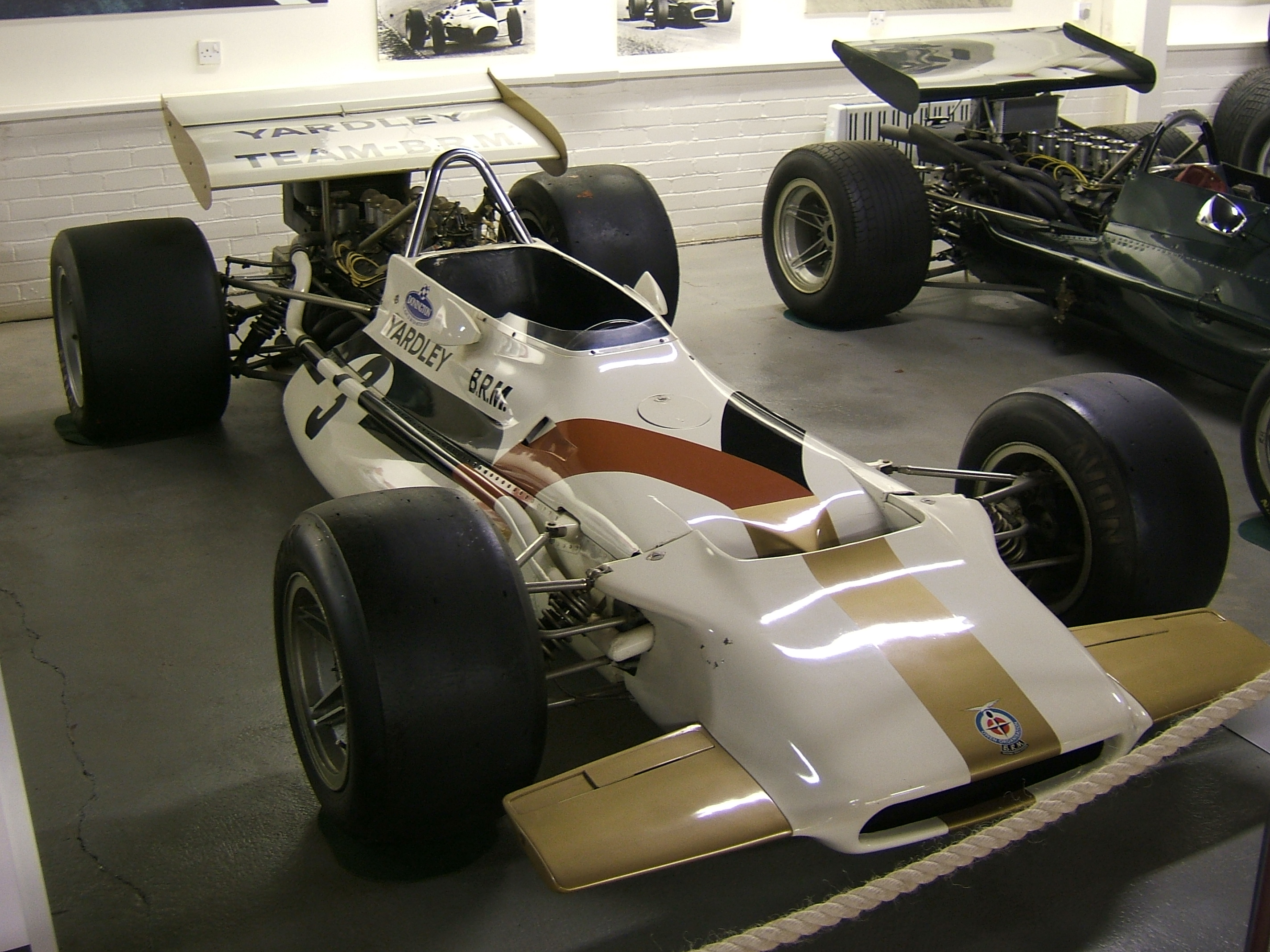
A 1970 BRM in Yardley Livery

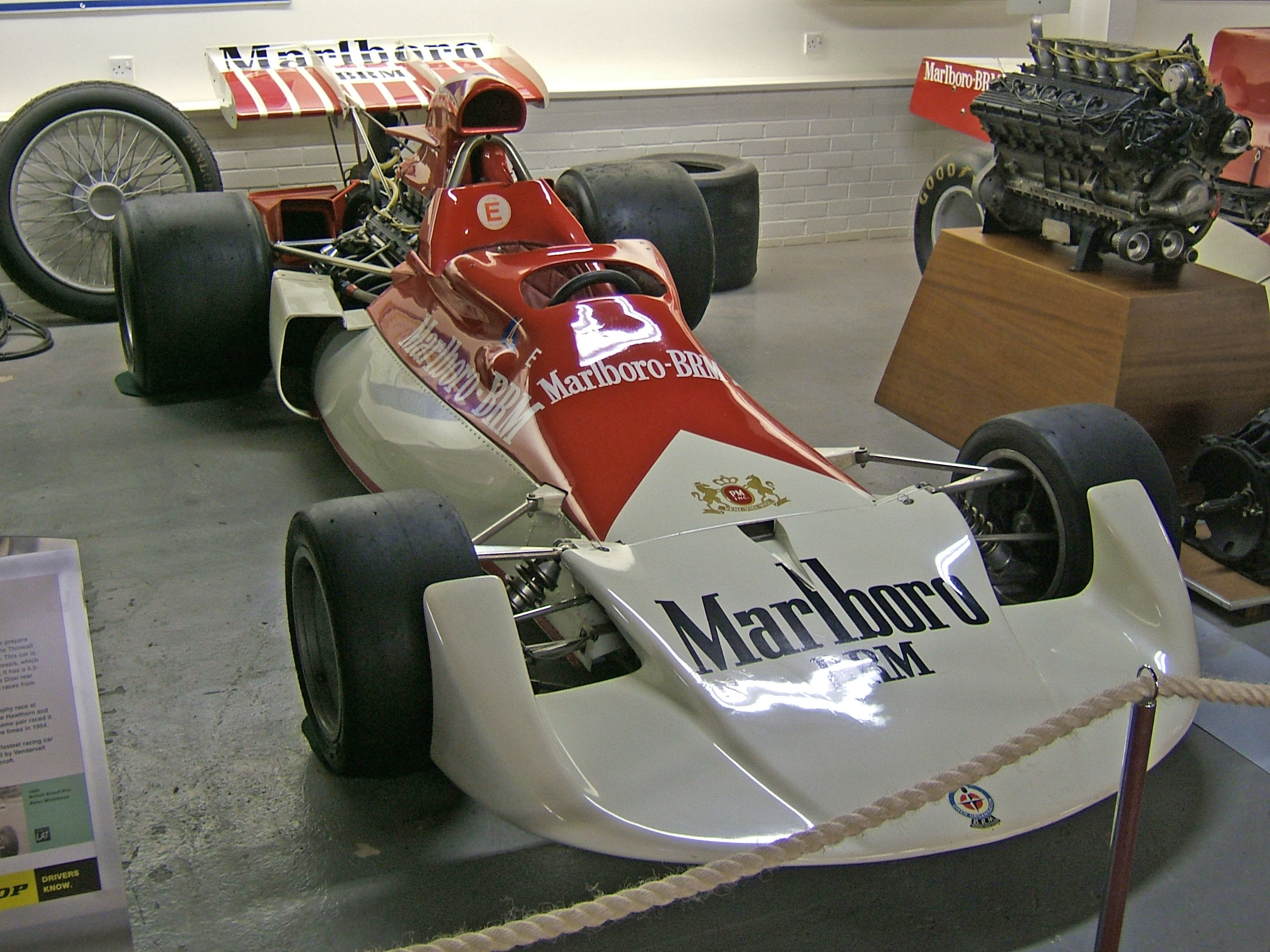
A 1972 BRM in Marlboro Livery

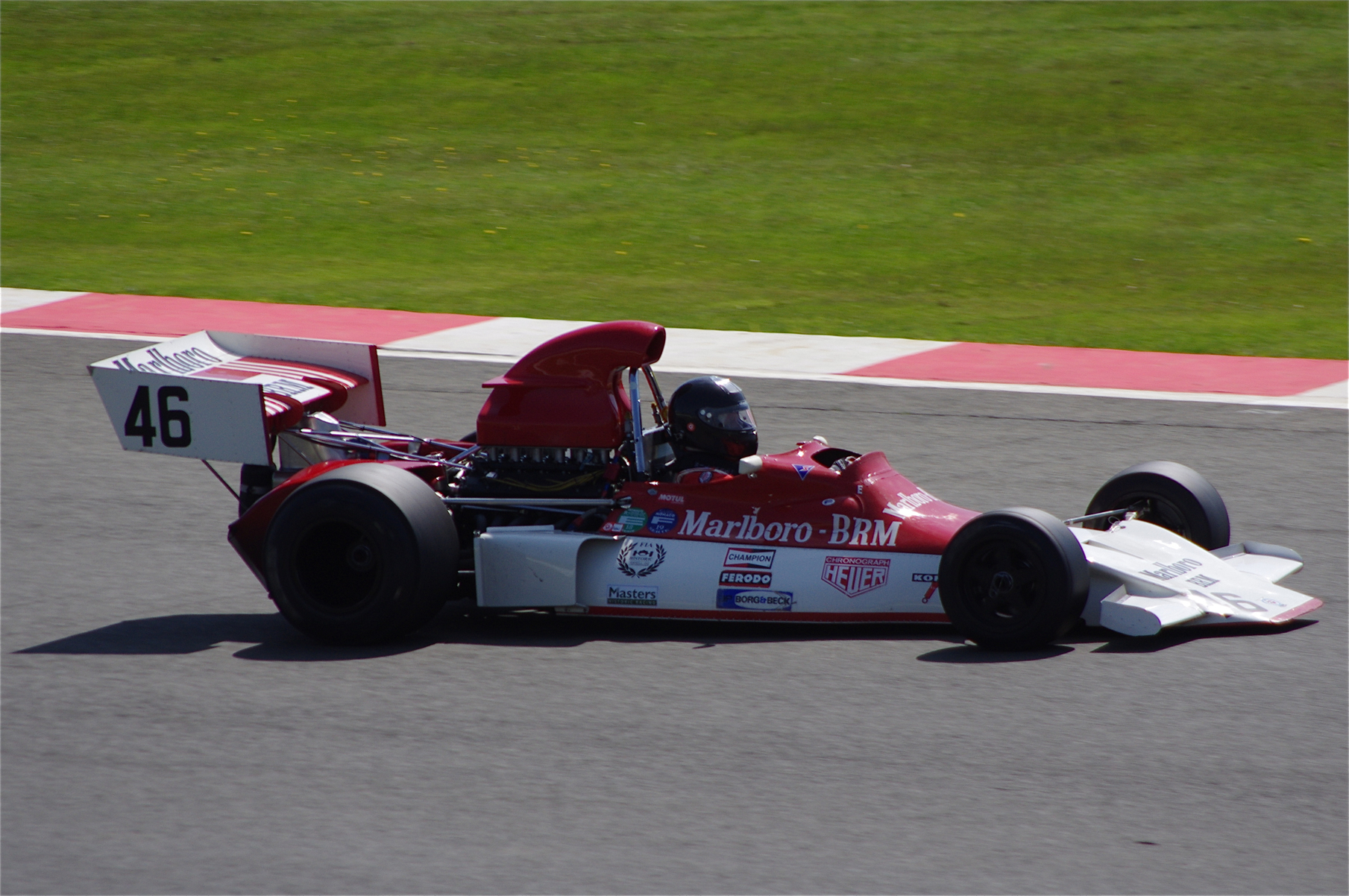
A 1973 BRM in Marlboro Livery

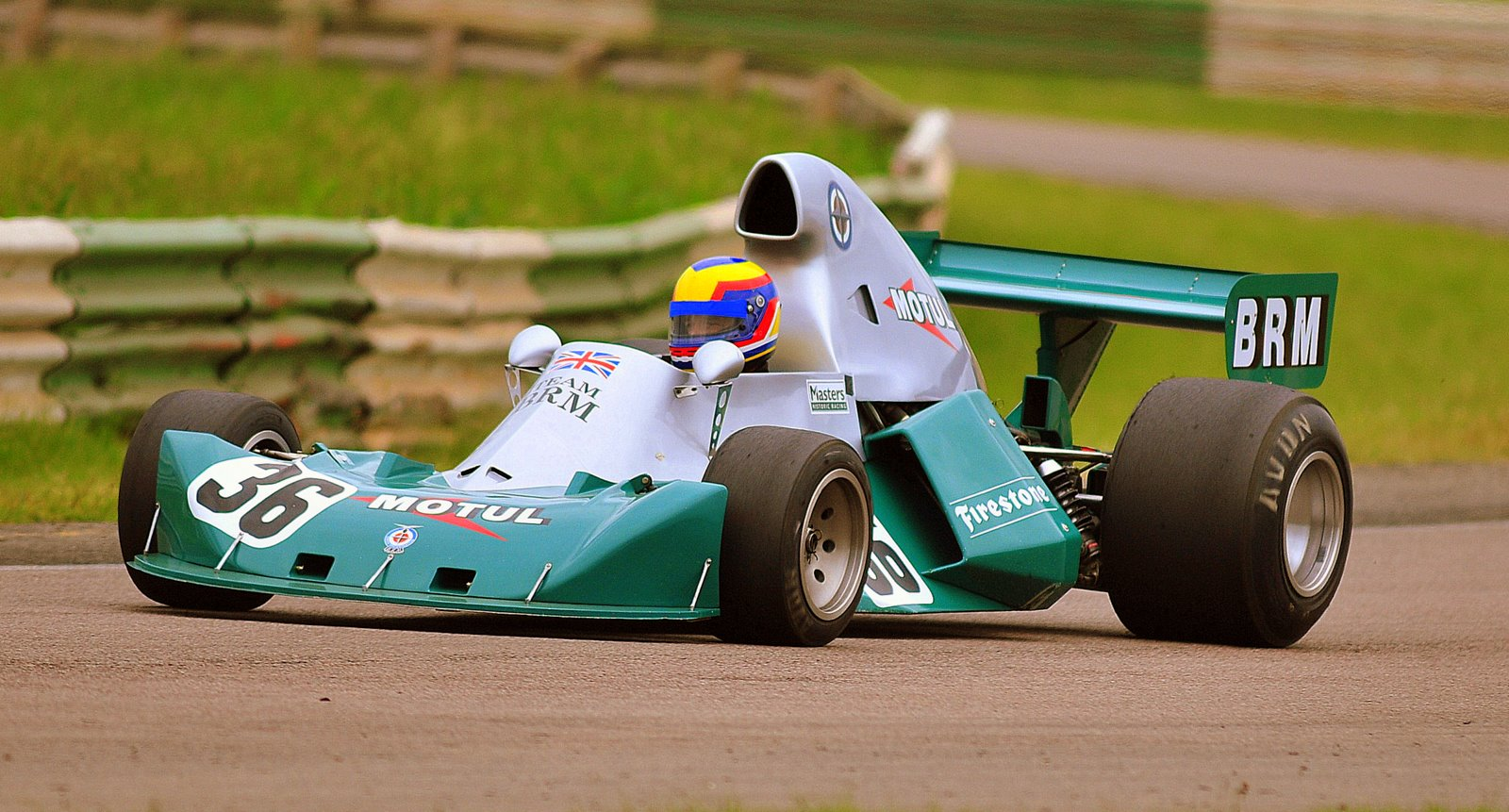
A BRM P201 from 1974 being demonstrated at Mallory Park

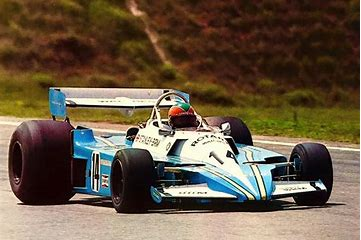
A BRM P207, 1977, with Rotary Watches livery

== Cadillac ==
Cadillac entered Formula One in 2026.

Year	Main colour(s)	Additional colour(s)	Main sponsor(s)	Additional major sponsor(s)	Notes
2026	White, Black		Cadillac, TWG AI	Claro, Core Scientific, Gainbridge, IFS, Jim Beam, Telcel, Tenneco, Tommy Hilfiger, Pirelli, 3M, Frontieras, TWG Motorsports, GM	Cadillac introduced a symmetrical livery at the Austrian Grand Prix, citing positive fan reception to the Miami Grand Prix livery. At the Miami Grand Prix, Cadillac featured a livery consisting of the Stars and Stripes motif into Cadillac’s signature black and white colour scheme. At the British Grand Prix, Cadillac raced a 4th of July livery to commemorate America's 250th anniversary.

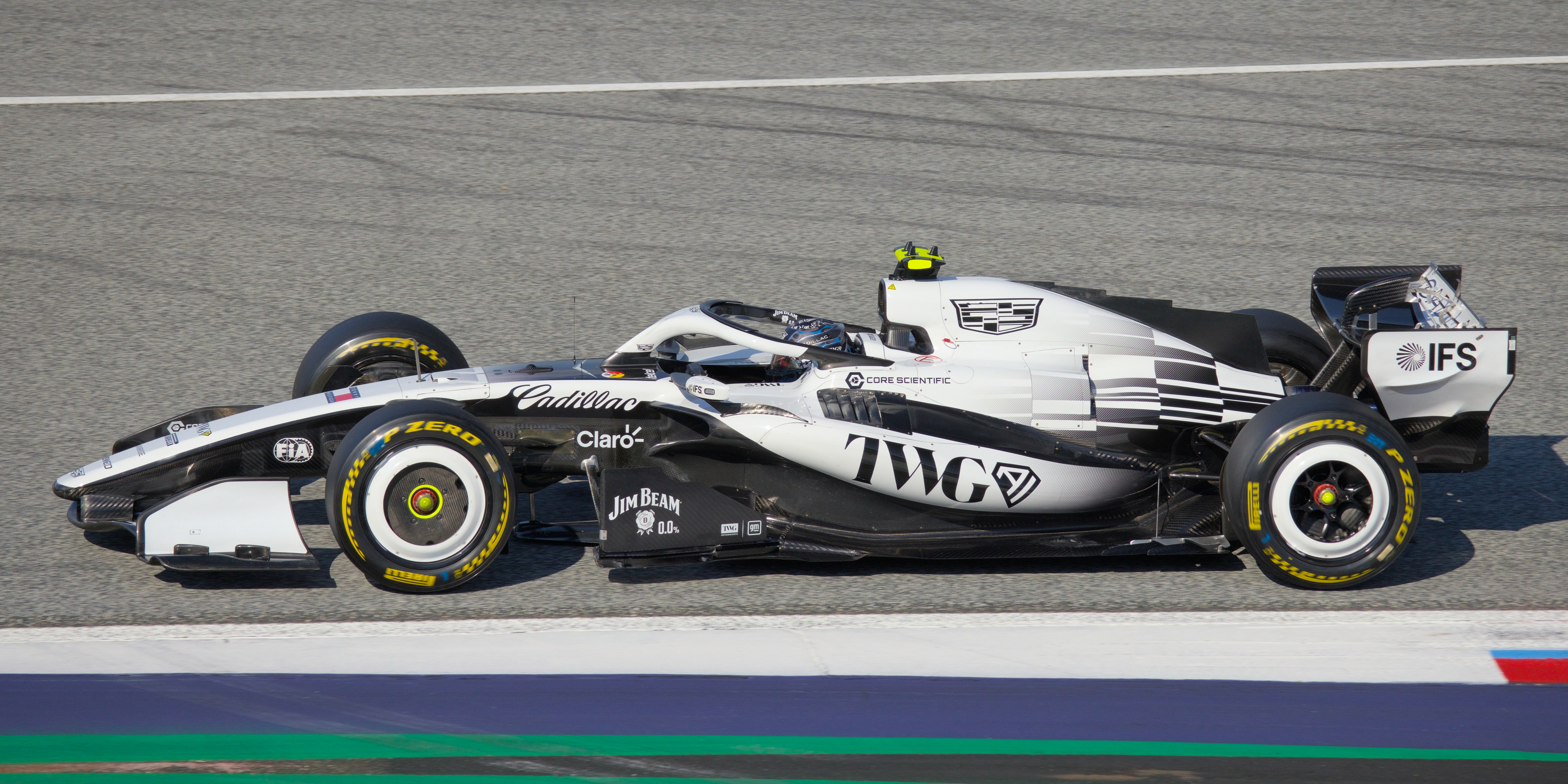
2026: Valtteri Bottas driving the Cadillac MAC-26 at the 2026 Austrian Grand Prix

== Caterham ==
Lotus Racing, later Team Lotus, was renamed to Caterham in 2012 after a dispute on the usage of the Lotus name between team founder and principal Tony Fernandes and Group Lotus. While the team raced with a Malaysian licence, it used a British racing green livery similar to its predecessor team. Caterham then used a lighter green livery for the next two seasons before going into administration.

Year	Main colour(s)	Additional colour(s)	Main sponsor(s)	Additional major sponsor(s)
2012	British racing green	Yellow, White	AirAsia	Naza Group, Renault, EQ8 Energy Drink, CNN, Airbus, Dell, Intel, General Electric, Visa, Sibur, Pirelli, Queens Park Rangers, Tune Group, B.R.M. Chronographes, 1Malaysia, EADS
2013	Light Green	Yellow, White	General Electric, Airbus	McGregor, EADS, Renault, Dell, Intel, AirAsia, Naza Group, CNN, Pirelli, Queens Park Rangers, EQ8 Energy Drink
2014	Light Green	White	General Electric, Airbus	Safran, Renault, Dell, Intel, CNN, Truphone, Naza Group, AirAsia, Pirelli, Silanna, EQ8 Energy Drink

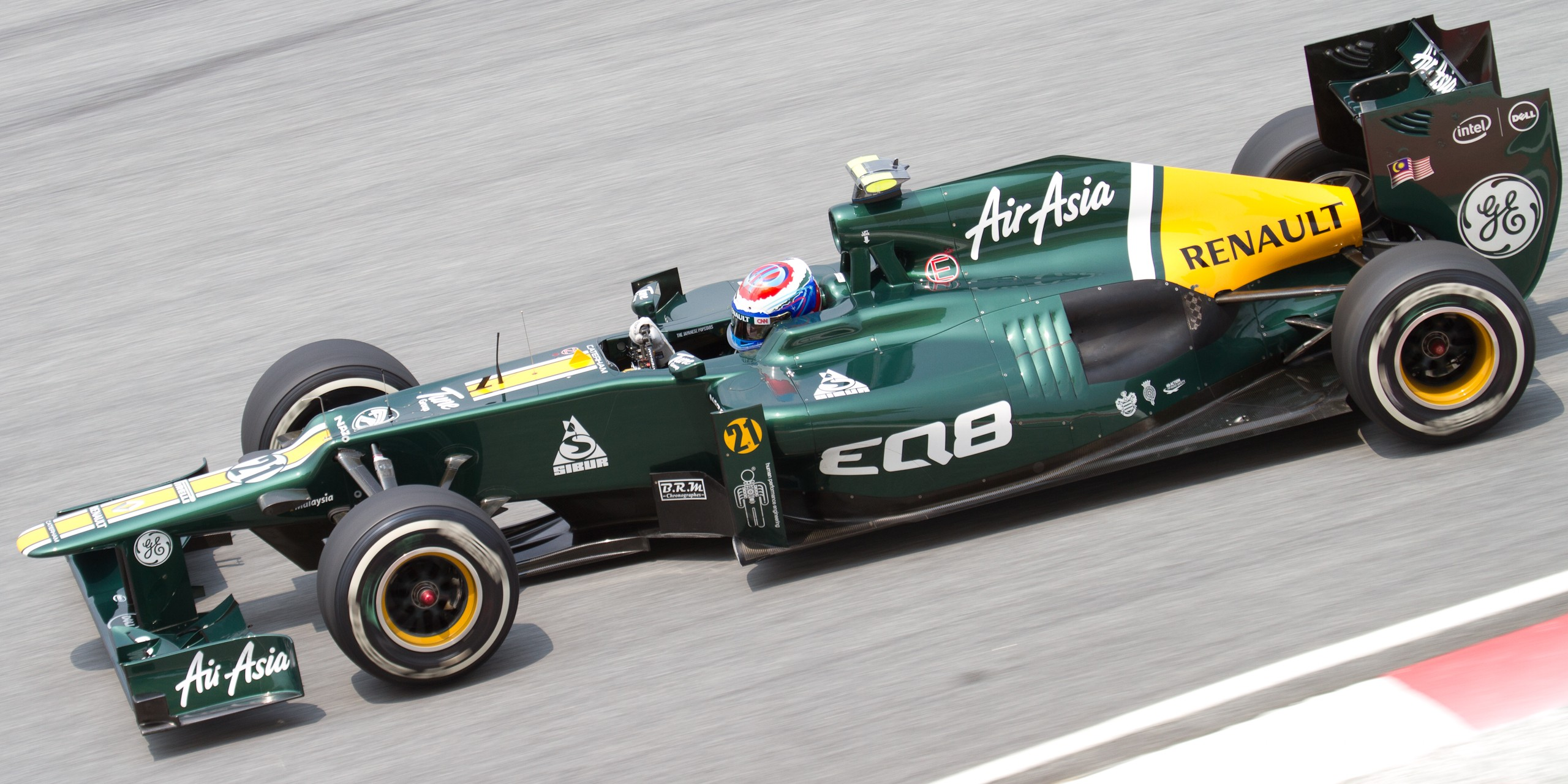
Vitaly Petrov driving the CT01 at the 2012 Malaysian Grand Prix.

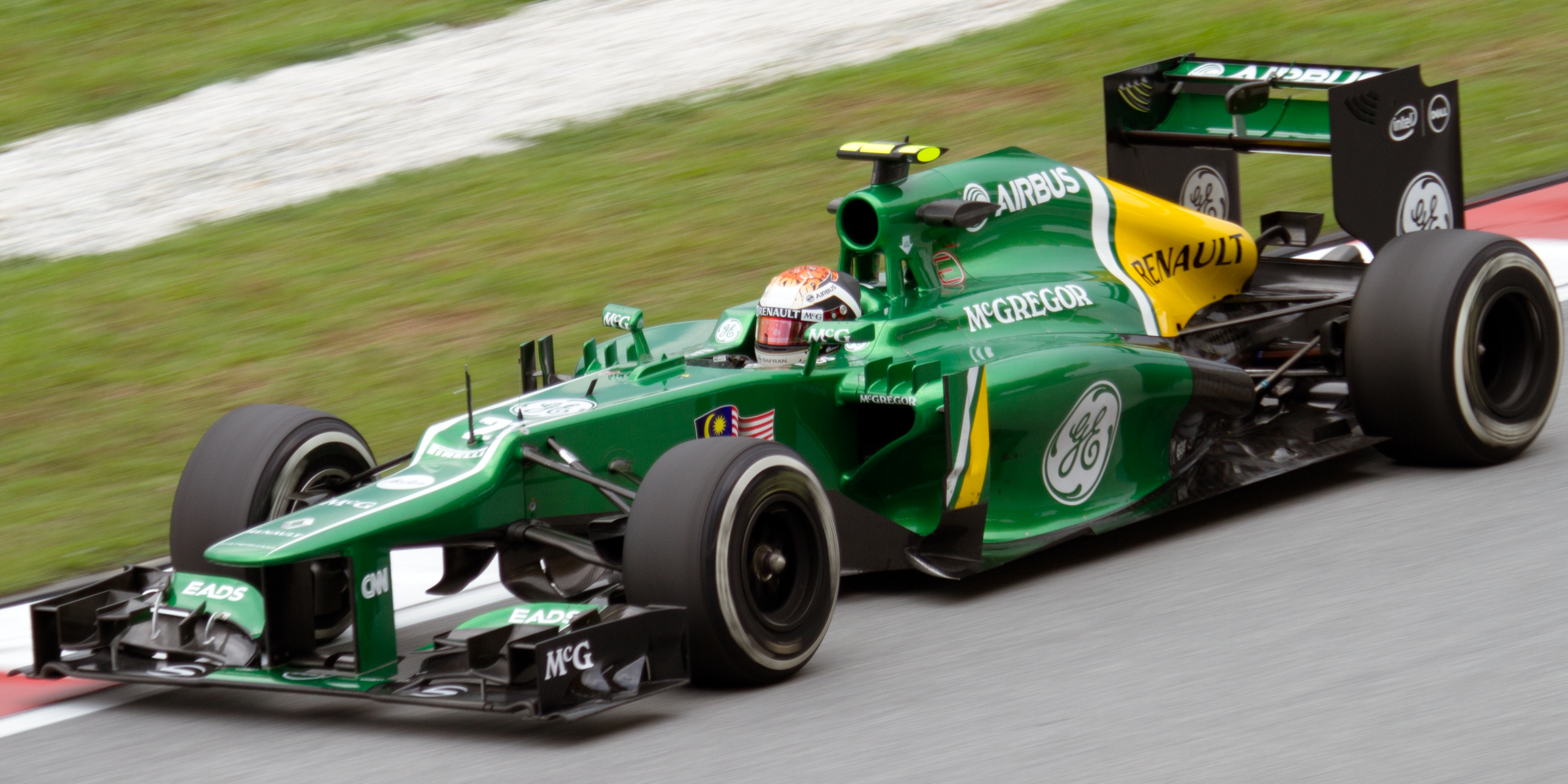
Giedo van der Garde driving the CT03 at the 2013 Malaysian Grand Prix.

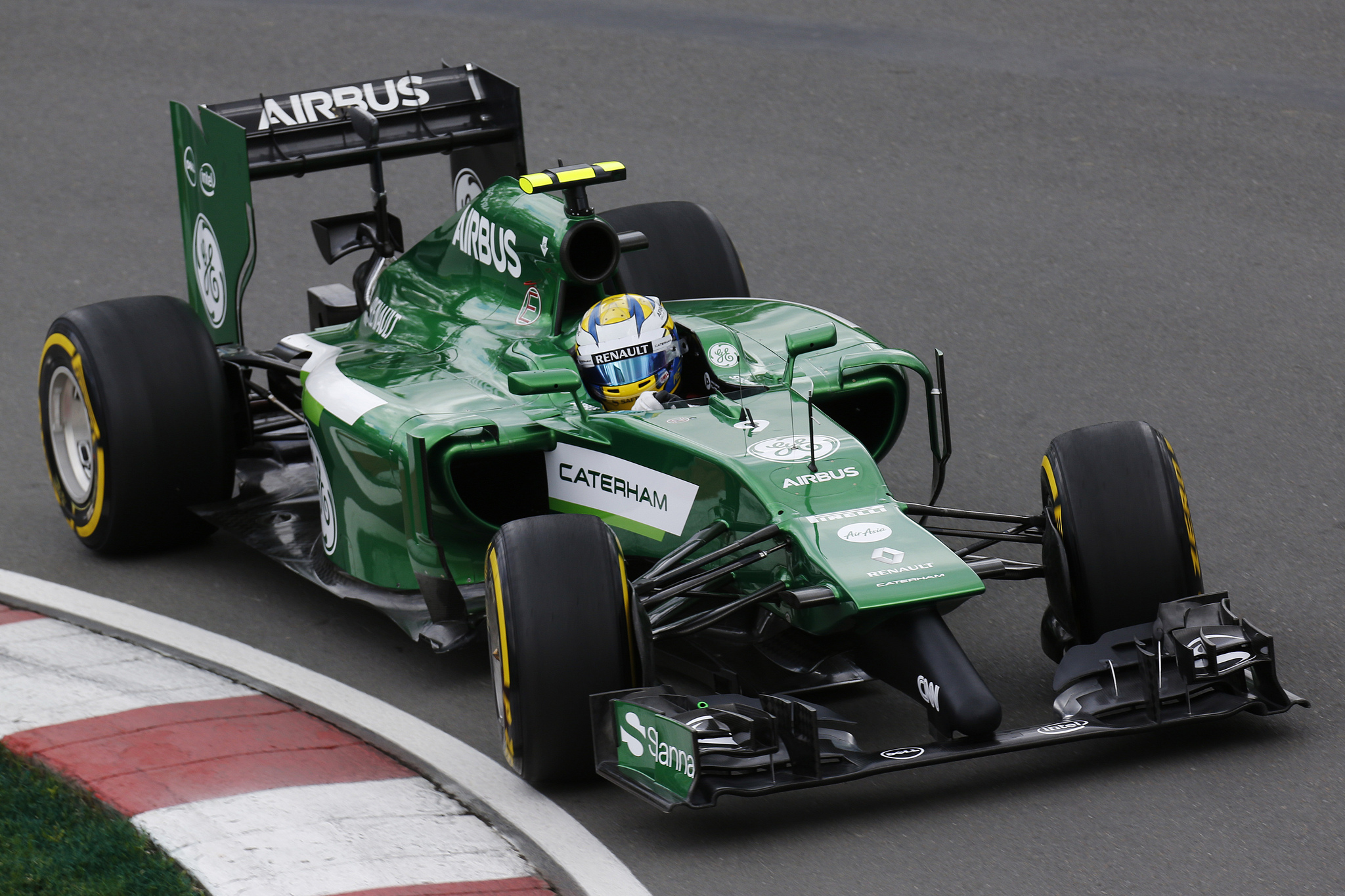
Marcus Ericsson driving the CT05 at the 2014 Malaysian Grand Prix.

== Coloni ==
In its first years, Coloni was sponsored by Himont and Montefluos, two subsidiary companies of Montedison

Year	Main colour(s)	Additional colour(s)	Main sponsor(s)	Additional major sponsor(s)	Notes
1987	Yellow	None	Renzacci, Cast, Himont	White Sun, Q8, Bosby	
1988	Yellow		Himont	Magnabosco, Lpr	
1989	Yellow	Blue, Green	Himont, Magnabosco, Malizia, Montefluos	Lpr, Bimo, La Cinq, Scaini, Cappello	Used in one car
1989	White	Sky Blue, Yellow, Black	Himont, La Cinq, Malizia, Agip	Lpr, Bimo, Pirelli, Magnabosco, Scaini	
1990 (with Subaru power)	White	Red, Green		Subaru, Agip, Capa	Subaru Coloni racing livery
1990 (without Subaru power)	Yellow			Agip, Capa, Goodyear, Magneti Marelli	
1991	White	Blue, Gray		Galp	

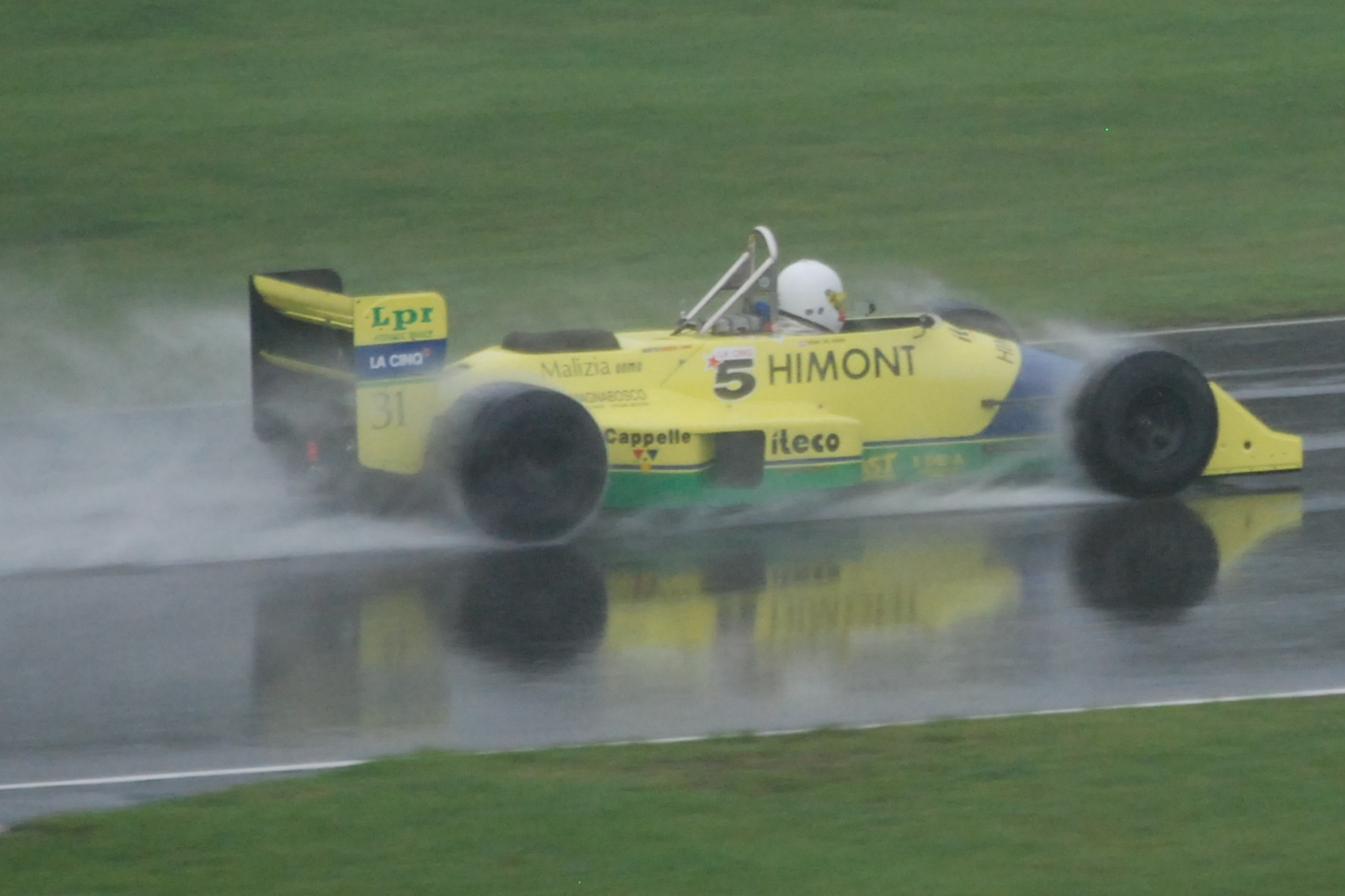
1988 Coloni FC188B being demonstrated at Donington Park in 2009.

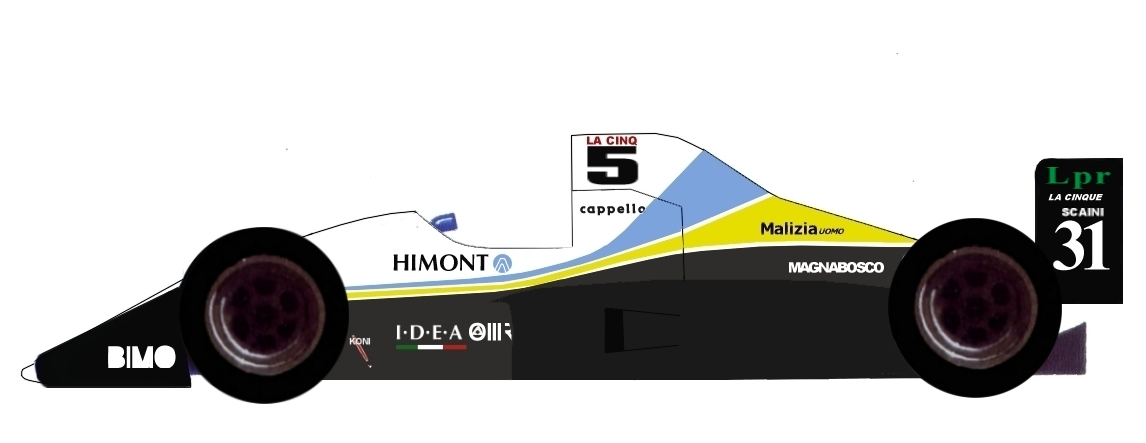
1989 Coloni C3

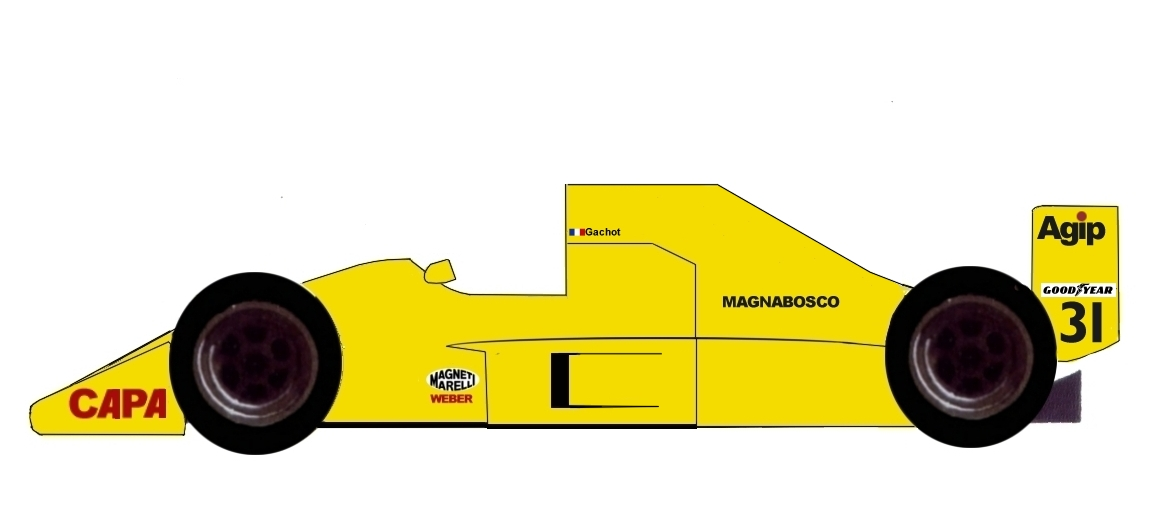
1990 Coloni C3C with Ford power

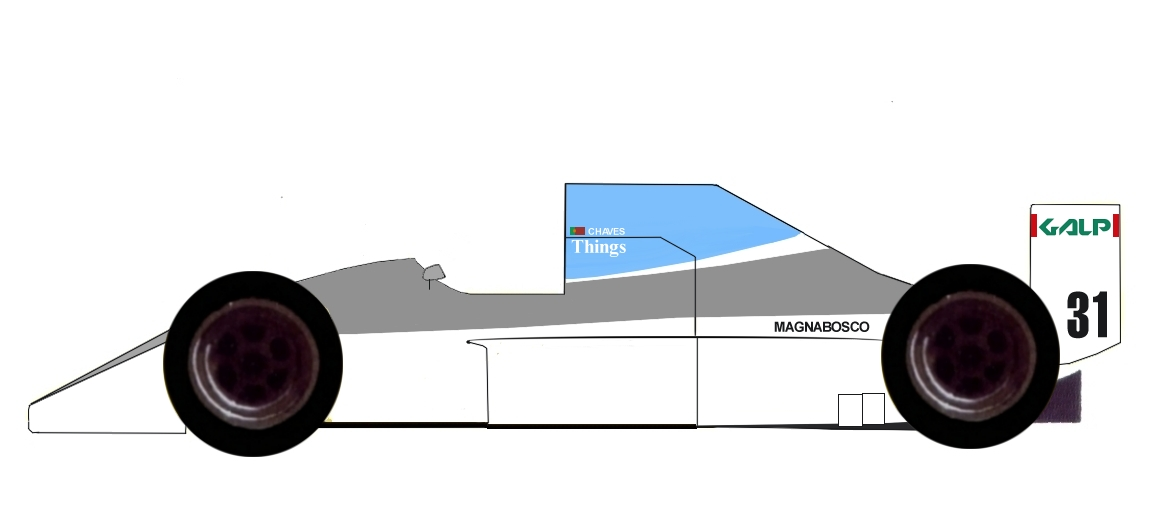
1991 Coloni C4

== Cooper ==
The Cooper works team always raced with the British racing green, initially with yellow as secondary color, until 1955, which was when it was replaced by white in different designs, such as a white stripe around the front air intake in 1955 and the later parallel stripes design similar to the ones seen on the Mini production cars.

Year	Main colour(s)	Additional colour(s)	Main sponsor(s)	Additional major sponsor(s)	Notes
1950–1954	British racing green	Yellow			
1955–1969	British racing green	White			

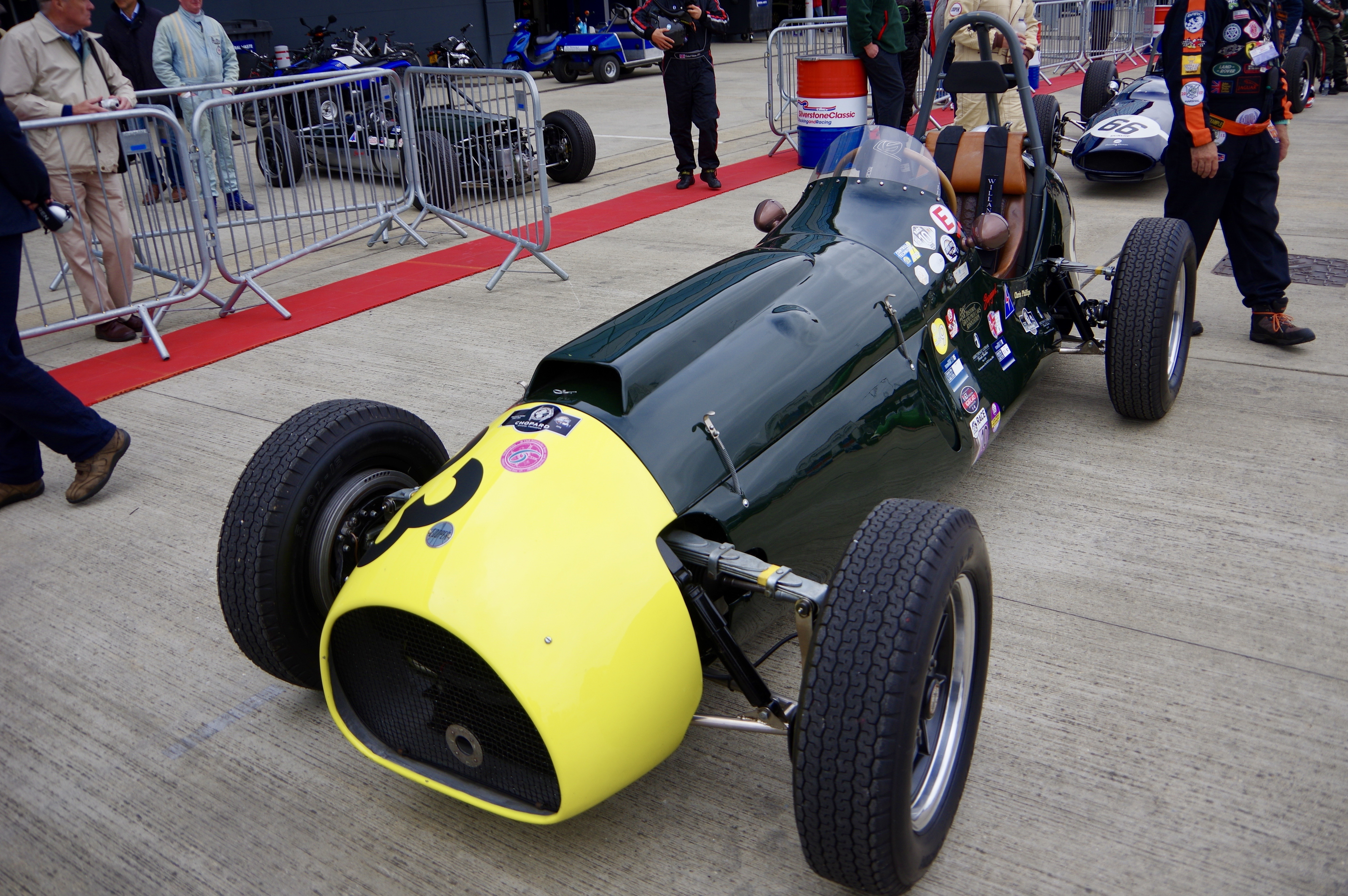
A 1953 Cooper T23 in its green and yellow livery

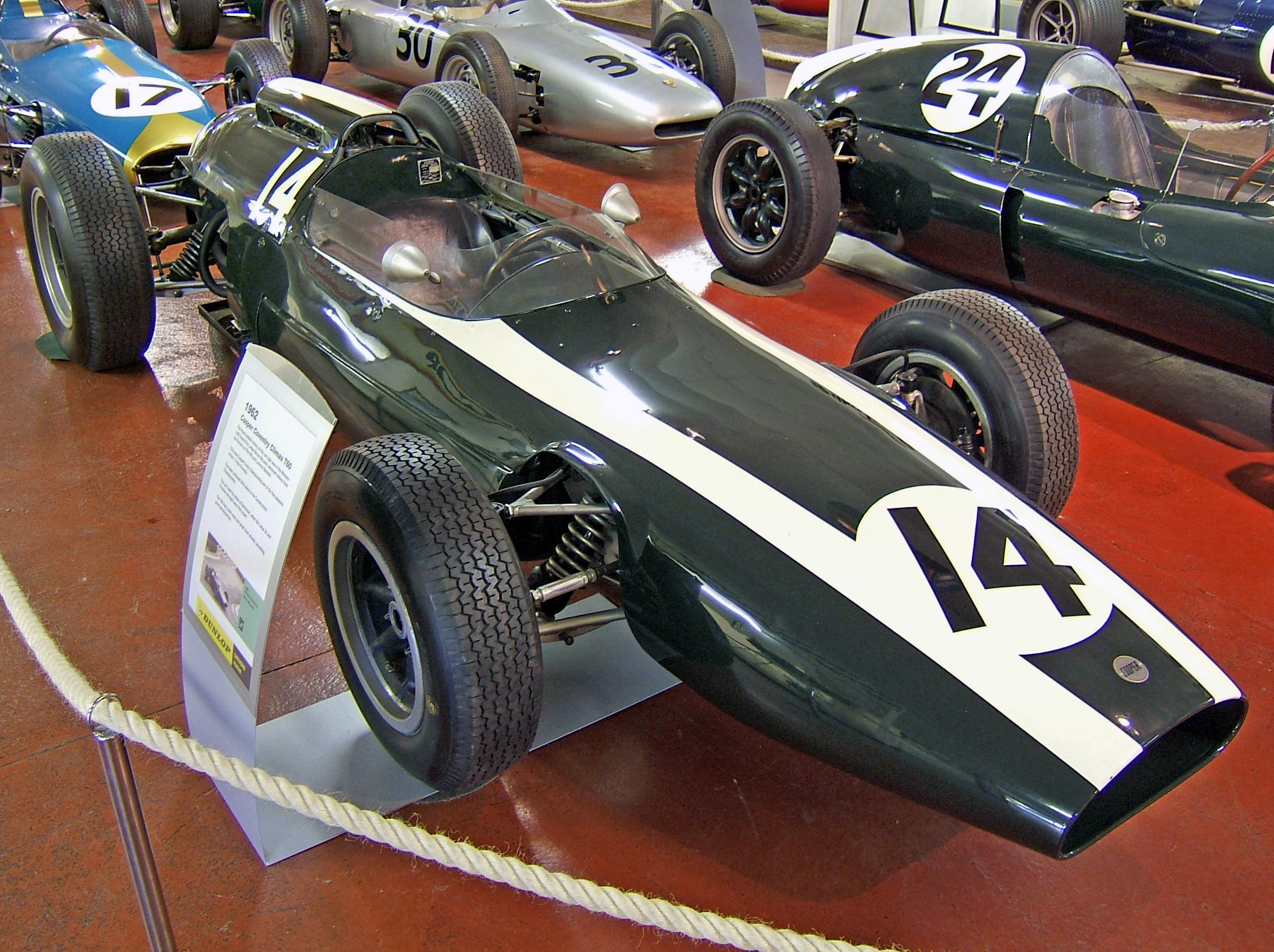
A 1962 Cooper T60 with its iconic green with white parallel stripes running along the body

== Ensign ==
Year	Driver(s)	Main colour(s)	Main sponsor(s)	Additional major sponsor(s)
1973	Rikky von Opel	Green		Duckhams
1974	Rikky von Opel	Green		
1974	Vern Schuppan	Orange	Theodore Racing Hong Kong	Armstrong, Duckhams
1974	Mike Wilds	Green	Dempster International	Shell
1975	Roelof Wunderink; Gijs van Lennep; Chris Amon	White	HB Alarmsystemen	Motormeyer
1976	Chris Amon; Patrick Nève; Hans Binder; Jacky Ickx	Black	Valvoline; John Day Model Cars (South African Grand Prix and United States Grand Prix West only); Norris Industries (United States Grand Prix West and United States Grand Prix only); F&S Properties (Monaco Grand Prix, Swedish Grand Prix and German Grand Prix only); First National City Travelers Checks (British Grand Prix only)	Texaco (French Grand Prix only); Alpquell Natürliches Mineralwasser, Elan, Raiffeisen (Austrian Grand Prix only)
1977	Clay Regazzoni; Jacky Ickx	Black	Tissot, Castrol	Clay Regazzoni Jeans; Cynar (Argentine Grand Prix and Brazilian Grand Prix only); Theodore Racing Hong Kong (Long Beach Grand Prix only)
1977	Patrick Tambay	White	Theodore Racing Hong Kong	Elf
1978	Danny Ongais	Black	Tissot	Interscope Racing
1978	Danny Ongais	Black	Tissot	FINA; ARCO Graphite (Long Beach Grand Prix only); Marlboro (Belgian Grand Prix only); Mopar, Hi-Line Car Stripes (British Grand Prix only); ICI Chemicals, Heyco Werkzeuge (Dutch Grand Prix only); Guinness (Italian Grand Prix only); TWA (Canadian Grand Prix only); Valvoline (United States Grand Prix and Canadian Grand Prix only)
1978	Jacky Ickx; Derek Daly; Nelson Piquet; Bernard de Dryver; Brett Lunger	Black	Tissot	FINA; ARCO Graphite (Long Beach Grand Prix only); Marlboro (Belgian Grand Prix only); Mopar, Hi-Line Car Stripes (British Grand Prix only); ICI Chemicals, Heyco Werkzeuge (Dutch Grand Prix only); Guinness (Italian Grand Prix only); TWA (Canadian Grand Prix only); Valvoline (United States Grand Prix and Canadian Grand Prix only)
1978	Geoff Lees	Red	Tissot	Hi-Line Car Stripes, Mario Deliotti Racing, Radio Luxembourg
1978	Lamberto Leoni	Black; White	Tissot	
1978	Lamberto Leoni	Black; White		Benning
1978	Harald Ertl	Black	Heyco Werkzeuge	Sachs Sporting, Shell
1979	Derek Daly; Patrick Gaillard; Marc Surer	Black; Red	Theodore Racing Hong Kong; Rainbow Jeanswear (Canadian Grand Prix and United States Grand Prix only); Hi-Line Car Stripes (British Grand Prix only) Elf (Austrian Grand Prix and Dutch Grand Prix only); Valvoline	
1980	Clay Regazzoni; Tiff Needell; Jan Lammers; Geoff Lees	Blue, White and Red	Unipart	GoodyearTheodore (Italian Grand Prix onwards)
1981	Marc Surer; Ricardo Londoño-Bridge	Blue, White and Red	ISM Group of Companies, Valvoline	Champagne Abel Lepitre, Doria, Lucas Oil, Michelin
1981	Eliseo Salazar	Blue, White and Red	Din, Toyota; Budweiser (Caesars Palace Grand Prix only)	Esso, Lucas Oil, Michelin, Tecfin, Valvoline
1982	Roberto Guerrero	White; Dark Blue and White	Café de Colombia, Caribu	Michelin, Valvoline

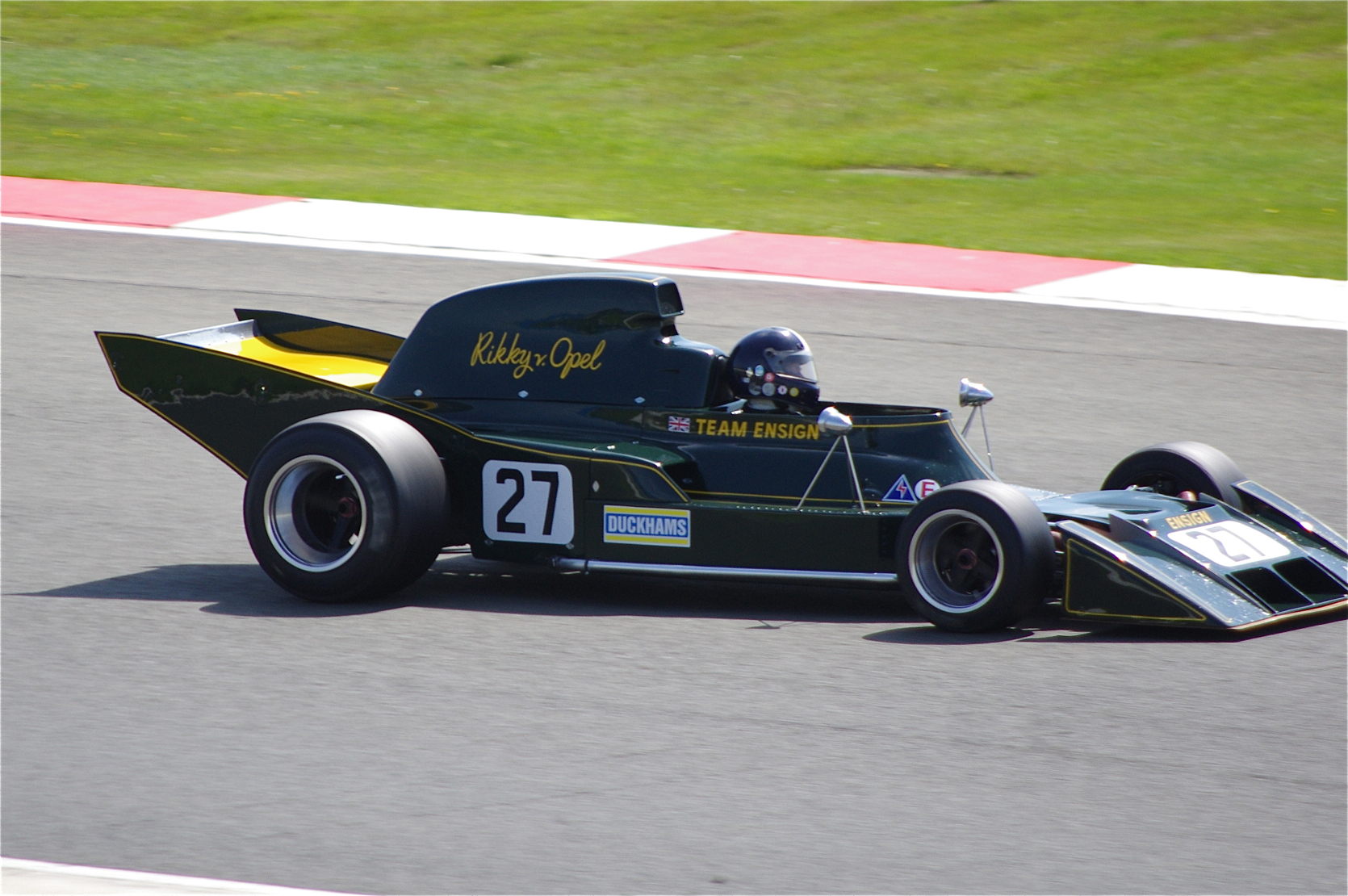
Rikky von Opel's Ensign N173 driven at Silverstone Classic 2012

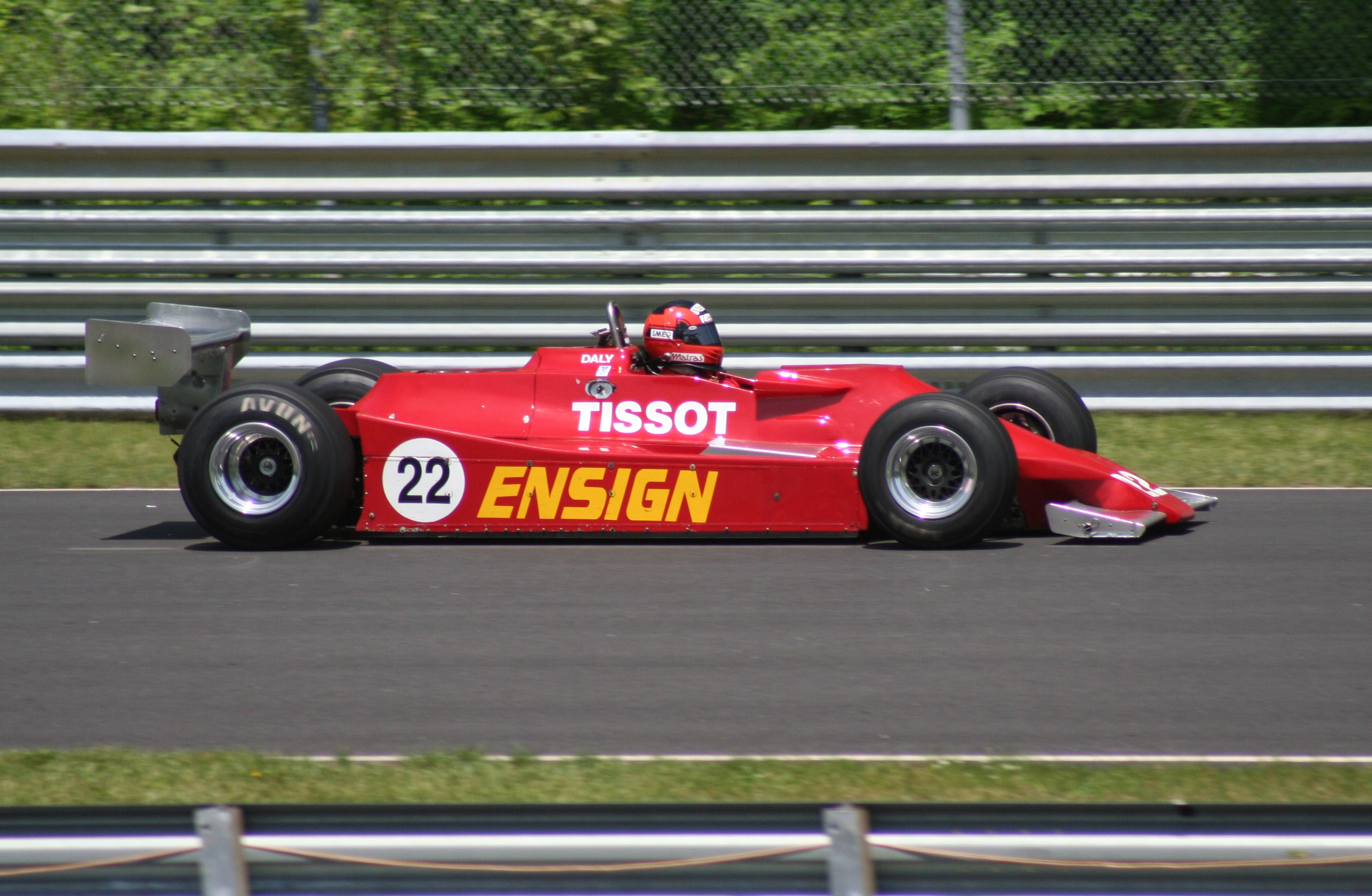
An ex-Derek Daly Ensign N177 being raced in a Historic Grand Prix at Lime Rock Park in May 2009.

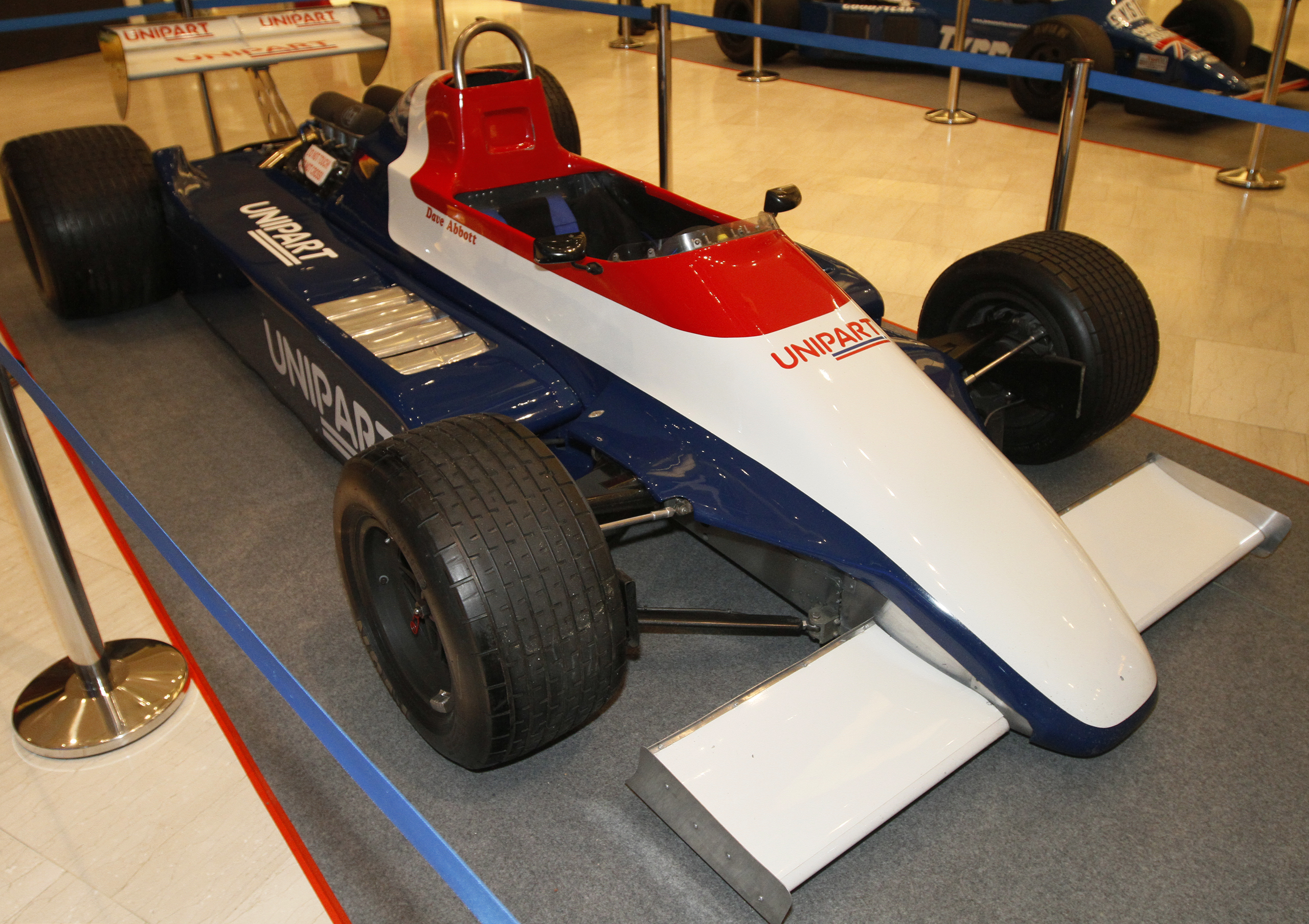
An Ensign N180 in its Unipart Livery

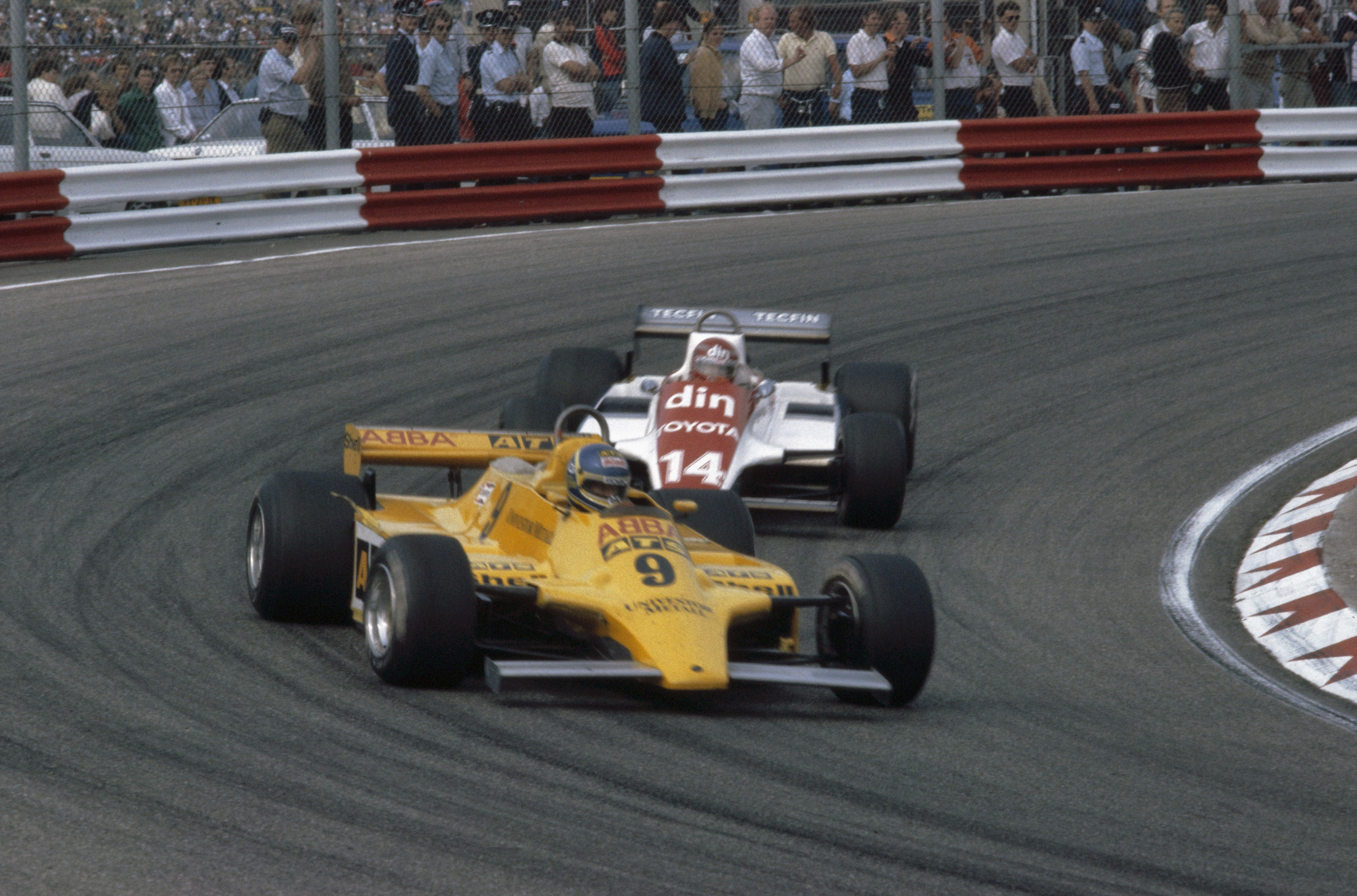
Eliseo Salazar driving for Ensign at the 1981 Dutch Grand Prix

== Eifelland ==
Year	Main colour(s)	Additional colour(s)	Main sponsor(s)	Additional major sponsor(s)	Notes
1972	Blue	White (Some versions had the Yellow Spoiler)	Eifelland Caravan	Goodyear, Shell, Ford, Bostik	
1972 (later races)	White		Eifelland Caravan	Goodyear, Shell, Ford, Bostik	

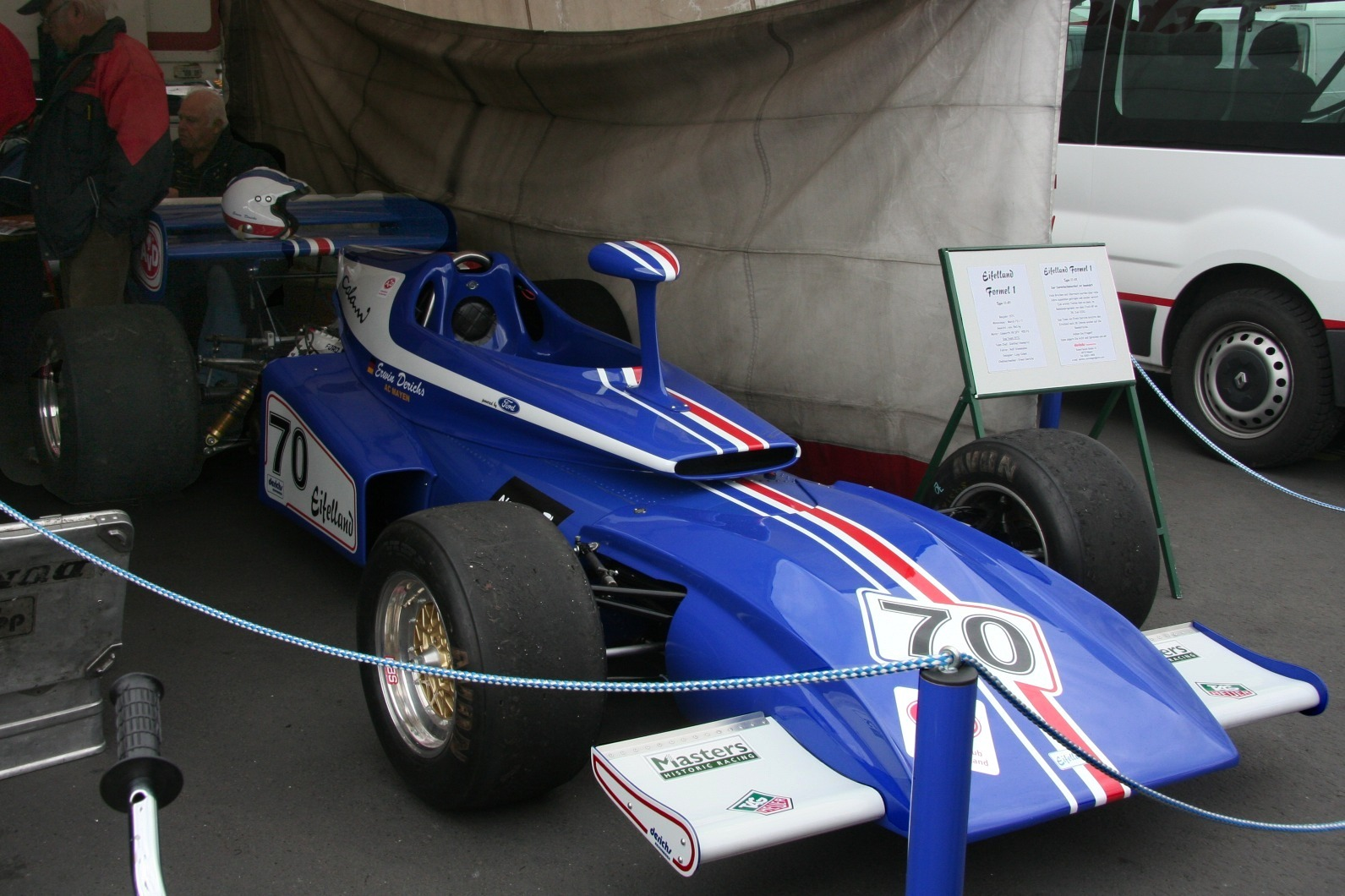
Eifelland-March E21 from 1972, pictured in 2011

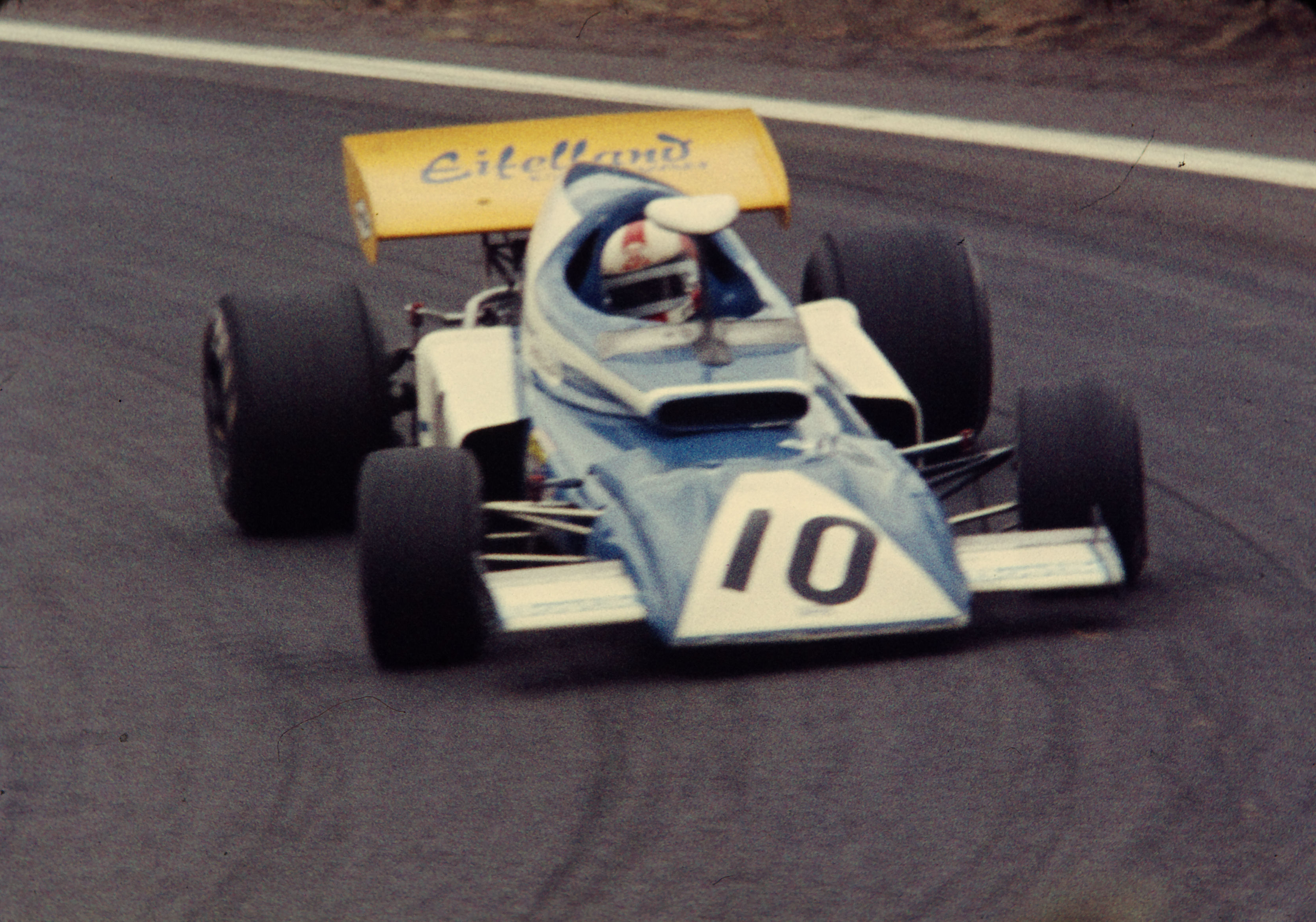
The Eifelland E21 (white accent, yellow spoiler variation) driven at the 1972 French Grand Prix

== EuroBrun ==
Year	Main colour(s)	Additional colour(s)	Main sponsor(s)	Additional major sponsor(s)	Notes
1988	White, Yellow (with M505 as sponsor)	Black	Tommasini/M505	Marlboro, OZ Wheels, Goodyear, Darwin, Fondmetal	
1989	White	Red, Green, Black	JSK	Lista	1 car
1989	Orange	Black	Jägermeister	Lista, OZ Wheels, Agip, Rafta	Foitek's car
1990	Silver	Black	JSK, IS-ME-DIN, Agip, OIIR	LFIP, Rafta, mara, Bburago, LPR, Zucchini	Used in 1 car

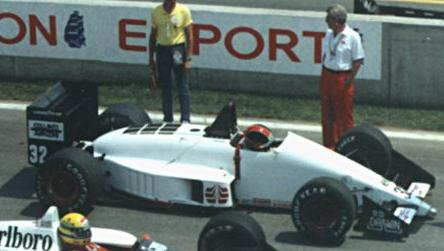
Oscar Larrauri at the 1988 Canadian Grand Prix

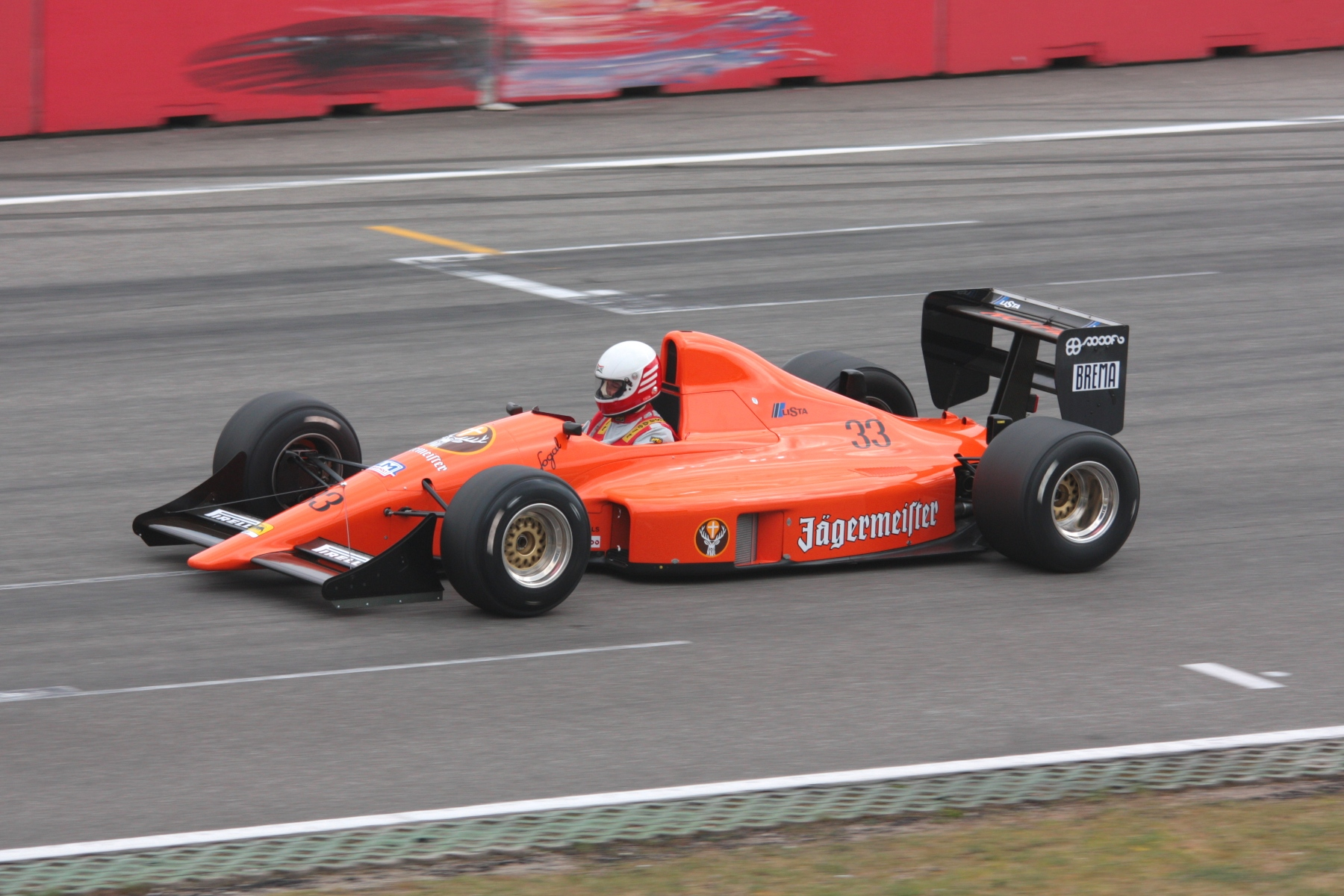
Gregor Foitek's 1989 Eurobrun being demonstrated at historic event at Hockenheim

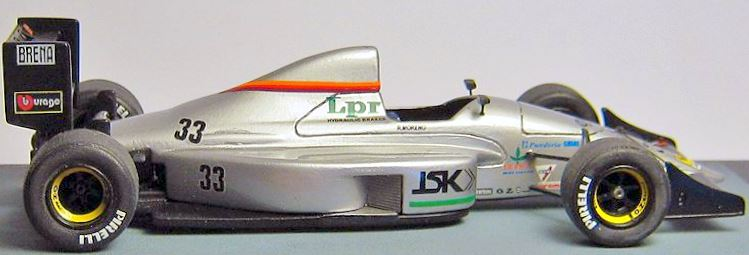
A Eurobrun 189B from the 1990 season

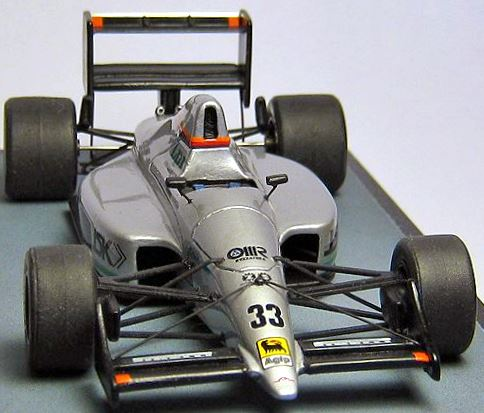
The Eurobrun 189B from 1990 season, Eurobrun's last season

== Ferrari ==
In keeping with their Italian roots, the Ferrari works team has always kept a red colour in the tradition of rosso corsa, the national racing colour of Italy, except for last two races in the 1964 season (the 1964 United States Grand Prix and 1964 Mexican Grand Prix) when Enzo Ferrari let his cars be entered by the NART team in American national racing colours (white with blue lengthwise "Cunningham racing stripes") to protest against Italian racing authorities. However, Ferrari cars entered by non-Italian privateer teams wore their respective national racing colours until the 1961 Belgian Grand Prix when Belgian driver Olivier Gendebien privately entered a Ferrari car in the Belgian racing yellow colour. Since Ferrari cars entered in 1965 and 1969 seasons by the NART team and at the 1966 Italian Grand Prix by the British privateer team Reg Parnell kept wearing the red colour, the 1964 Mexican Grand Prix was the last time Ferrari cars wore other than the traditional red colour in Formula One.

Over the years, rosso corsa has been combined with white parts and with various sponsorship schemes, but Ferrari has never fully let their cars be dominated by the sponsorship livery like many other teams have. This changed in the 1990s when Ferrari replaced their traditional rosso corsa colour with a "Marlboro red" which is noticeably lighter; this colour remains despite the ban on tobacco sponsorship. Ferrari had Marlboro as the team's title sponsor (renamed as Scuderia Ferrari Marlboro) from 1997 until the 2011 European Grand Prix and as one of team's main sponsors from 1993 to 2017 (Marlboro had first been seen on Ferrari F1 cars in 1984 largely due to then driver Michele Alboreto's personal sponsorship with the brand). Philip Morris continued to sponsor Ferrari as Mission Winnow in 2018 (renamed as Scuderia Ferrari Mission Winnow). Ferrari reverted to its rosso corsa colors in 2022 after Philip Morris lost its livery sponsorship rights.

Year	Main colour(s)	Additional colour(s)	Main sponsor(s)	Additional major sponsor(s)	Non-tobacco/alcohol livery changes
1950–1967	Red, Blue (1964 United States and Mexican Grands Prix)				For the 1964 US GP and Mexico GP, the livery is coloured blue.
1968–1994	Red	White or Black, Green (1970s)	Marlboro (1993–1994)	Shell (1968–1972), Agip (1973–1994), FIAT (1976–1994), Goodyear, Pioneer (1993–1994), Marlboro (1984–1992), Longines (1980–1986, 1988–1989), Magneti Marelli, Champion, Weber, Gould, Agip, SKF, Arexons	Marlboro logo removed completely or replaced with white space (2000–2004) (The Ferrari cars had white spaces over Marlboro occasionally in 1998 and 1999) (same for Ducati MotoGP team from 2003 to 2004), Marlboro logo changed to "bar code" (1994–1999, 2005–2006), or text removed with keeping the chevron with the driver's name (1993) and in the team member clothing, Marlboro logo became a white square with a red stripe above with written the driver's name (1980s–1996). In the 1999 Belgian Grand Prix, Marlboro was replaced by "Ferrari Formula One". The team used special livery for 2001 Italian Grand Prix in remembrance of the 11 September 2001 attacks in the United States; both cars ran without any sponsorship livery and sported matte black nose cones. In the 2005 Bahrain Grand Prix the cars sported black nose cones as a sign of mourning for Pope John Paul II.
1995	Red	Black	Marlboro	Agip, Pioneer, FIAT, Goodyear, Telecom Italia	
1996	Red	Black	Marlboro, Shell	Pioneer, Asprey, Goodyear, FIAT, Telecom Italia, GE	
1997	Red		Marlboro, Shell	Pioneer, Asprey, Goodyear, FIAT, GE, Magneti Marelli, Telecom Italia	
1998	Red		Marlboro, Shell	Asprey, Goodyear, FIAT, GE, Magneti Marelli, Telecom Italia, Tommy Hilfiger	
1999–2001	Red		Marlboro, Shell	TIM, FedEx, Tic Tac, Bridgestone, Magneti Marelli, GE, FIAT, Tommy Hilfiger	
2002	Red	White	Marlboro	Vodafone, Shell, Bridgestone, FIAT, AMD, SK Telecom	
2003–2006	Red	White	Marlboro	Vodafone, Shell, Bridgestone, FIAT, Martini (2006), AMD, Olympus (2003–2005), Acer	
2007–2009	Red	White	Marlboro	Shell, Bridgestone, FIAT, AMD, Acer, Alice, Martini (2007–2008), Etihad (2008-), Mubadala (2008–2009)	Due to a total tobacco livery ban, from 2008 onwards only a "bar code" has been used instead of the Marlboro logo. As of the 2010 Spanish Grand Prix, even the "bar code" was removed on allegations of subliminal tobacco advertising. This was replaced in 2011 with a new 'Scuderia Ferrari' logo, which uses a similar graphical design to the Marlboro logo while purporting to be a team logo and is placed in the main areas the previous barcode was visible. Philip Morris's sponsorship deal with Ferrari has been extended to 2015. In May 2015, another deal between The Philip Morris Group and Ferrari took place, extending the sponsor deal until 2018, and in August 2017 another "multi-year" deal was signed.
2010	Red	White and Black	Marlboro, Santander	Shell, Bridgestone, FIAT, AMD, Acer, Etihad, Mubadala	
2011–2012	Red	White	Santander	Shell, Kaspersky Lab, Pirelli, TATA, FIAT, Acer, AMD	
2011–2012	Red	White	Santander	Shell, Kaspersky Lab, Pirelli, FIAT, acer, AMD, Ferrari World	
2013	Red	White, Black	Santander	Shell, UPS, Kaspersky Lab, Pirelli, FIAT, Acer, AMD, Ferrari World, TNT Energy Drink, OMR Automotive, MAHLE, HUBLOT	
2014	Red, Black	White	Santander	Shell, UPS, FIAT, HUBLOT, Kaspersky Lab, Pirelli, WEICHAI, Ferrari World, TNT Energy Drink, OMR Automotive, MAHLE	
2015	Red	Black, White	Santander	Shell, Alfa Romeo, UPS, HUBLOT, Kaspersky Lab, Pirelli, WEICHAI, Ferrari World, TNT Energy Drink, Telcel, Claro, Haas, Puma, MAHLE, Oakley, OMR Automotive, SKF, Brembo, Magneti Marelli, Iveco	
2016	Red, White	Black	Santander	Shell, Alfa Romeo, UPS, HUBLOT, Kaspersky Lab, Pirelli, WEICHAI, Ferrari World, TNT Energy Drink, Telcel, Claro, MAHLE, Oakley, OMR Automotive, SKF, Brembo, Magneti Marelli, Singha, Infor, XCDS, Ray-Ban, Option Rally	
2017	Red	White, Black	Santander	Shell, Alfa Romeo, UPS, HUBLOT, Kaspersky Lab, Pirelli, WEICHAI, Ferrari World, MAHLE, OMR Automotive, SKF, Brembo, Magneti Marelli, Singha, Infor, Swisse, Ray-Ban, Option Rally, NGK	
2018	Red	Grey, white, green, red	Mission Winnow (2018 Japanese Grand Prix onwards)	Shell, Ray-Ban, Alfa Romeo, Kaspersky Lab, UPS, Lenovo, WEICHAI, HUBLOT, MAHLE, OMR Automotive, AMD, Singha, Pirelli, Puma, Swisse, Infor, Experis, SKF, Magneti Marelli, Brembo, Riedel, Iveco, Bell, O.Z, Honeywell, Veuve Clicquot	Ferrari's 2018 livery also contains the colours of the Italian flag. Ferrari and Philip Morris unveiled the Mission Winnow livery in the 2018 Japanese Grand Prix. Mission Winnow was also the title sponsor for the 2019 and 2021 seasons, competing as Scuderia Ferrari Mission Winnow. The Mission Winnow logos were removed in the 2019 Australian Grand Prix and were replaced with Scuderia Ferrari's 90th Anniversary logo from the Canadian to Russian Grands Prix. In 2020, the Mission Winnow logos appeared during the testing sessions but were absent throughout the season. Mission Winnow lost the title and livery sponsorship rights in 2022 but remained as a partner. For the 2020 Tuscan Grand Prix, the 1,000th Grand Prix entry for the team, the car was painted into a darker red with a different number font and "1000GP" logo.
2019	Red	Black	Mission Winnow (2018 Japanese Grand Prix onwards)	Shell, Ray-Ban, Kaspersky Lab, UPS, Lenovo, WEICHAI, HUBLOT, MAHLE, OMR Automotive, AMD, Pirelli, Infor, Experis, SKF, Magneti Marelli, Brembo, Laszmoe	
2020	Red	Black		Shell, Ray-Ban, Kaspersky Lab, UPS, HUBLOT, MAHLE, OMR Automotive, Pirelli, Infor, Experis, SKF, Brembo, Magneti Marelli, NGK, Palantir, VistaJet	
2021	Red	Burgundy, Black	Mission Winnow	Shell, Ray-Ban, Kaspersky Lab, UPS, WEICHAI, HUBLOT, OMR Automotive, Estrella Galicia, Richard Mille, Pirelli, Experis, SKF, Brembo, Magneti Marelli, NGK, Palantir, VistaJet, Radiobook, Riva	
2022–2023	Dark Red (2022), Red (2023)	Black		Snapdragon (2022), Ray-Ban, AWS, CEVA Logistics, Estrella Galicia, Palantir, OMR Automotive, Pirelli, SKF, Brembo, NGK, VistaJet, MAHLE, Radiobook (2022), Riva, Velas (2022), Santander, Frecciarossa (2022), Shell, Bitdefender, Richard Mille, Genesys (2023), HCL Software (2023), Harman Kardon (2023), Ecopol (2023), Bang & Olufsen (2023), VGW (2023), DXC Technology (2023)	In countries where alcohol sponsorship is outlawed, the Peroni logo, which appears from 2024 onward, is replaced with alternatives: as of 2025, the replacements are references to their Italian heritage. The HP logo was added to the livery from the 2024 Miami Grand Prix onward. From the Miami Grand Prix from 2024 to 2025, Ferrari ran HP collaborative blue liveries. The first marked the 70th anniversary of Ferrari's presence in North America which features two historic shades of blue – Azzurro La Plata and Azzurro Dino. Since 2022, Ferrari has run special liveries for Monza: 2022 celebrating the 100th anniversary of the Monza Circuit, 2023 celebrating their victory at the 24 Hours of Le Mans, 2025 to celebrate Niki Lauda's championship-winning Ferrari 312T, and 2026 for Michael Schumacher's successes. The 2024 Monza livery changed only the numbers to carbon fibre. A Ferrari retired from the Italian Grand Prix in 2026 running a special livery. During the 2022 Monaco Grand Prix, Ferrari ran a cross-promotion with the Pixar movie Lightyear. For the Las Vegas Grand Prix, Ferrari ran a special "retro" livery in 2023, and a cross-promotion with the movie Gladiator II in 2024. The film's logo was present on the halo for the latter.
2024	Red	Black, Yellow, White	HP	Ray-Ban, AWS, CEVA Logistics, Palantir, OMR Automotive, Pirelli, Riva, Peroni Brewery, Santander, Shell, Richard Mille, Genesys, HCL Software, Puma, Ecopol, Harman Kardon, Bang & Olufsen, VGW, Celsius, DXC Technology, ZCG, SKF, Brembo, NGK, VistaJet, MAHLE	
2025	Dark Red	White, Black, Blue	HP	Ray-Ban, AWS, CEVA Logistics, Palantir, OMR Automotive, Pirelli, Peroni Brewery, Shell, Bitdefender, Richard Mille, Genesys, HCL Software, Puma, Ecopol, Harman Kardon, Bang & Olufsen, VGW, Celsius, DXC Technology, ZCG, SKF, Brembo, NGK, VistaJet, MAHLE, IBM, UniCredit, Vantage, Ambipar	
2026	Red	Black, White, Blue	HP	Ray-Ban, CEVA Logistics, OMR Automotive, Pirelli, Peroni Brewery, Shell, Bitdefender, Richard Mille, Genesys, Puma, DXC Technology, ZCG, IBM, UniCredit, Vantage, Ambipar, ZYN, Bingx, WHOOP, Espacio	

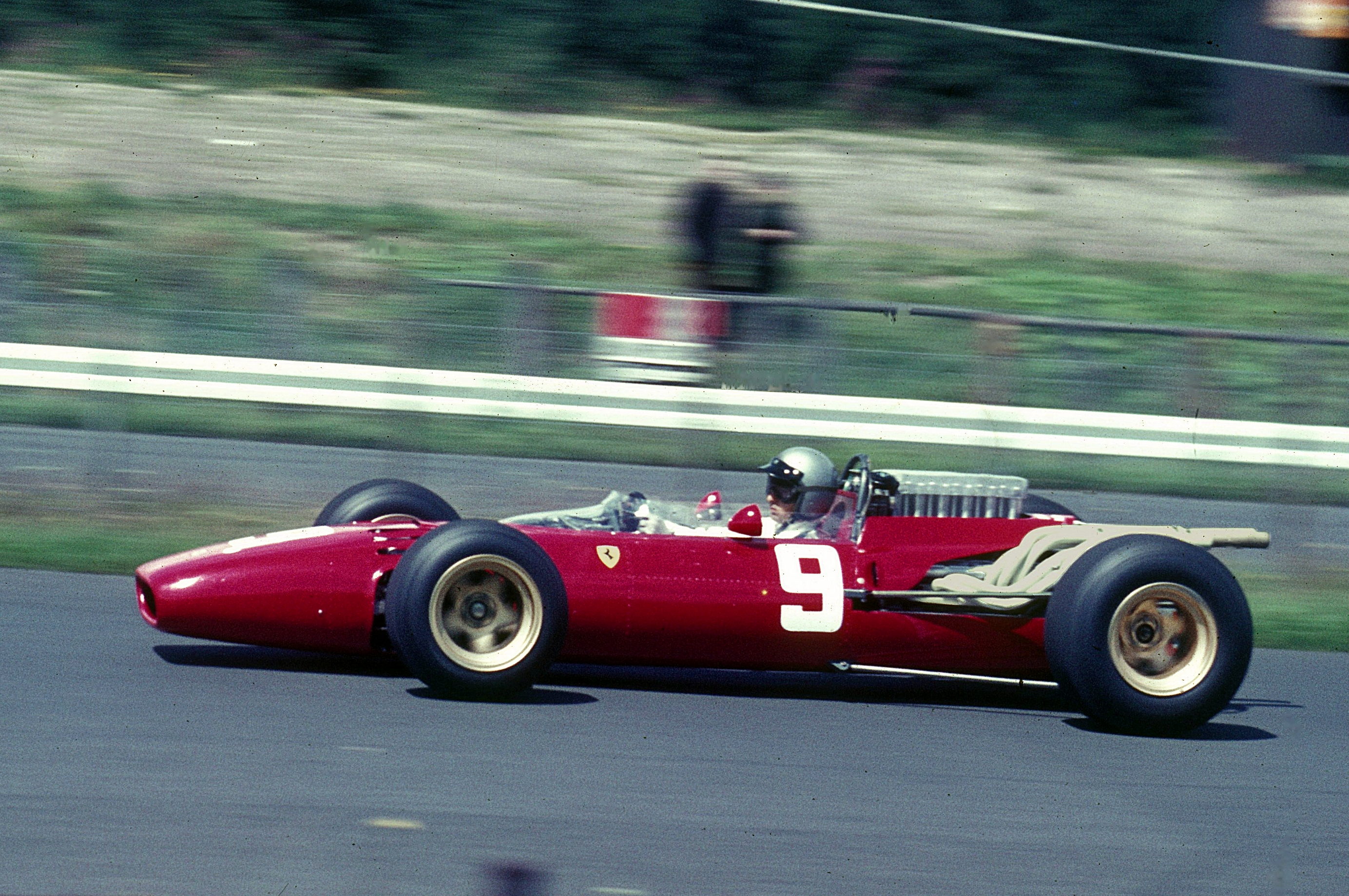
With the exception of the 1964 United States and Mexican Grands Prix, Ferrari has always raced in the Italian national racing colour of rosso corsa. This is Lorenzo Bandini driving the Ferrari 312 at the 1966 German Grand Prix.

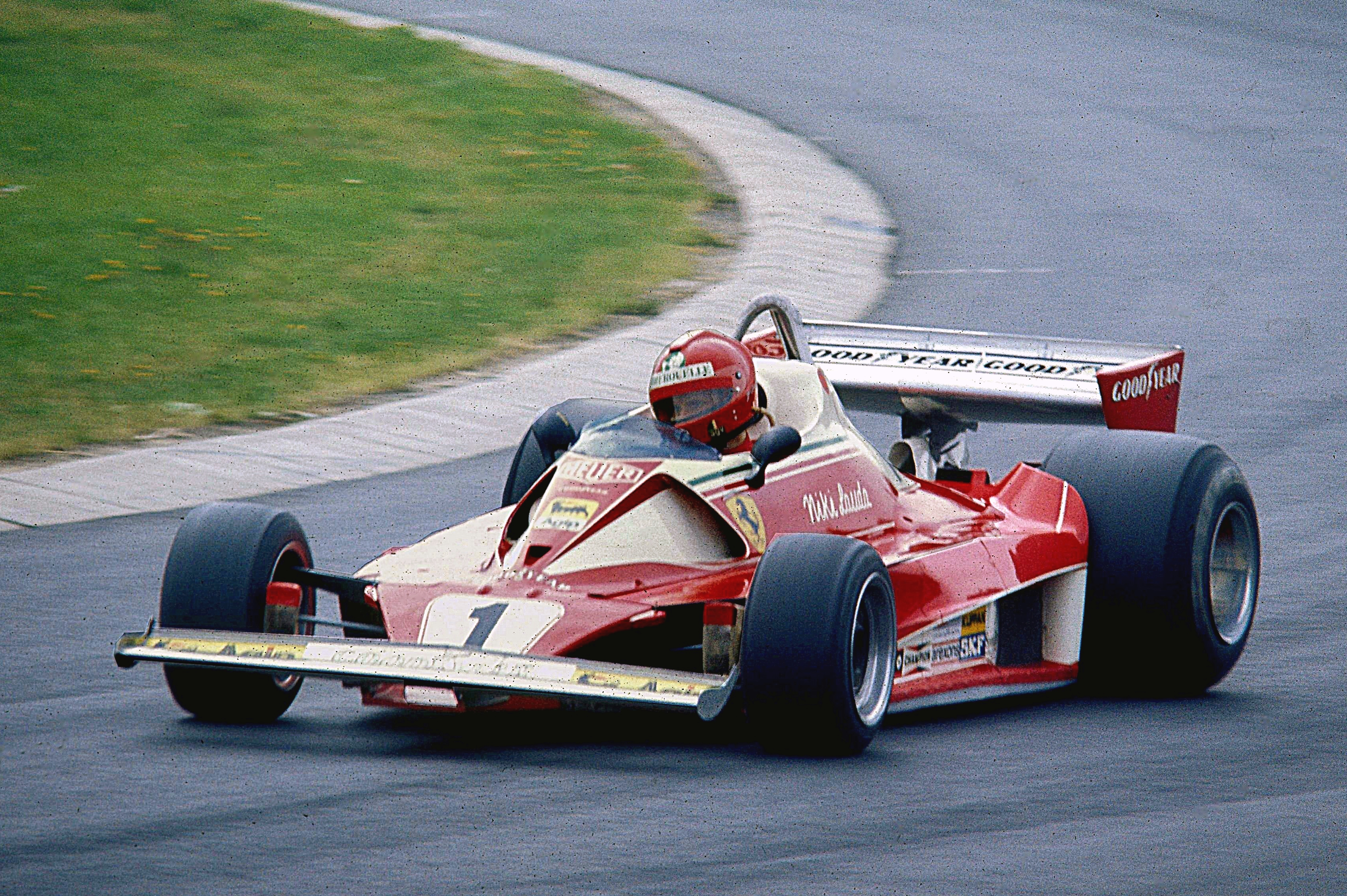
Niki Lauda driving the Ferrari 312T at the 1976 German Grand Prix. By this time, the Ferrari livery included the logos of team suppliers such as Goodyear and Agip.

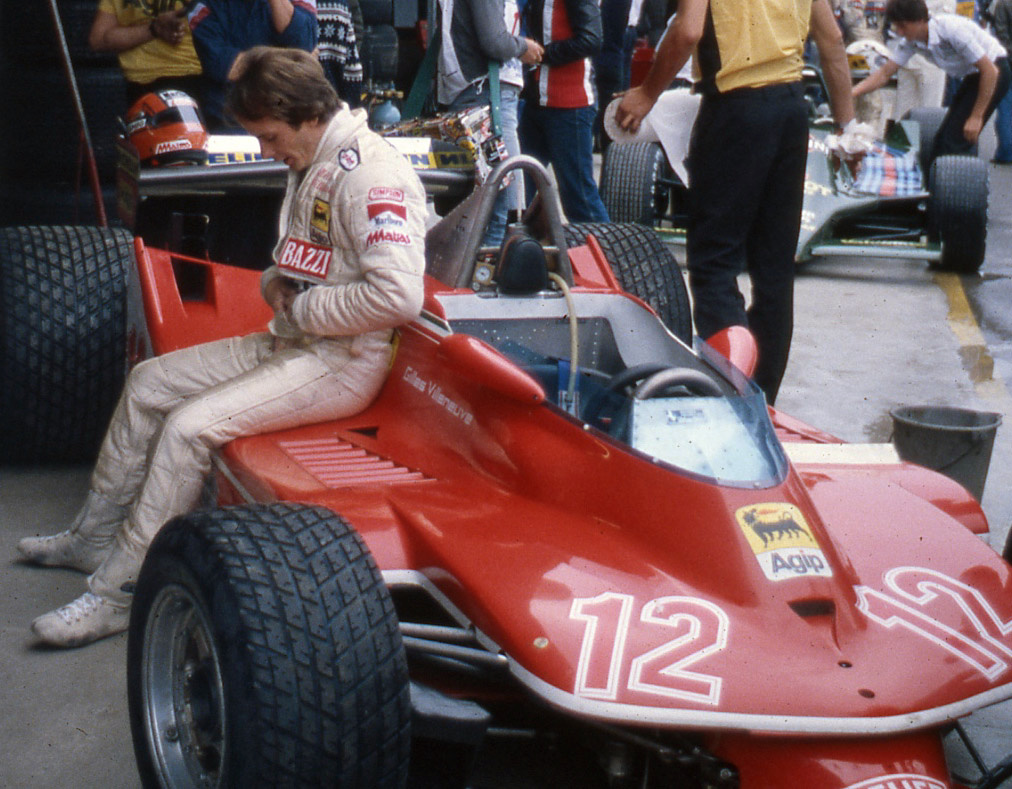
Gilles Villeneuve sitting beside the Ferrari 312T at the 1979 Dino Ferrari Grand Prix. Just like in previous seasons, the Scuderia Ferrari livery included Goodyear and Agip as their sponsors

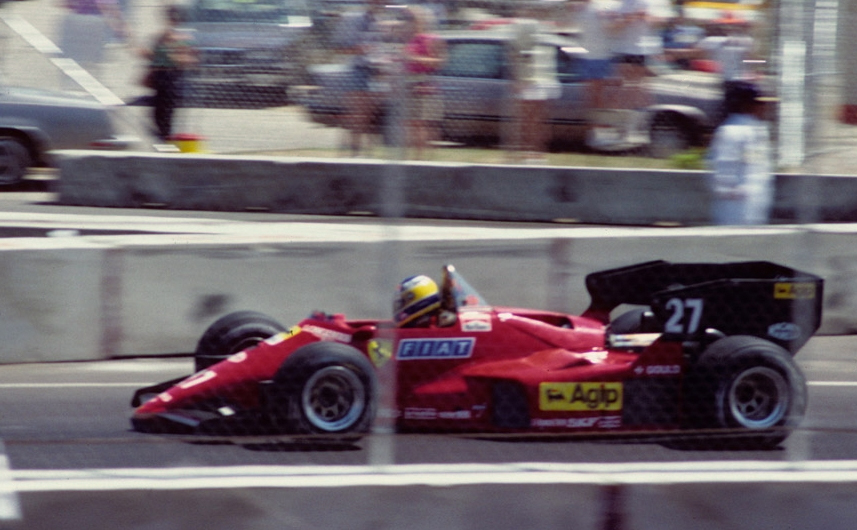
Michele Alboreto racing for Ferrari at the 1984 Dallas GP

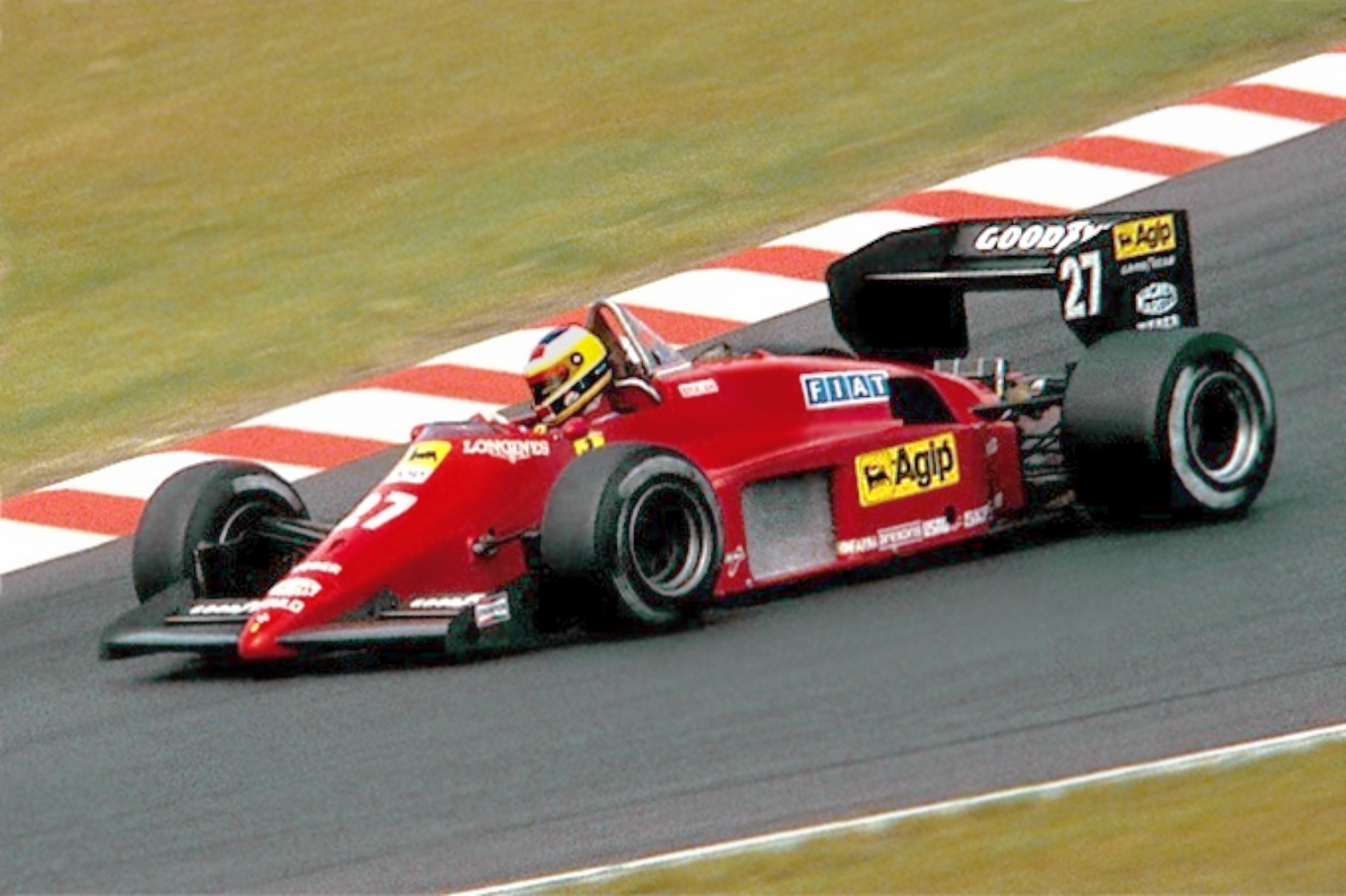
Alboreto racing for Ferrari in 1985

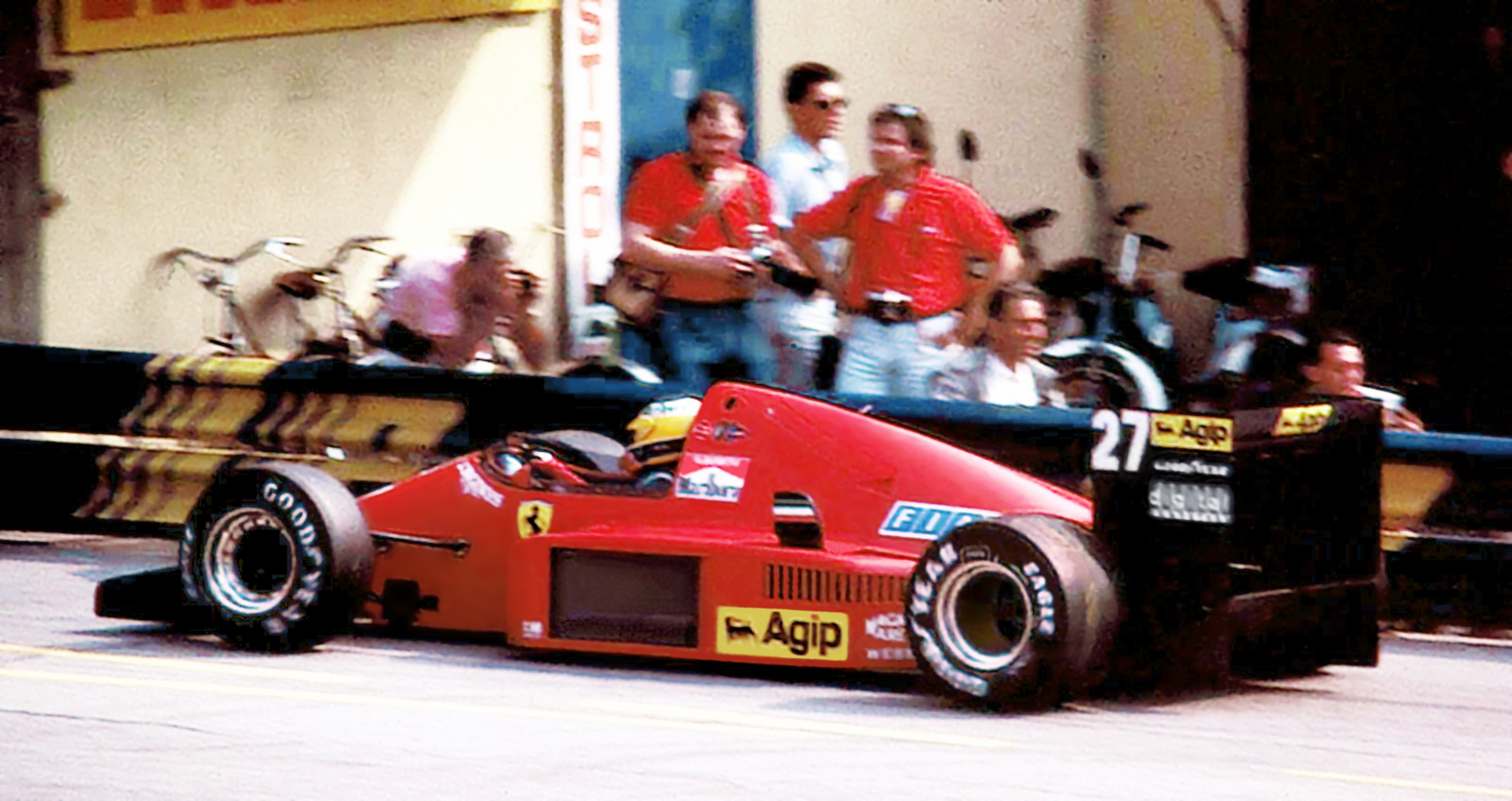
Alboreto racing for Ferrari in 1986

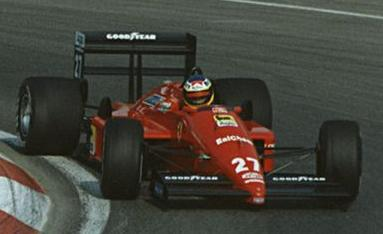
Alboreto racing for Ferrari in 1988

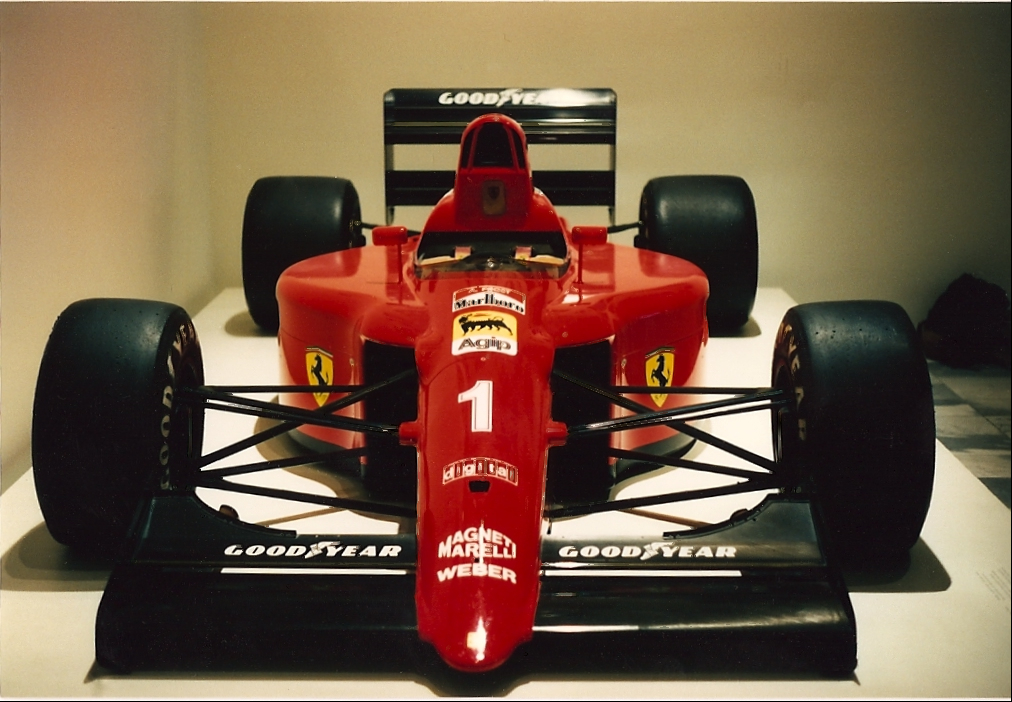
Alain Prost's Ferrari 641 from the 1990 season in display

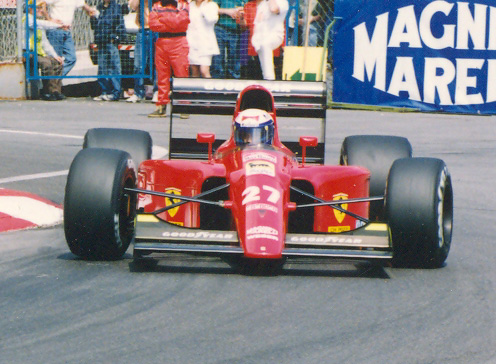
Alain Prost driving the Ferrari 642 at the 1991 Monaco Grand Prix, with a largely unchanged livery from 1976.

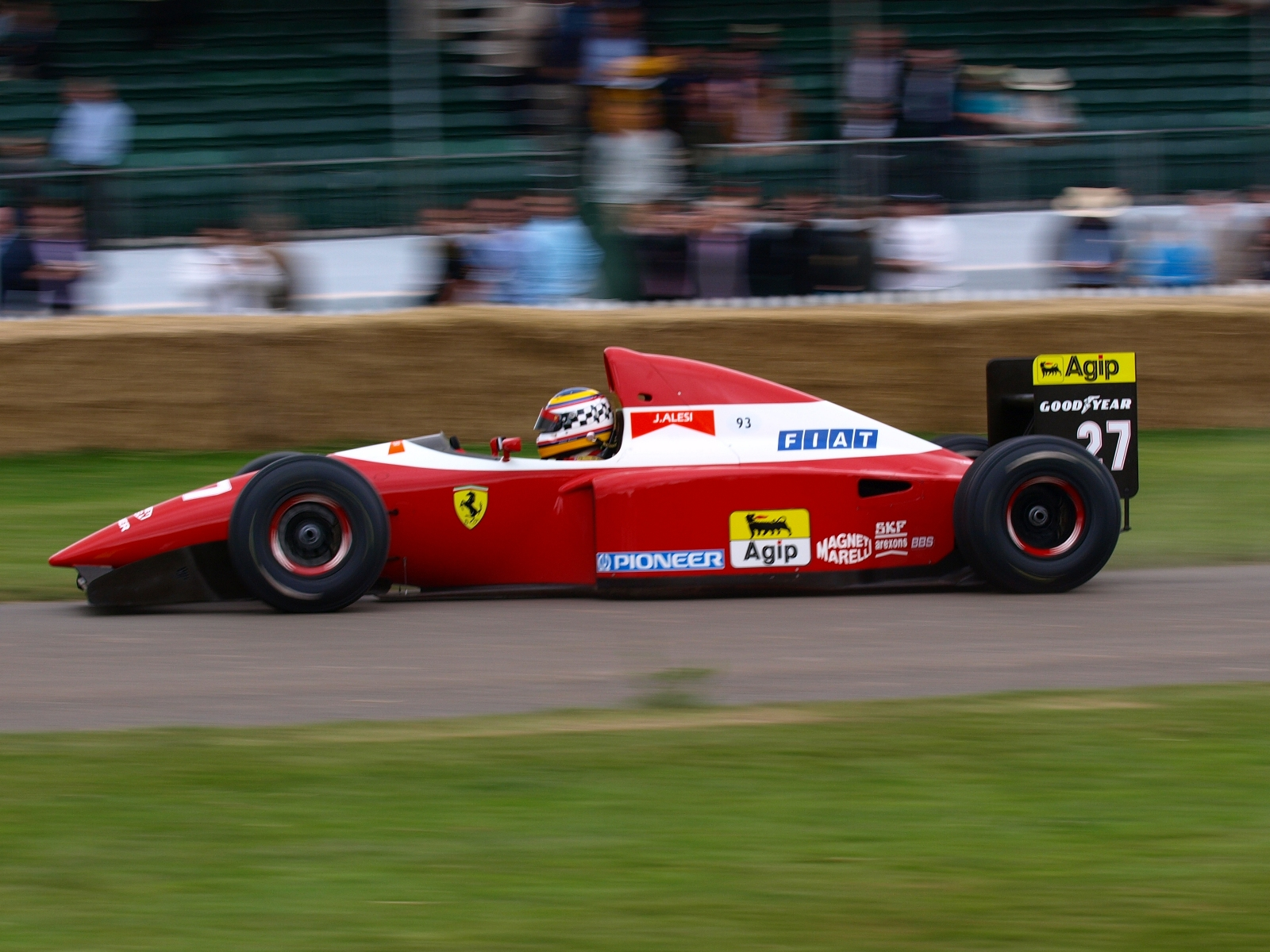
Alesi's Ferrari F93A being demonstrated at The Goodwood Festival of Speed in 2008

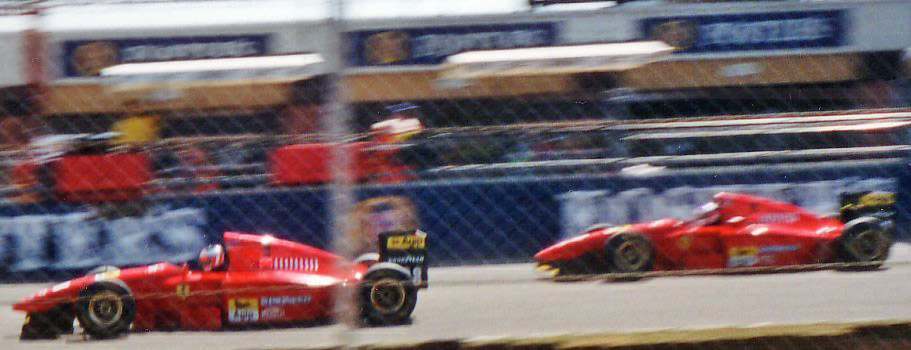
Until 2000, Ferrari used the barcode in countries where tobacco advertising is not allowed, like Great Britain and France. These are Jean Alesi and Gerhard Berger at the 1994 British Grand Prix

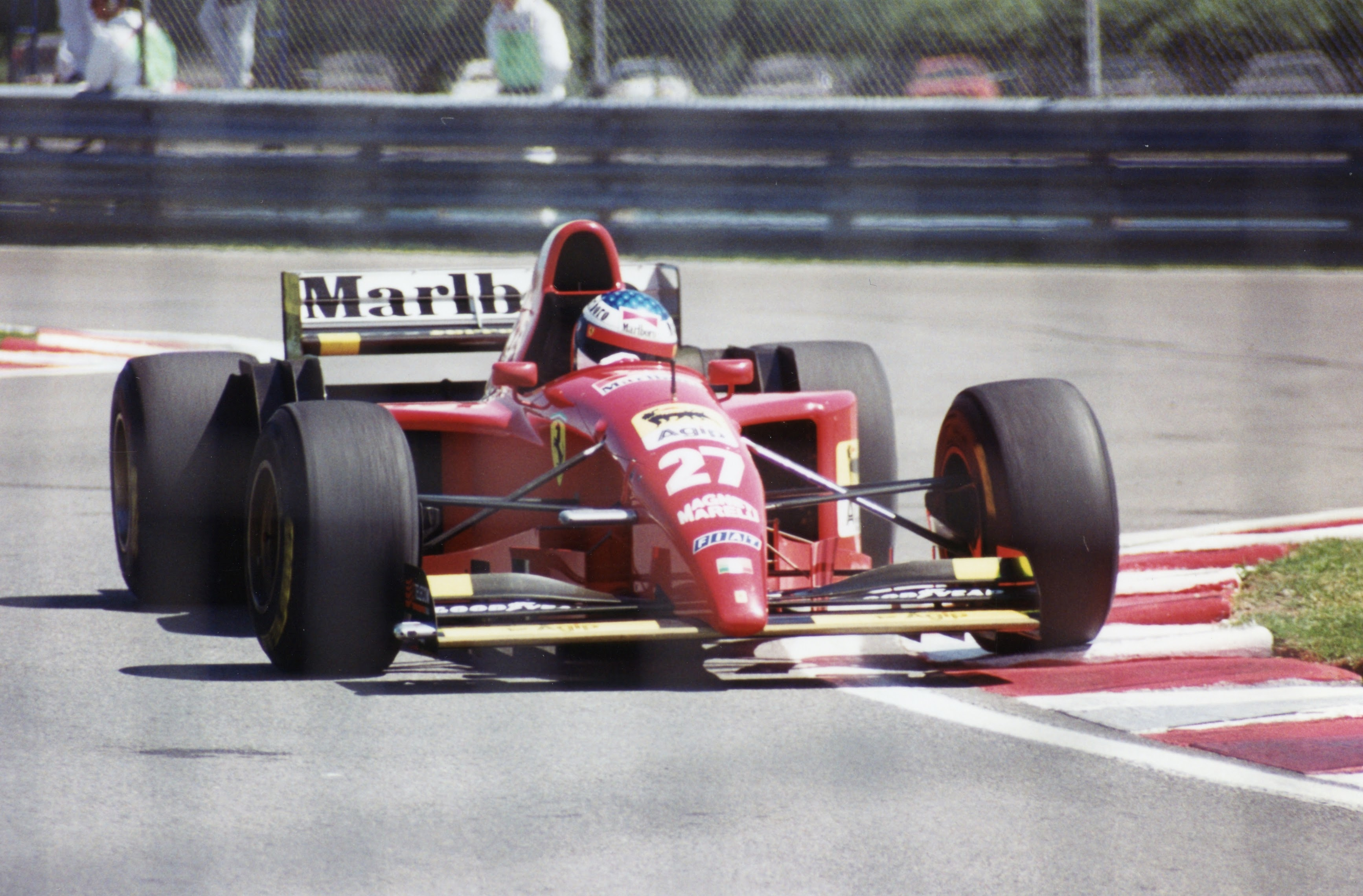
By 1995, the team had received primary sponsorship from Marlboro. This is Jean Alesi driving the Ferrari 412T2 at that year's Canadian Grand Prix to win his first Grand Prix victory.

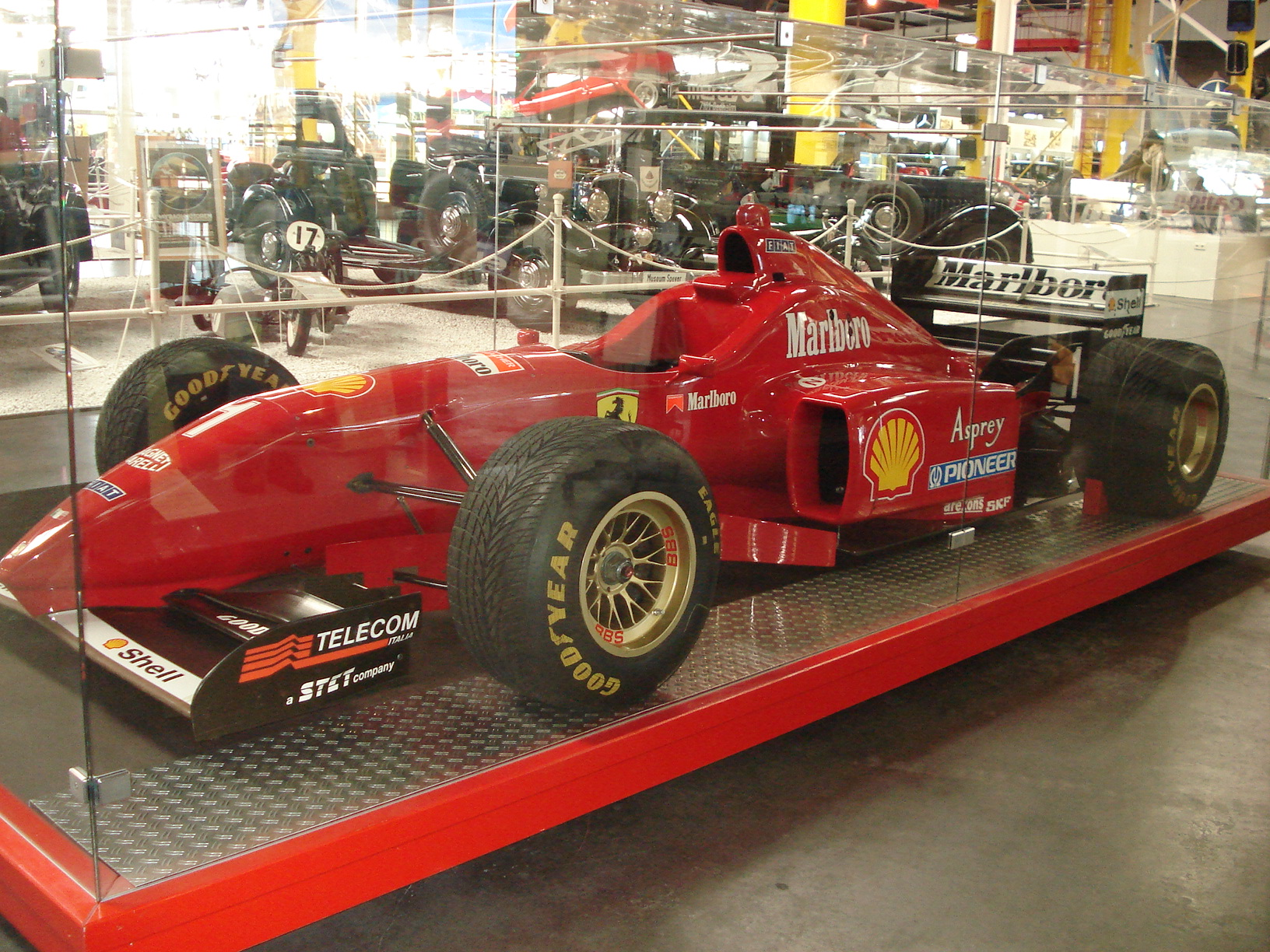
Michael Schumacher's low-nosed Ferrari F310 from 1996.

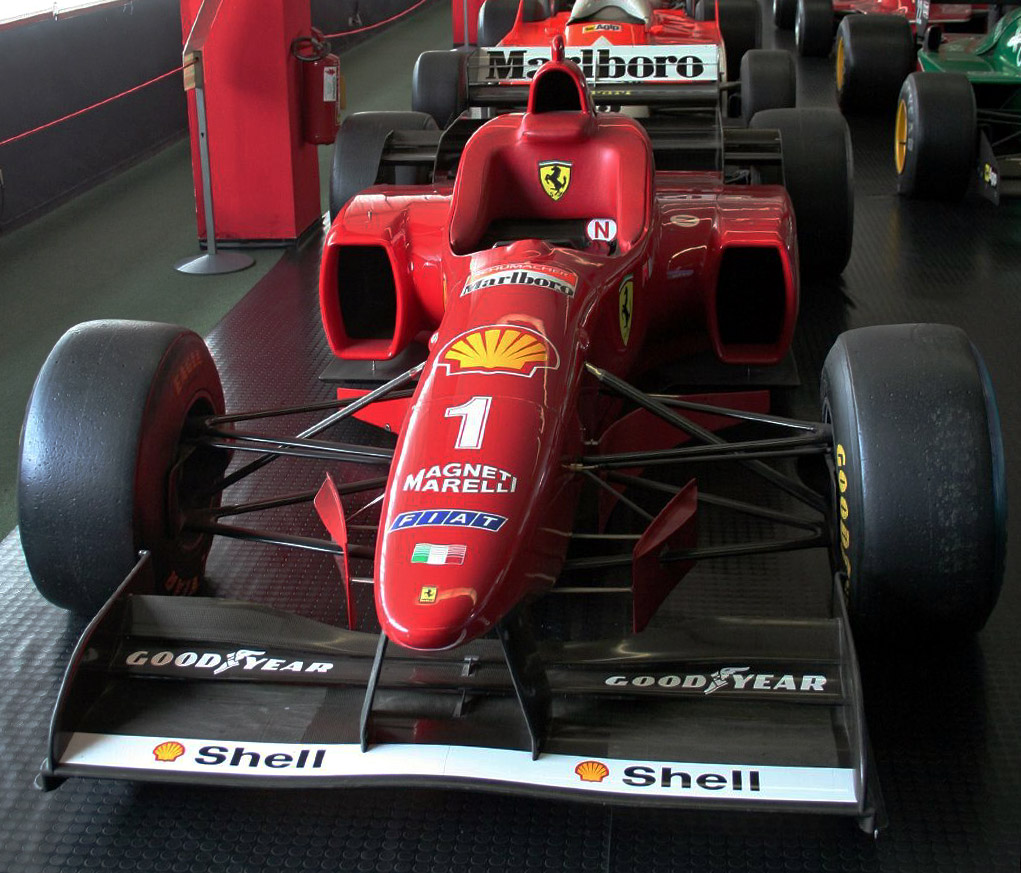
The high-nosed 1996 Ferrari F310 in display.

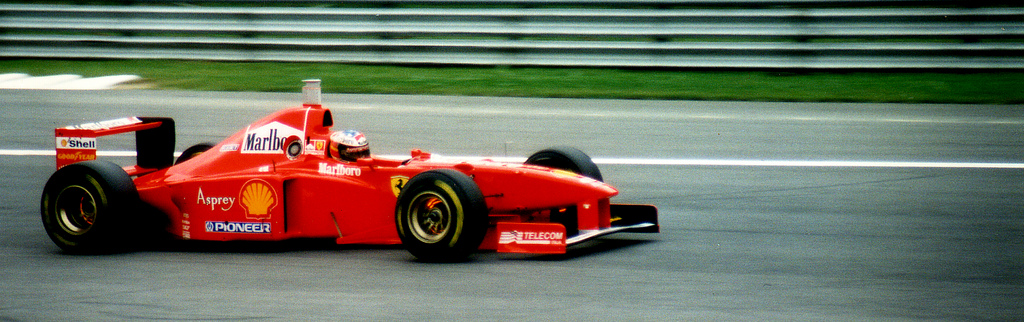
Michael Schumacher driving at the 1997 Italian GP

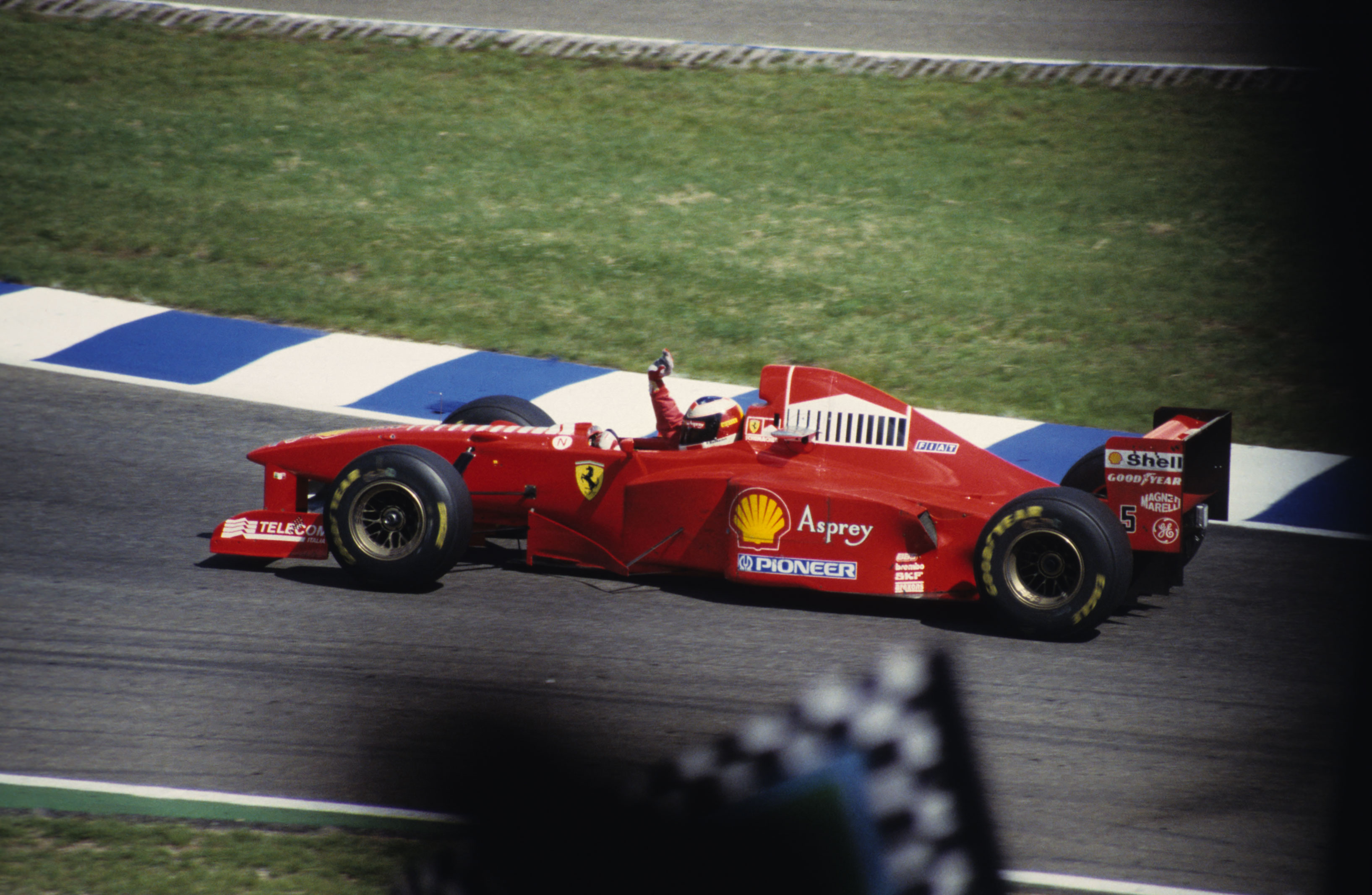
A Ferrari from 1997 season in non-tobacco livery

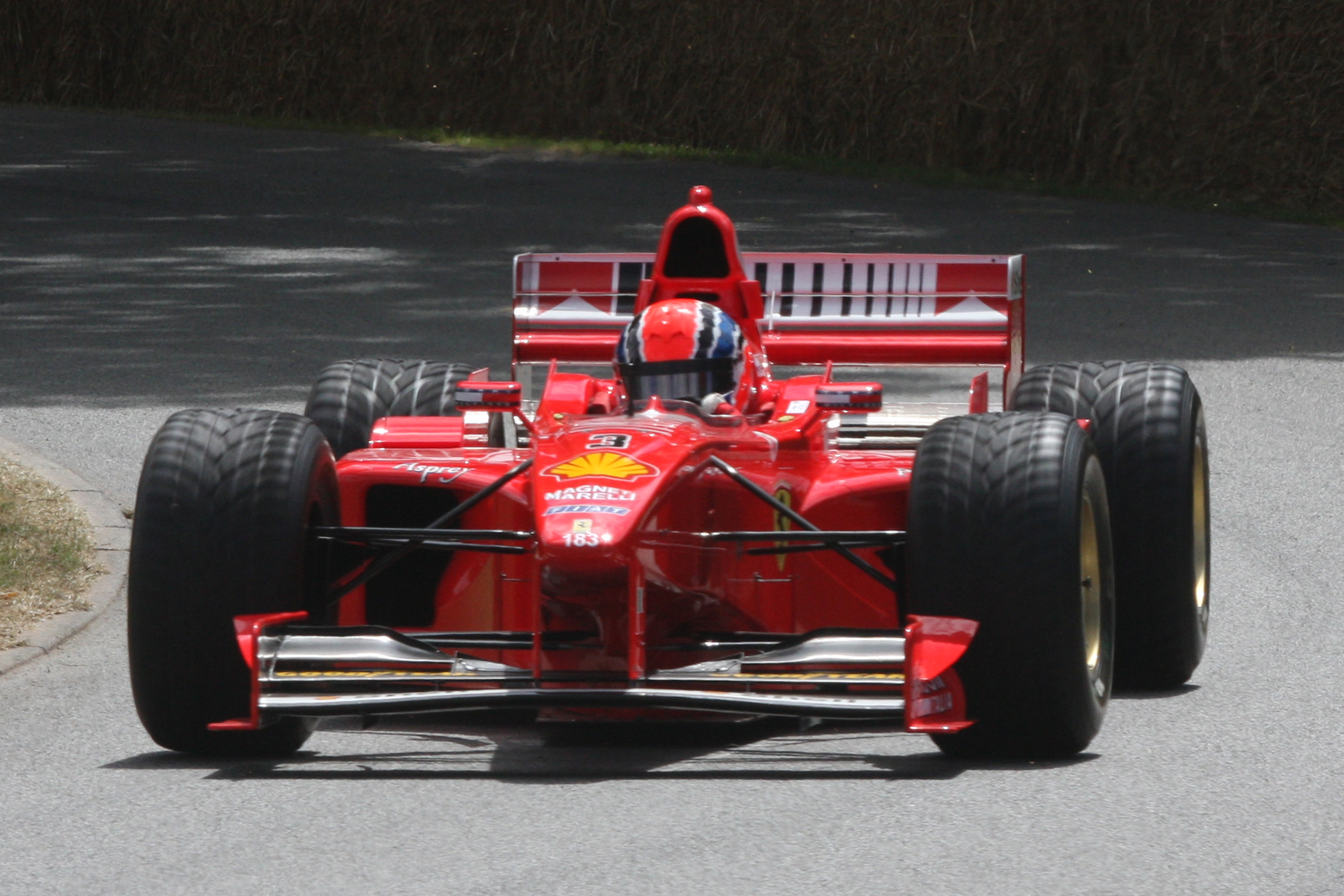
A 1998 Ferrari F300 at the 2009 Goodwood Festival of Speed

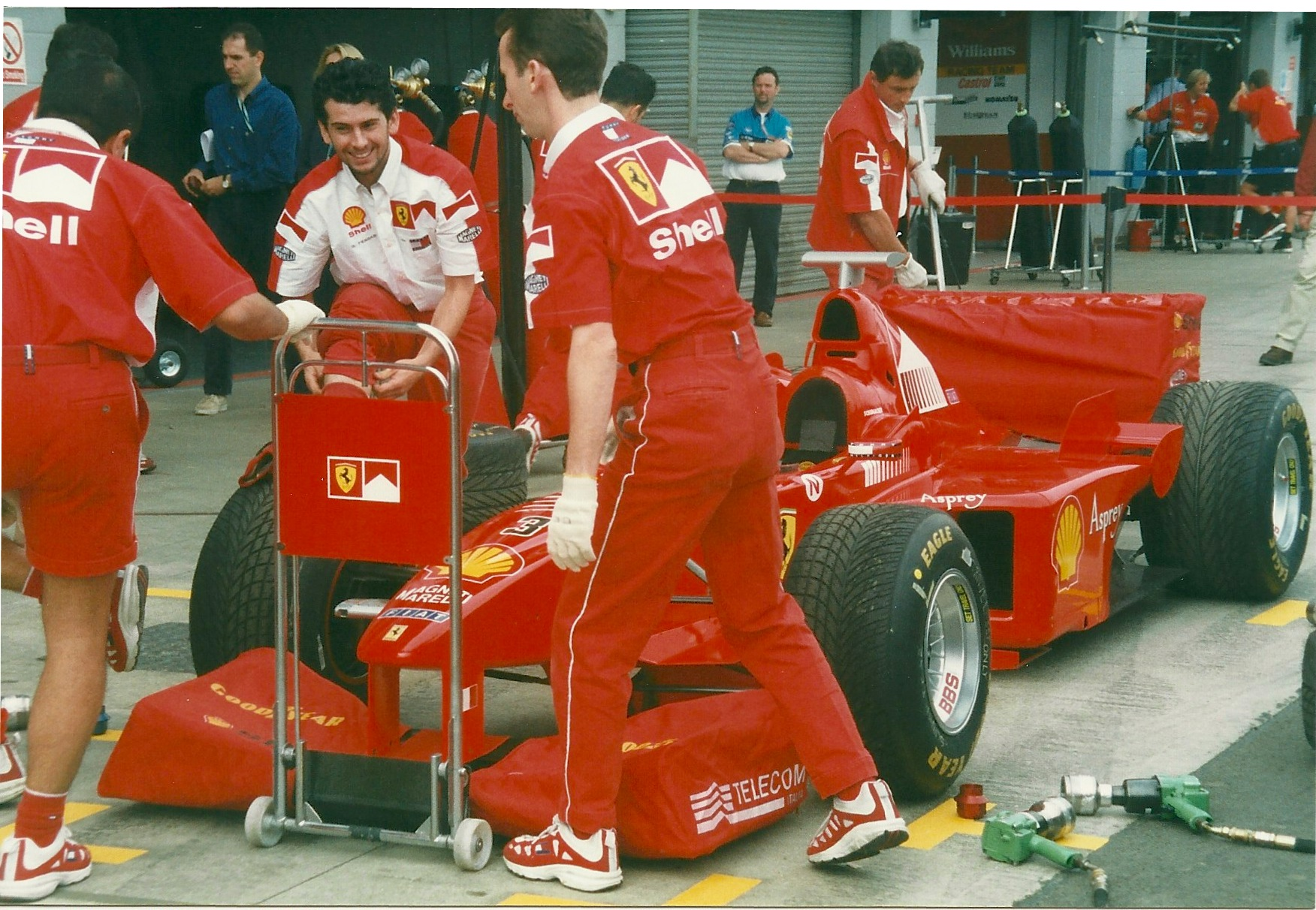
A Ferrari in boxes at the 1998 British GP

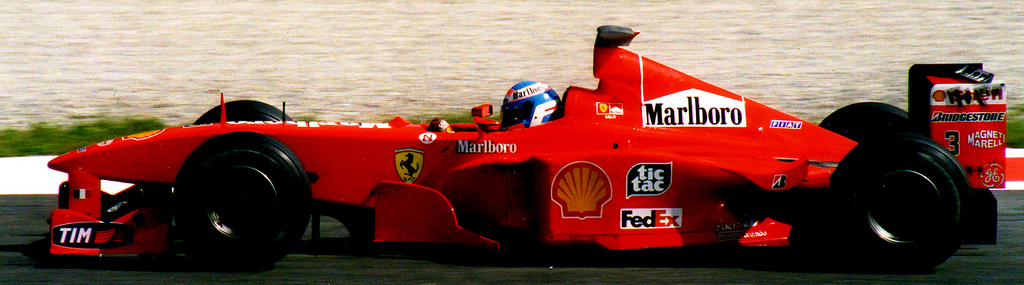
Mika Salo driving for Ferrari at the 1999 Italian GP

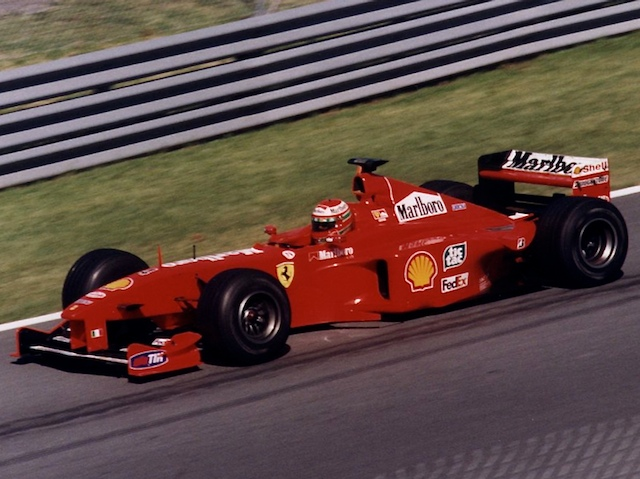
Eddie Irvine driving for Ferrari at the 1999 Canadian GP

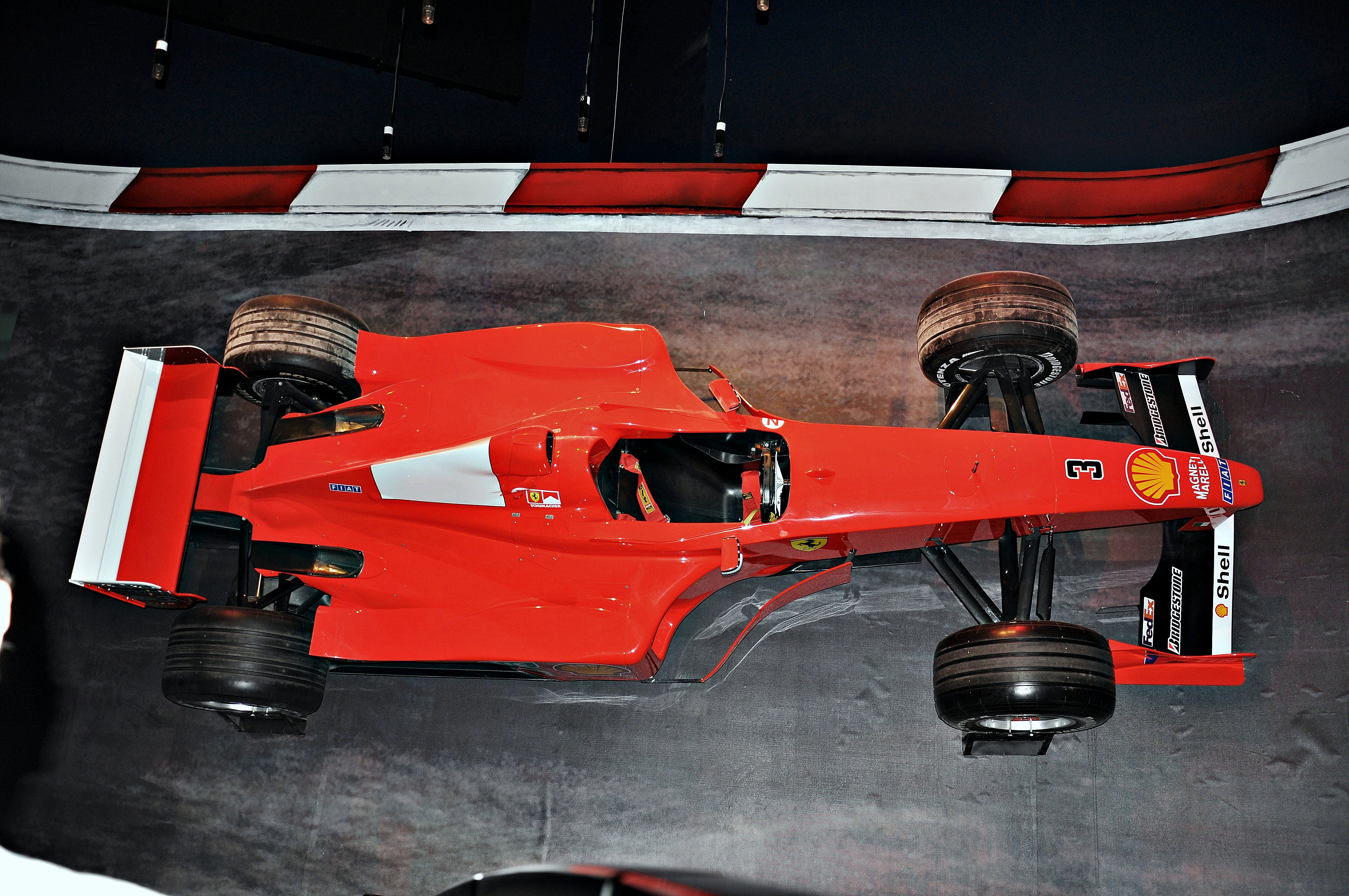
The Ferrari F399 from 1999 season in its non-tobacco version in display at Abu Dhabi

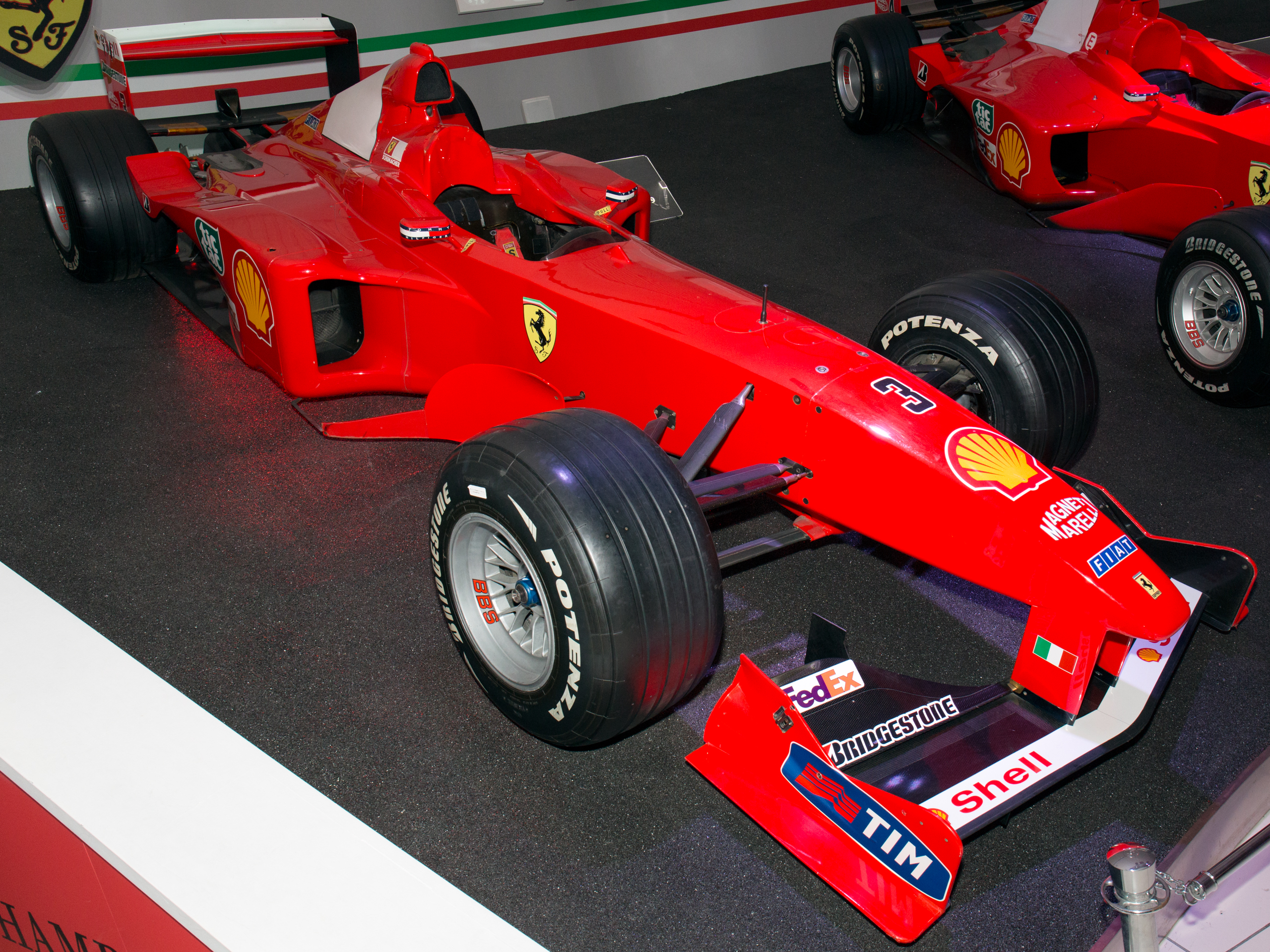
A 1999 Ferrari F399 in non-tobacco livery in display at Ferrari Museum.

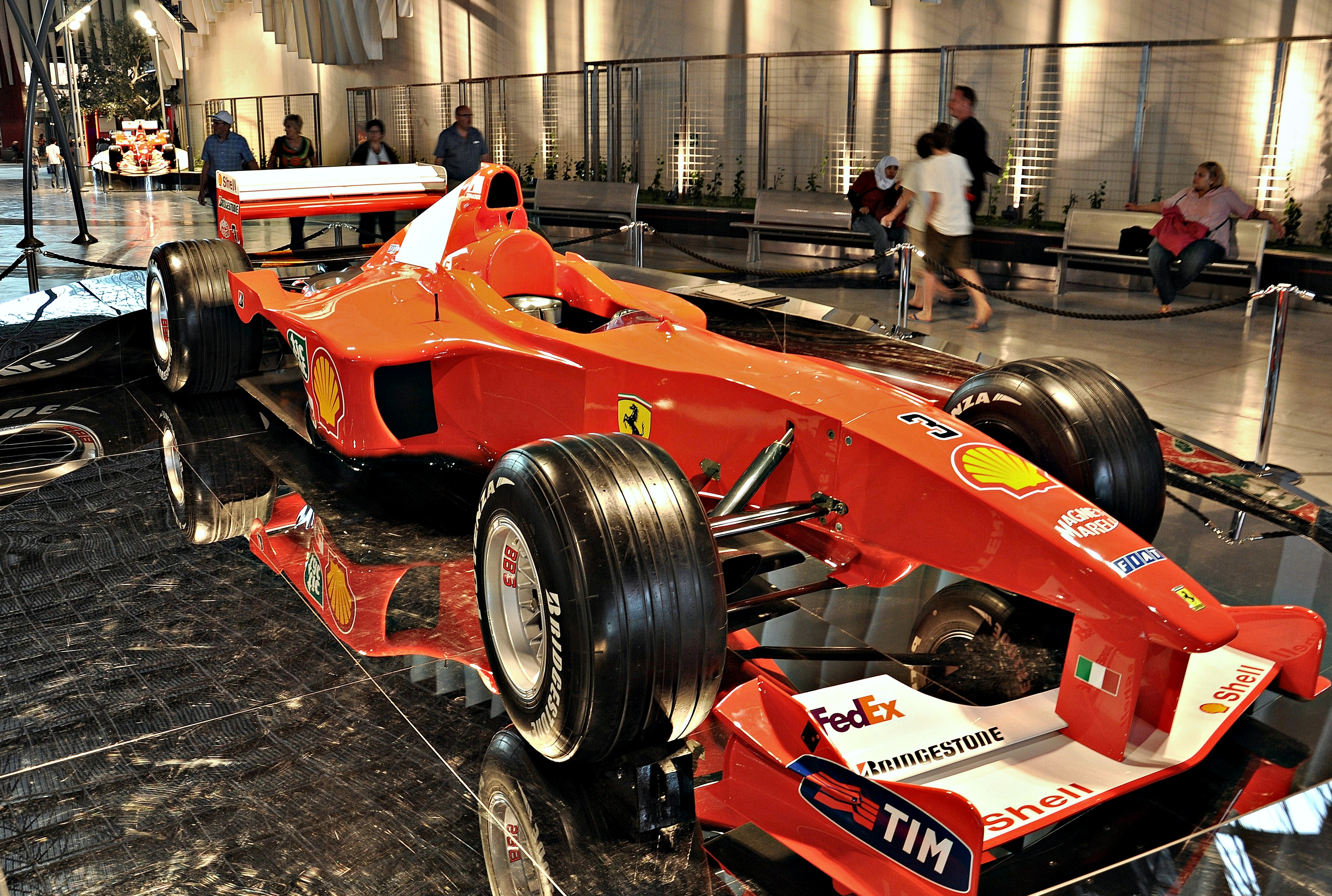
A 2000 Ferrari F1-2000 in non-tobacco livery in display.

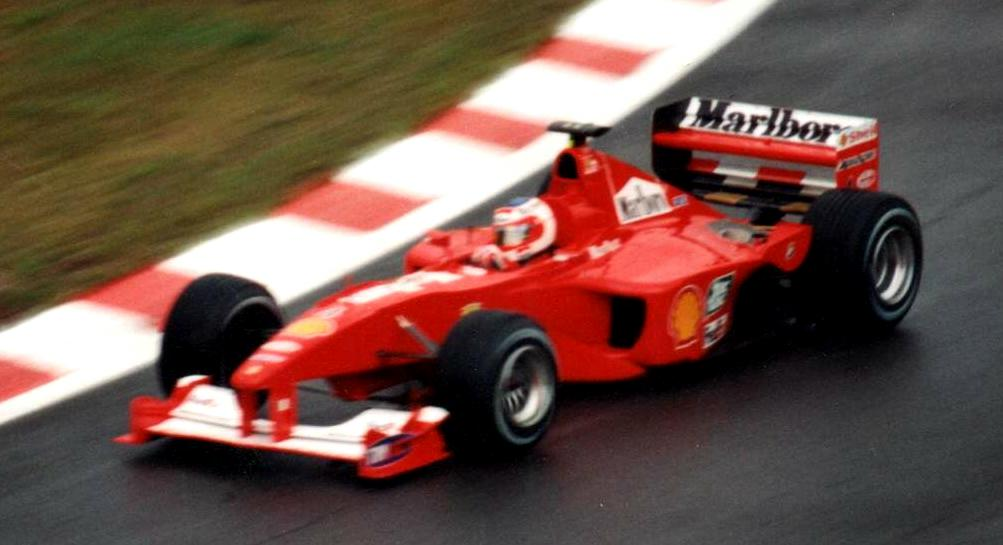
Rubens Barrichello driving for Ferrari at 2000 Belgian GP

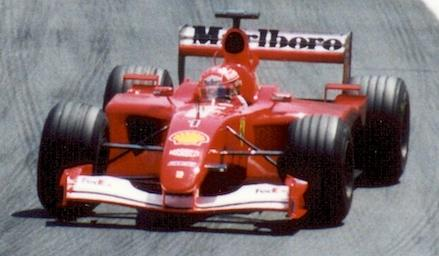
Michael Schumacher driving the Scuderia Ferrari F2001 at the 2001 Canadian Grand Prix, showing sponsorship from Marlboro, Shell, Fiat, and Magneti Marelli

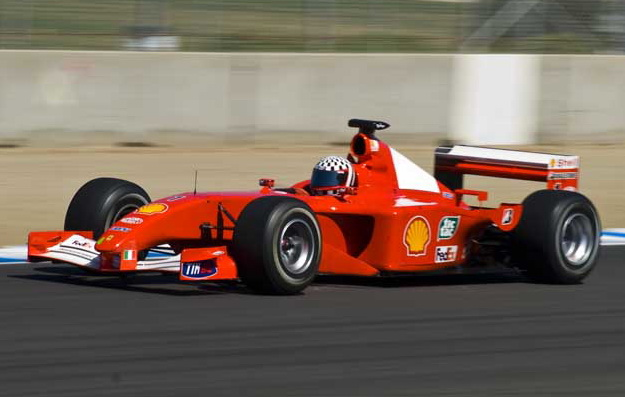
A Ferrari F2001 in non-tobacco livery being driven in Laguna Seca

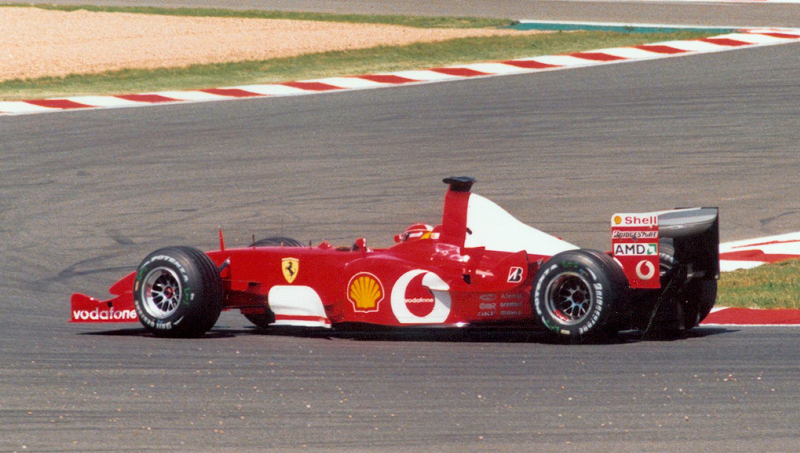
Michael Schumacher driving the Scuderia Ferrari F2002 at the 2002 French Grand Prix, showing sponsorship from Vodafone, Shell, and the white space replacing Marlboro at North American and most European races.

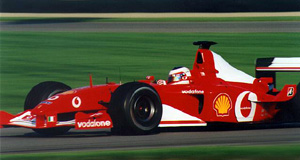
Rubens Barrichello driving the Scuderia Ferrari F2002 at the 2002 United States Grand Prix, showing sponsorship from Vodafone, Shell, and the white space replacing Marlboro at North American and most European races.

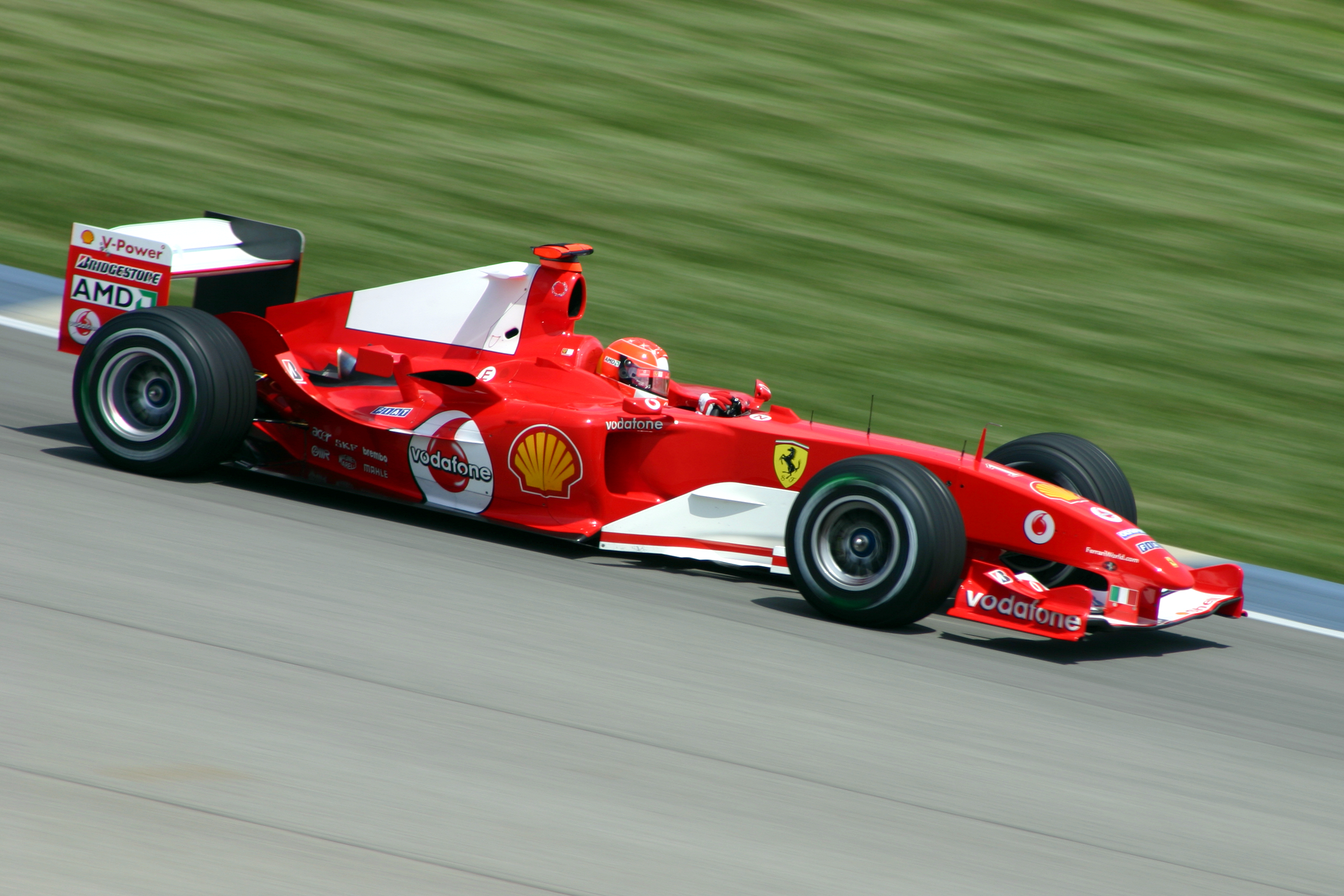
Schumacher at the 2004 United States Grand Prix driving the Scuderia Ferrari F2004 with completely white spaced Marlboro

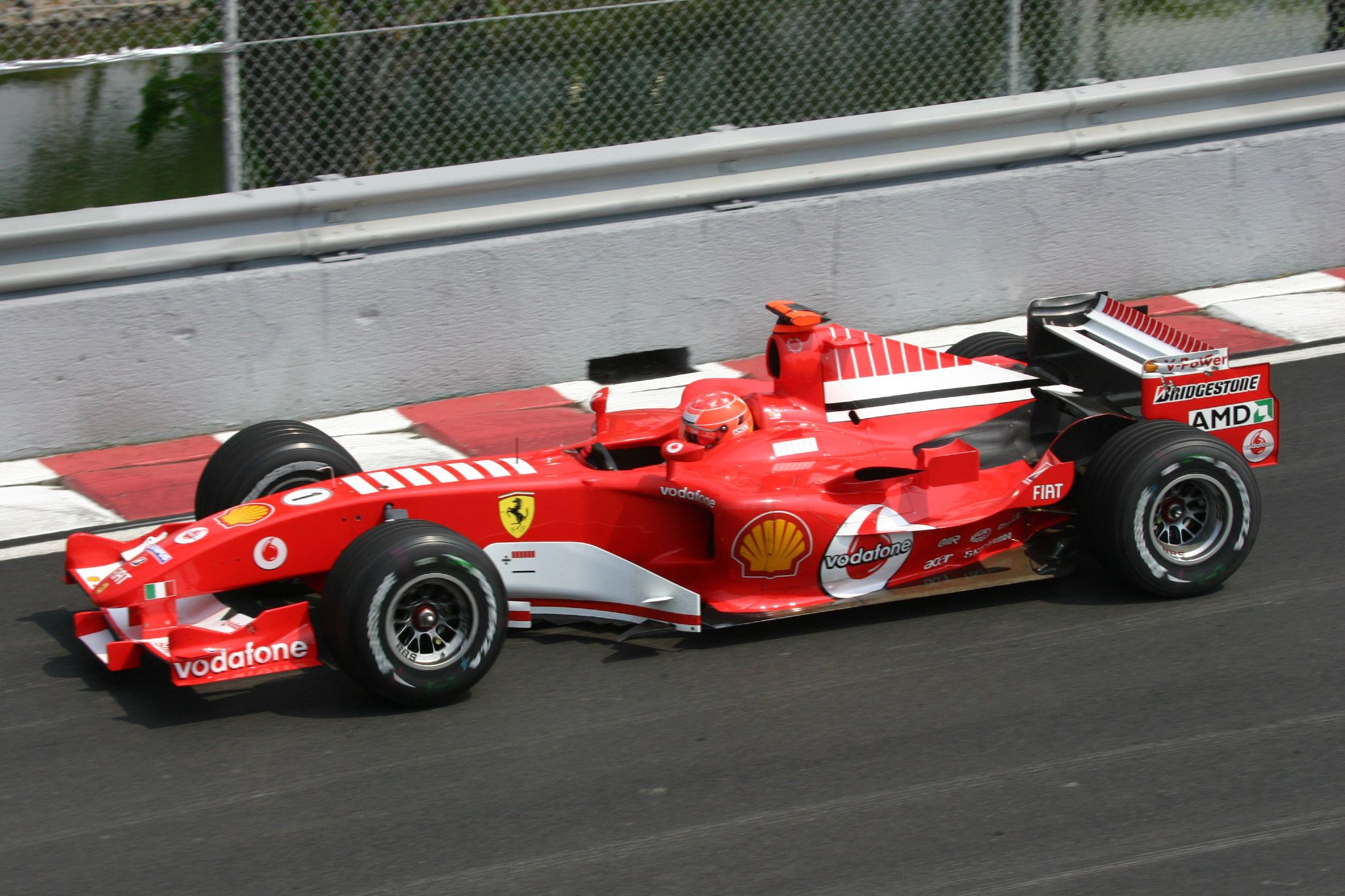
A Ferrari F2005 being driven by Michael Schumacher at the 2005 Canada GP with the Marlboro "Barcode".

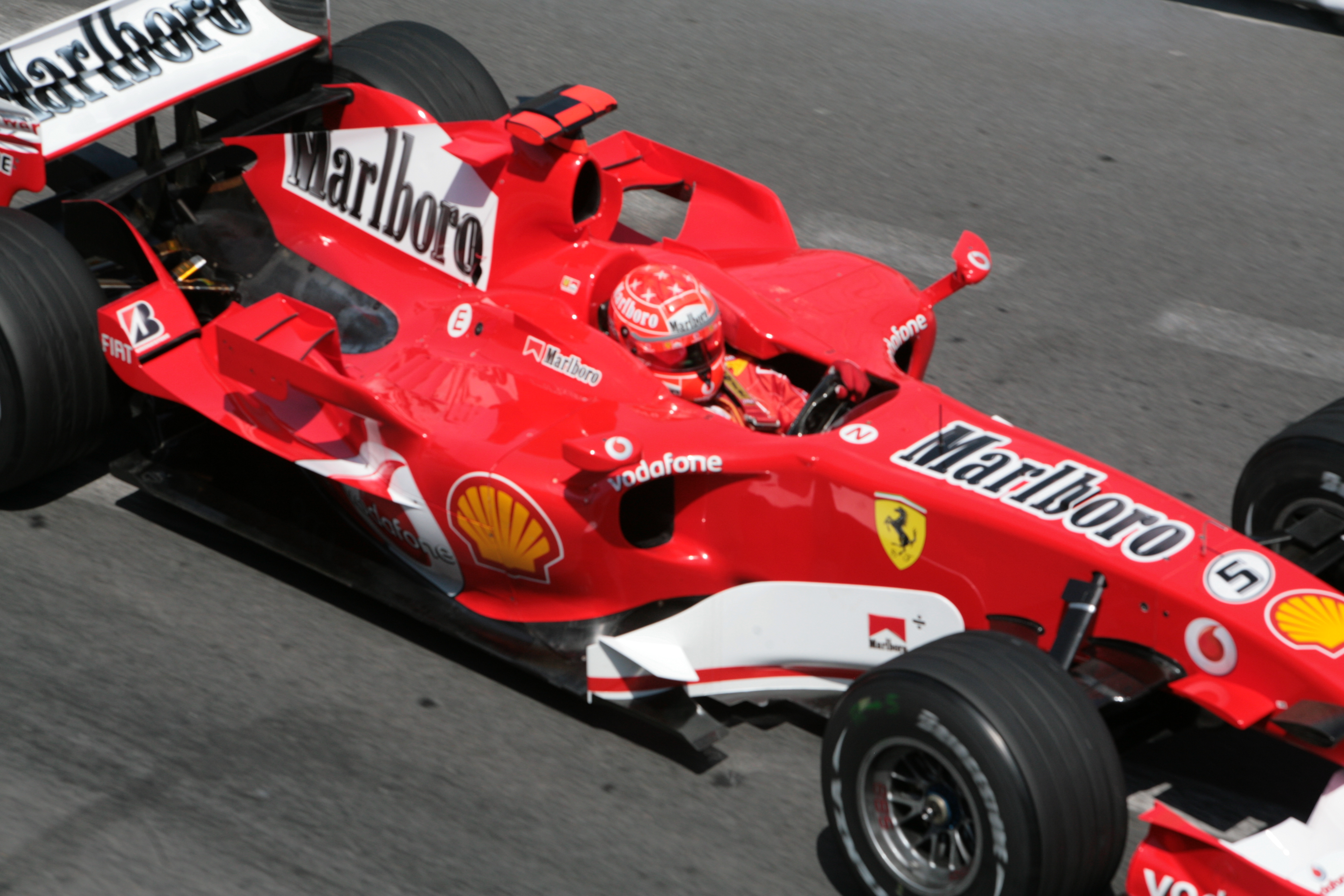
Michael Schumacher driving the Ferrari 248 F1 at the 2006 Monaco Grand Prix, with Marlboro sponsorship clearly seen on the car.

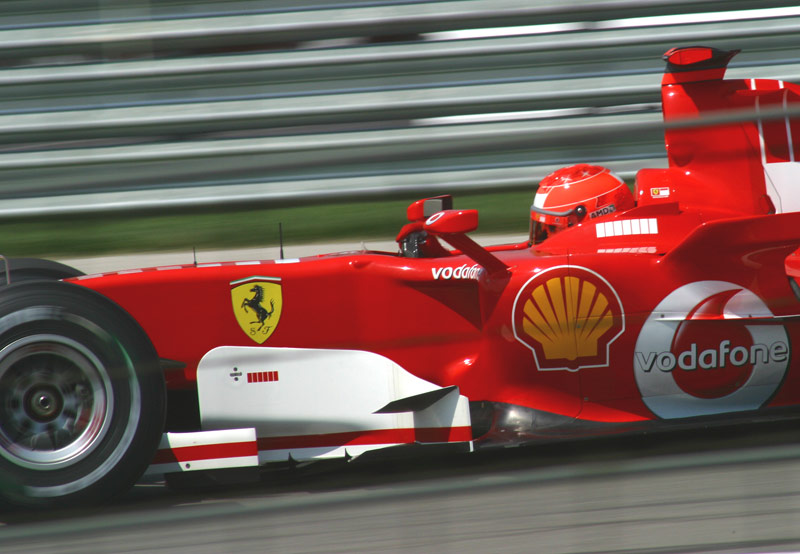
Michael Schumacher driving the Ferrari 248 F1 at the 2006 United States Grand Prix, showing sponsorship from Vodafone, Shell, and the Marlboro "barcode".

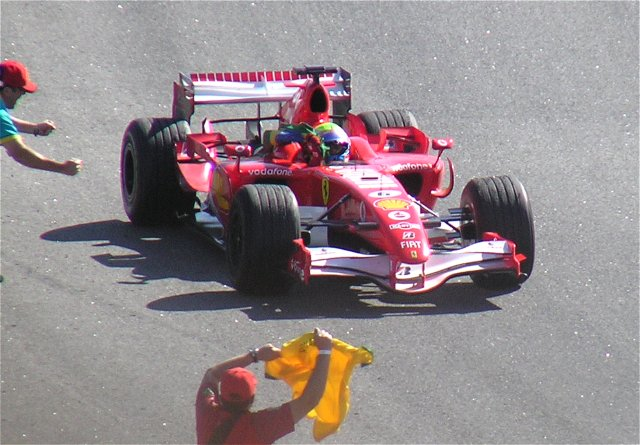
Felipe Massa winning the 2006 Brazilian Grand Prix driving the Ferrari 248 F1 with Marlboro replaced by bar codes and with added sponsors from Martini and Bridgestone

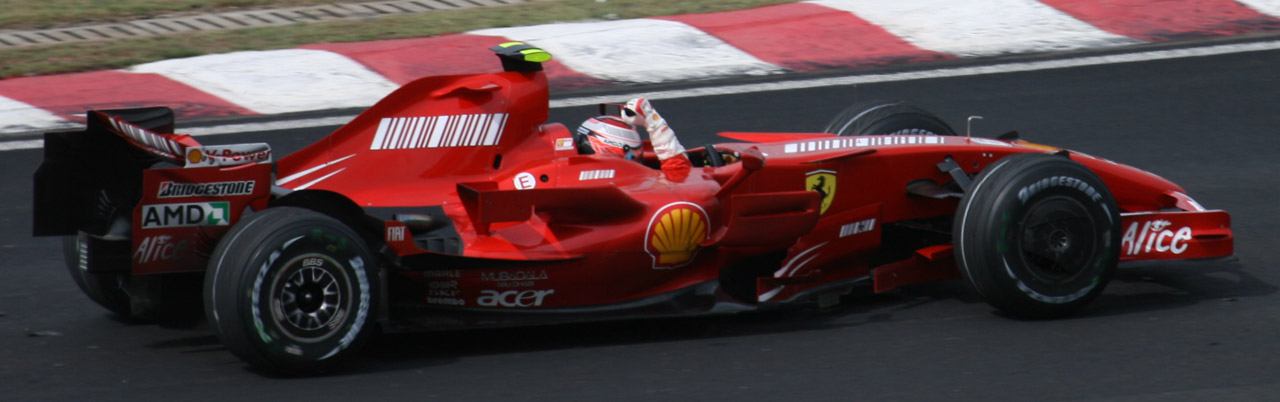
Kimi Räikkönen driving the Ferrari F2007 winning the 2007 Brazilian Grand Prix and the World Drivers' Championship for the first time. The car itself at the start of the year had Marlboro sponsorship but dropped it by the European season

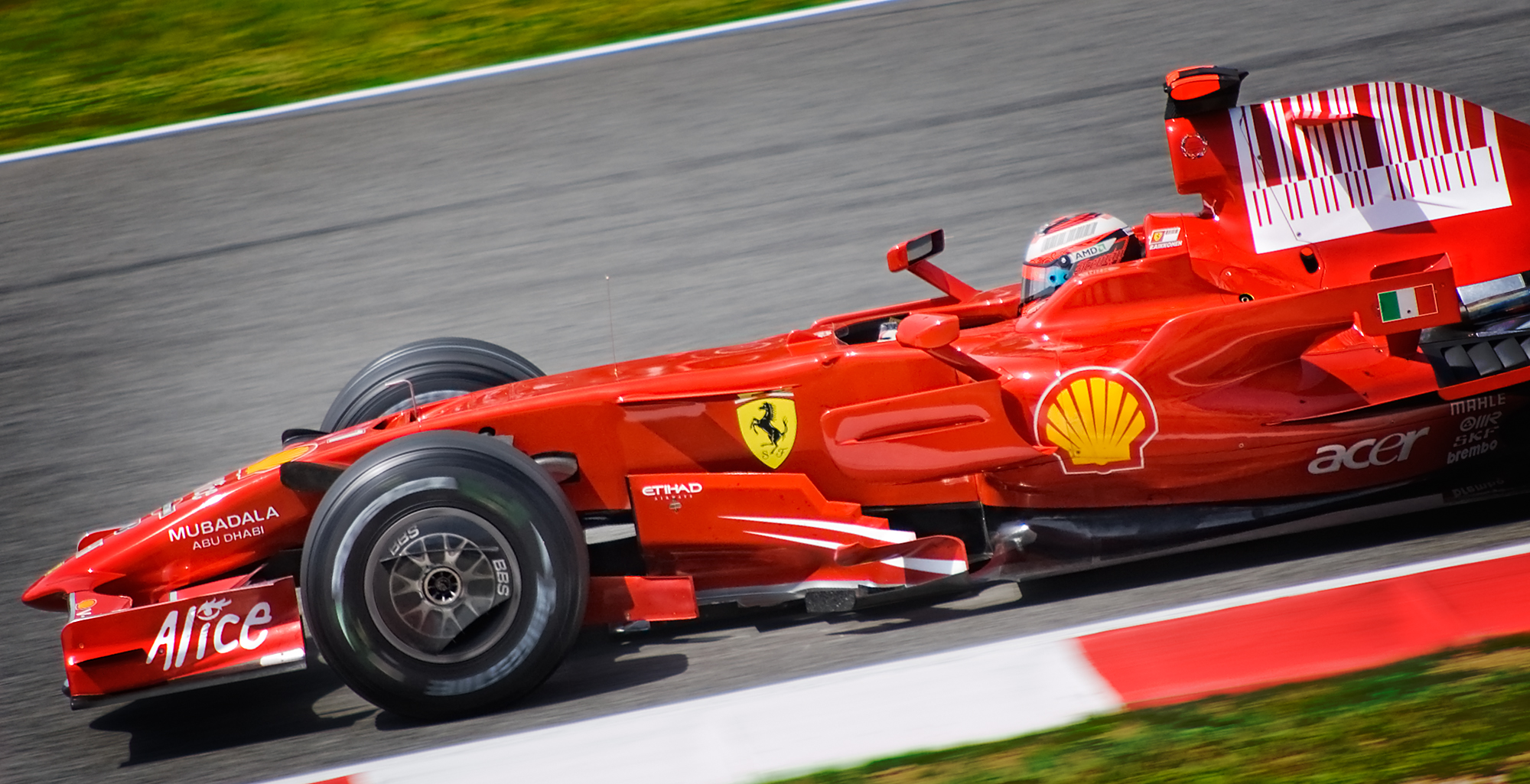
Kimi Räikkönen driving the Ferrari F2008 at the 2008 Spanish Grand Prix.

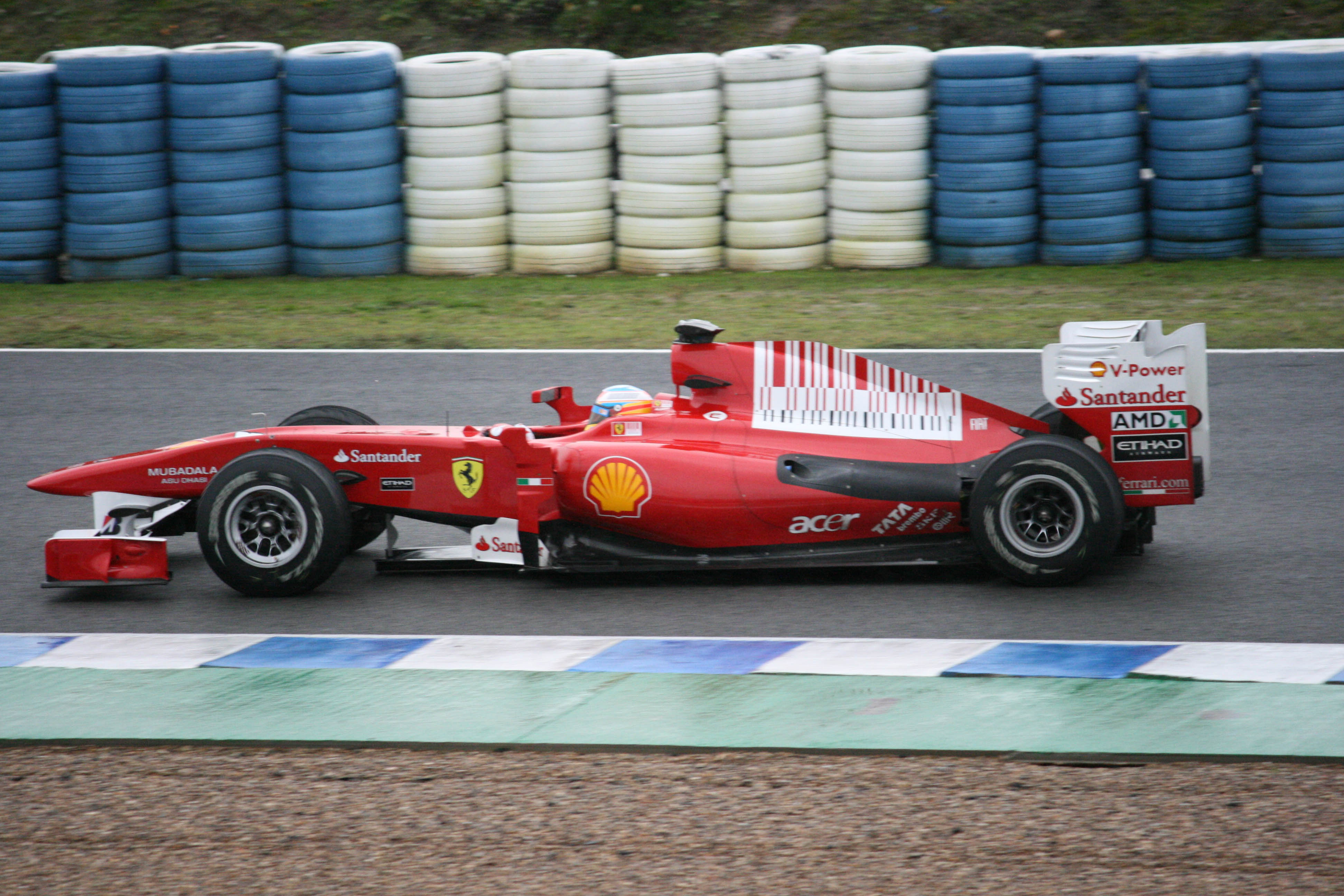
Fernando Alonso testing the Ferrari F10 during pre-season testing in Jerez, February 2010.

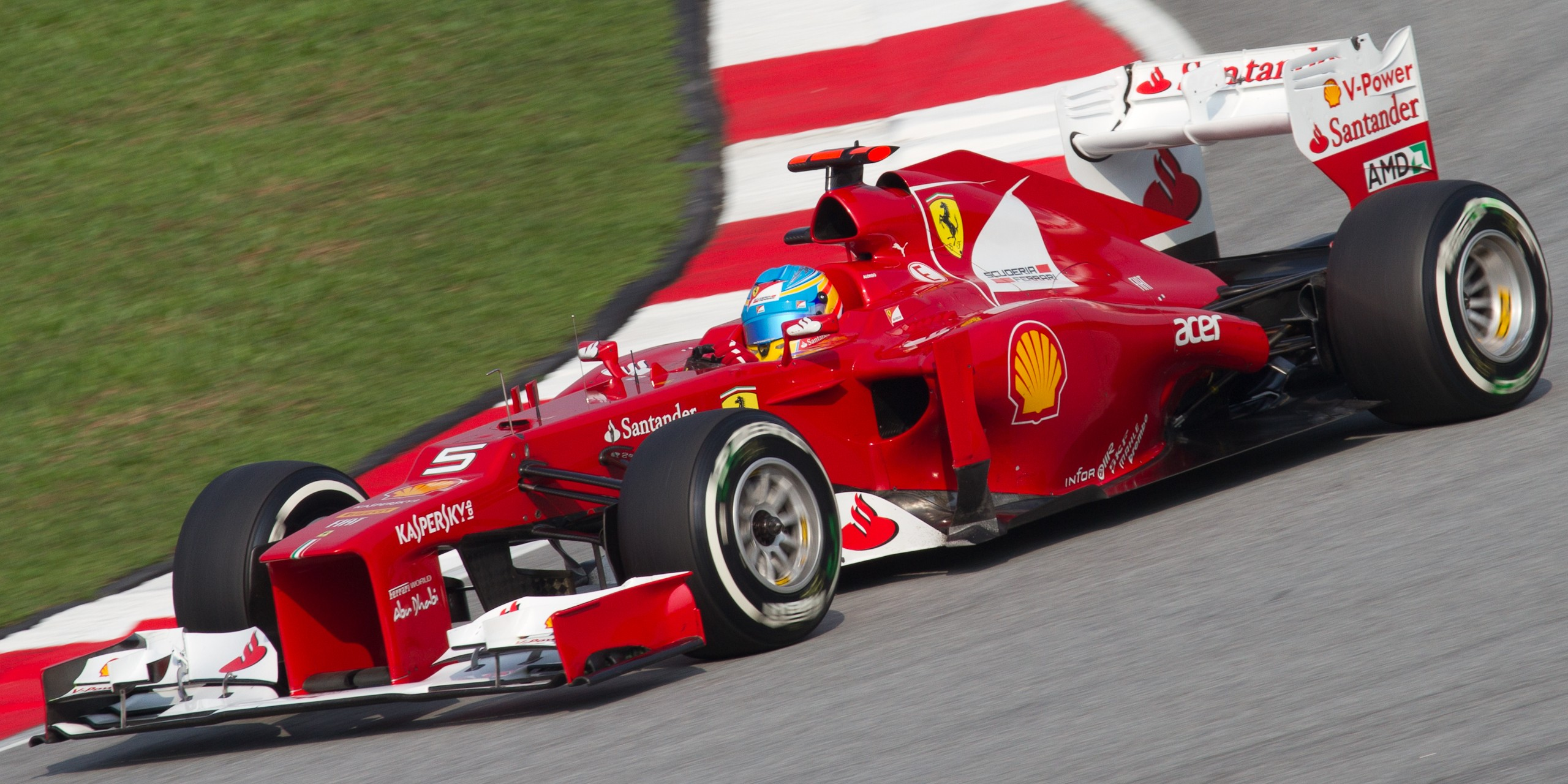
Alonso driving the F2012 at the 2012 Malaysian Grand Prix

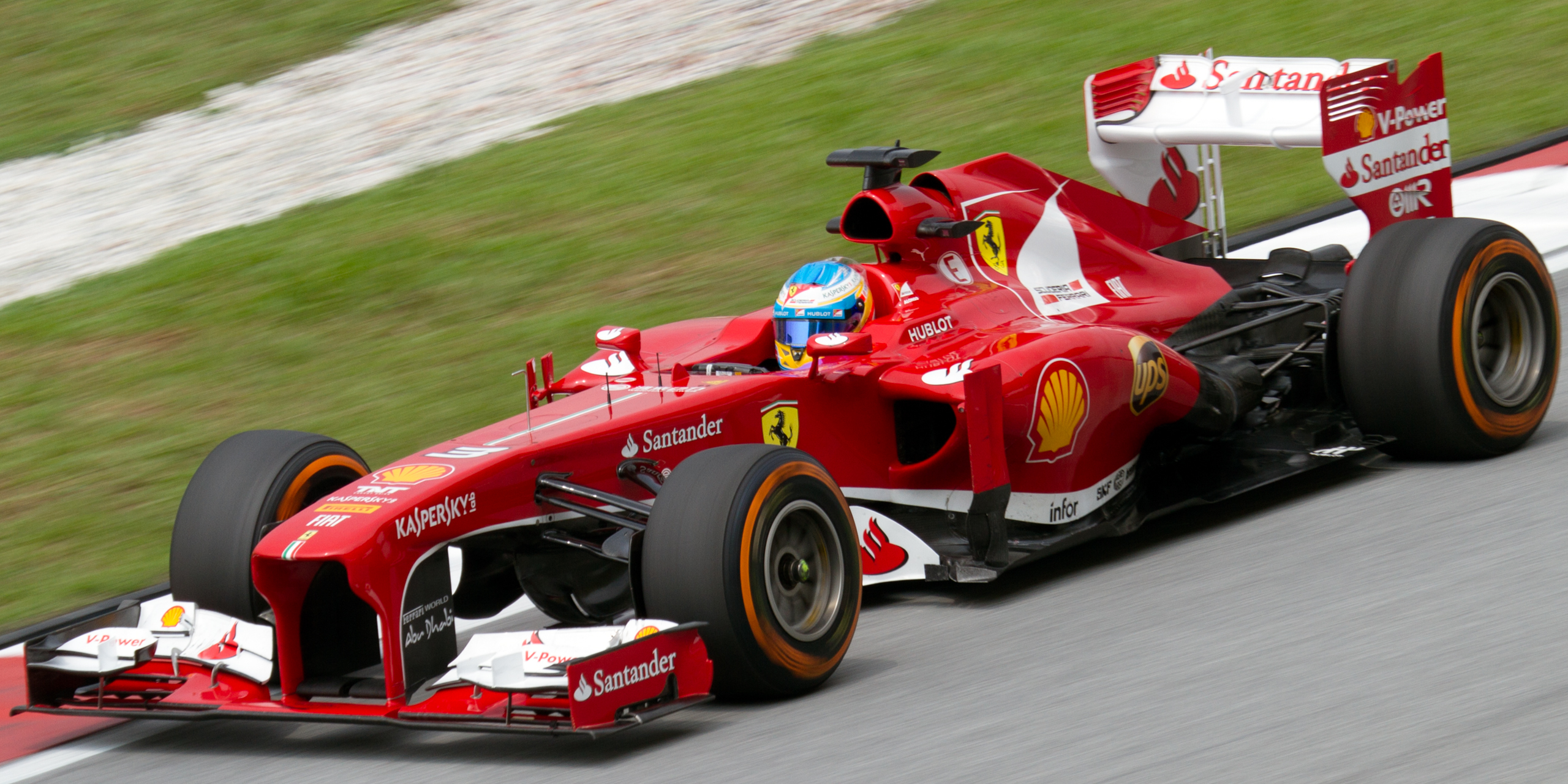
Alonso driving the F138 at the 2013 Malaysian Grand Prix

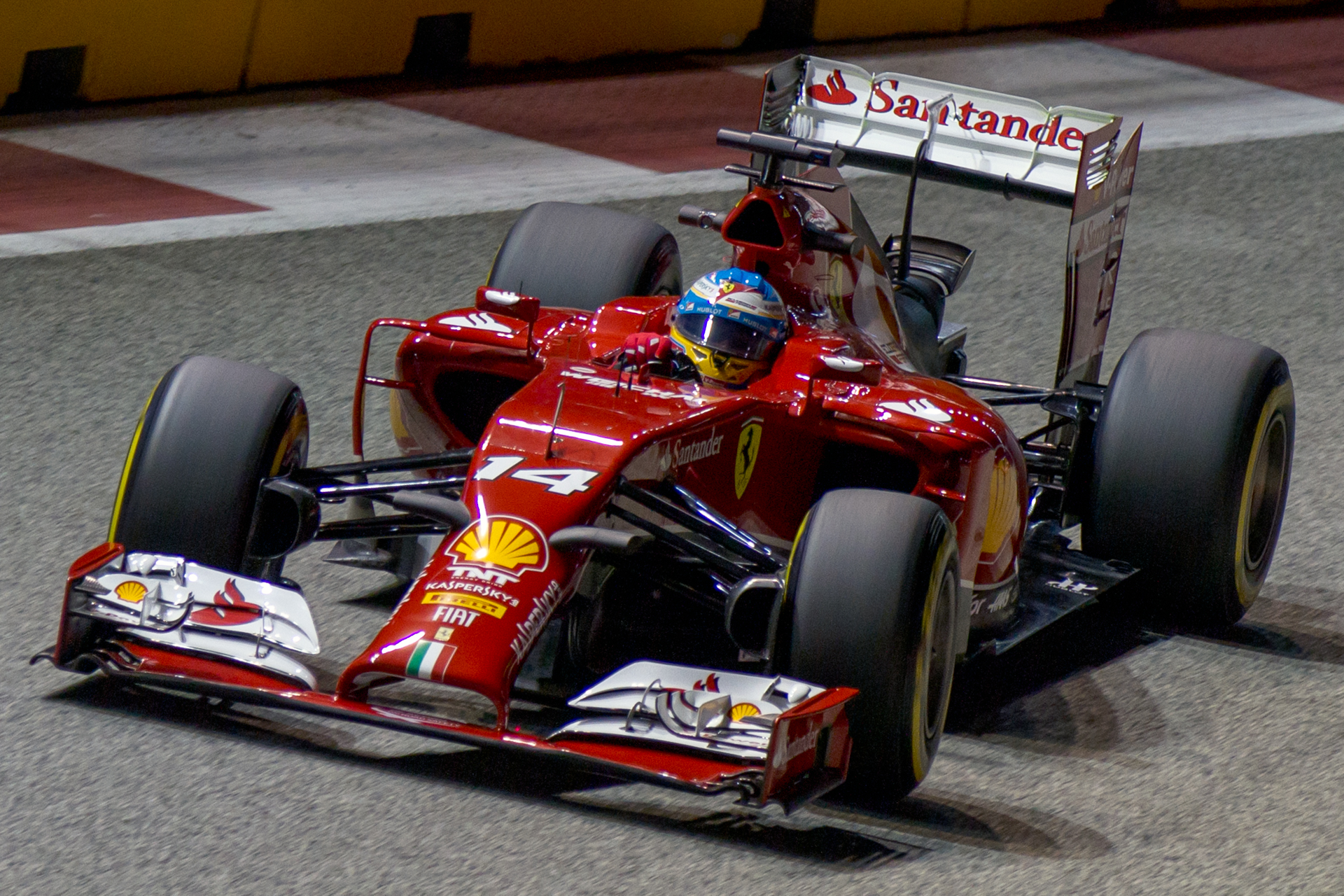
Alonso at the 2014 Singapore Grand Prix

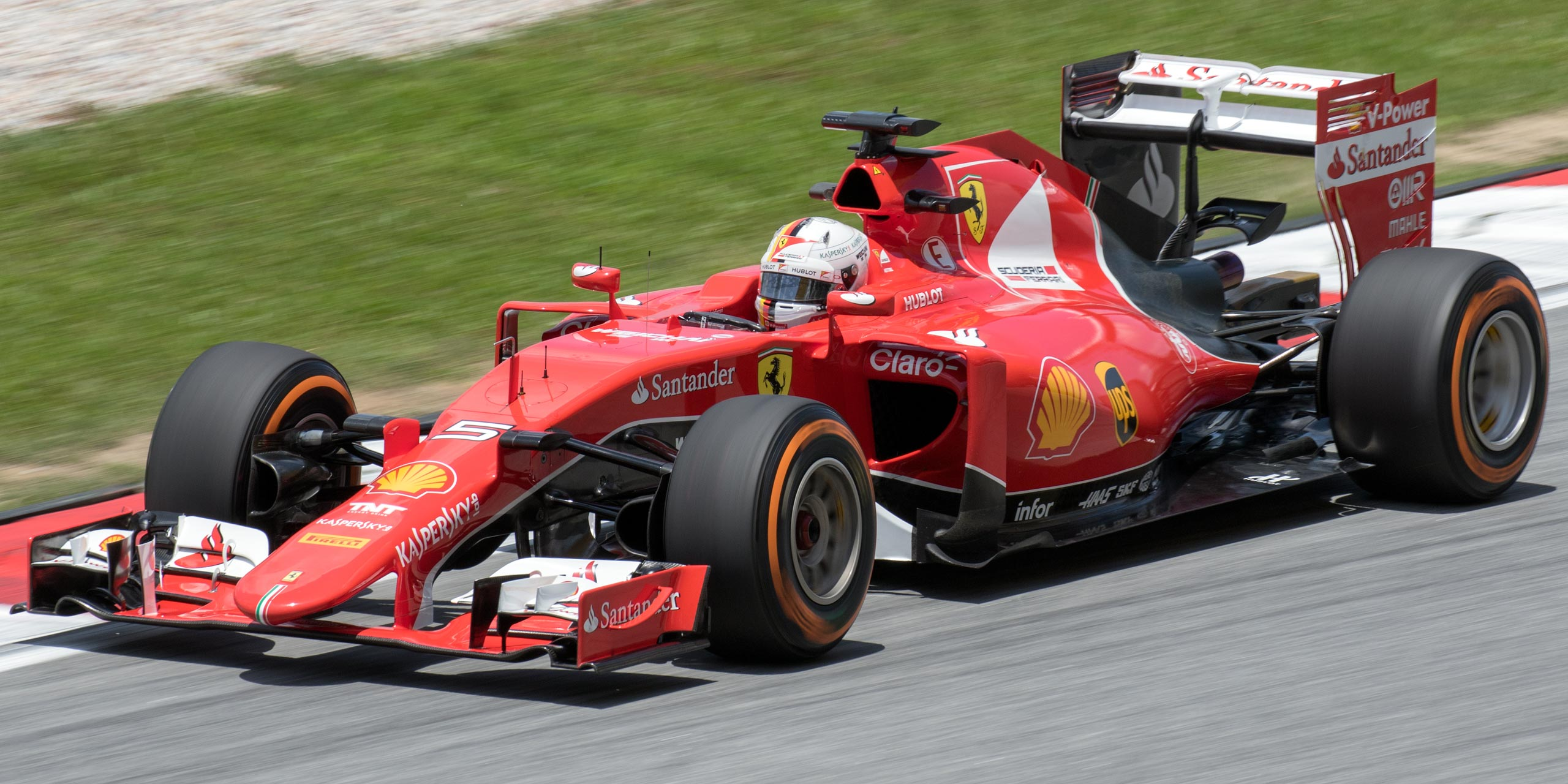
Sebastian Vettel at the 2015 Malaysian Grand Prix

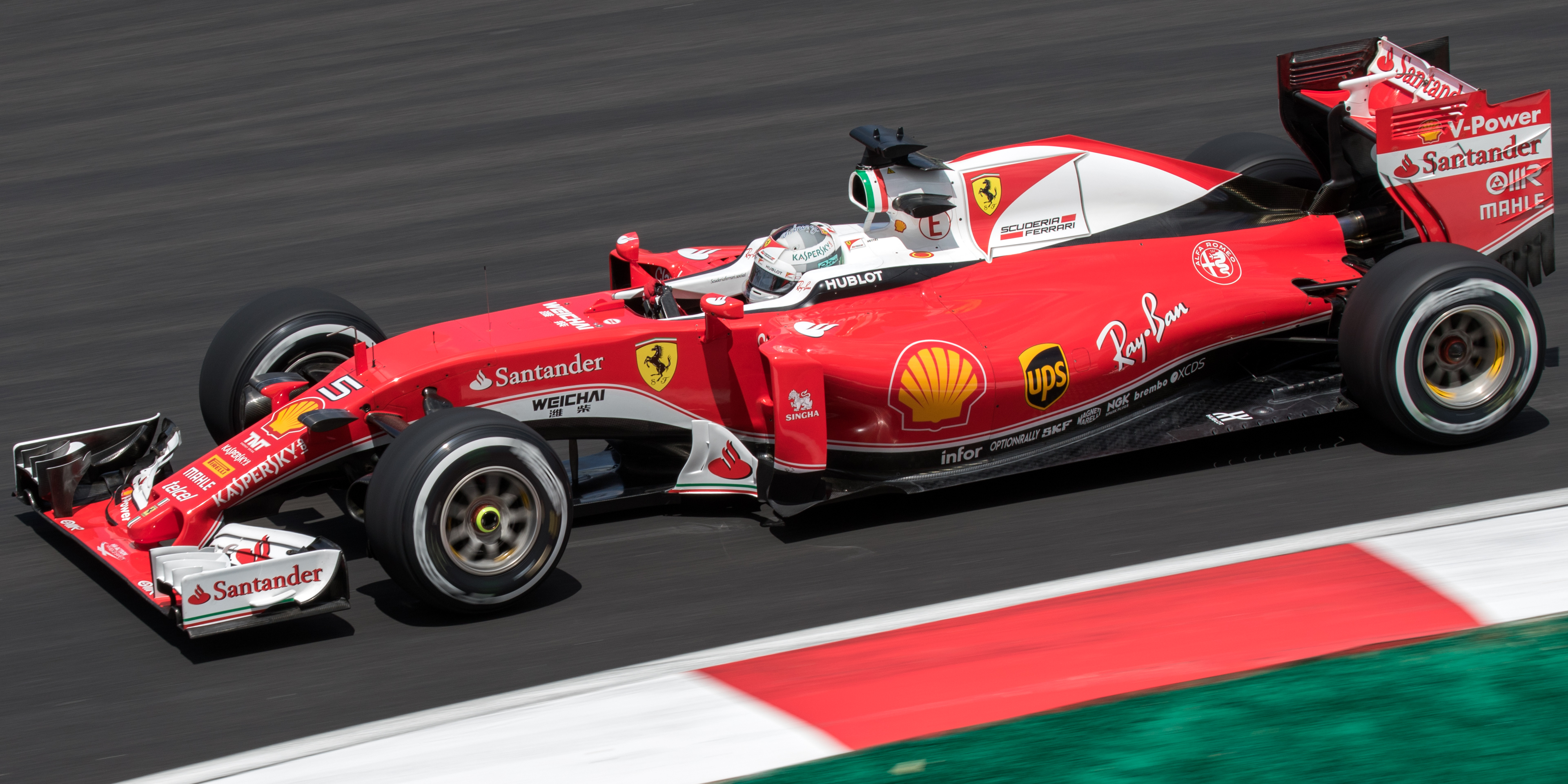
Sebastian Vettel at the 2016 Malaysian Grand Prix

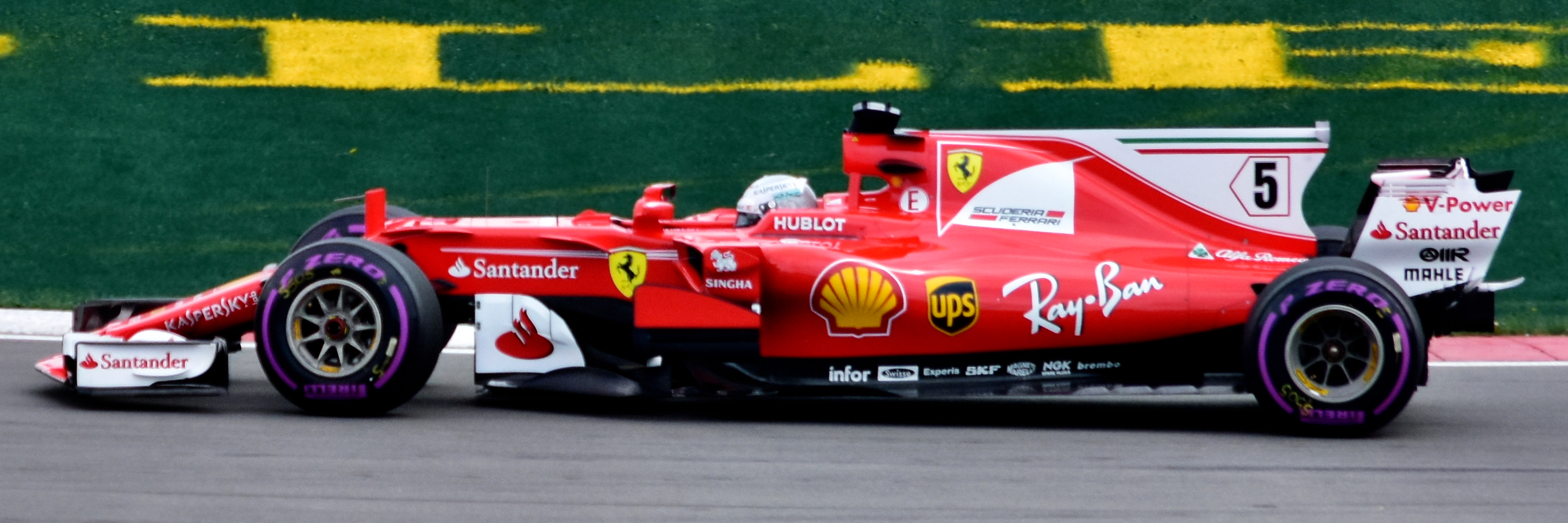
Sebastian Vettel at the 2017 Canadian Grand Prix.

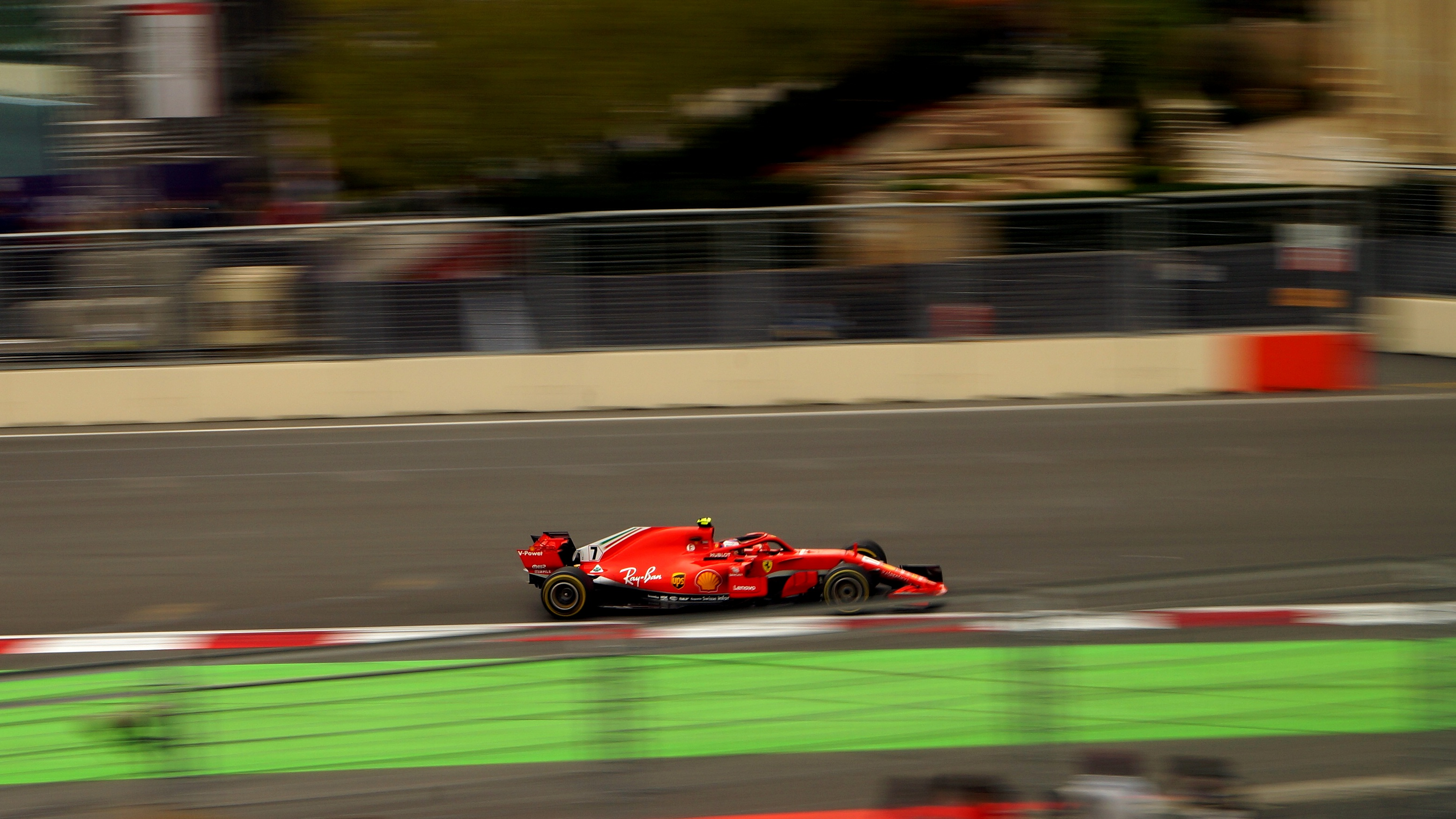
Kimi Räikkönen at the 2018 Azerbaijan Grand Prix

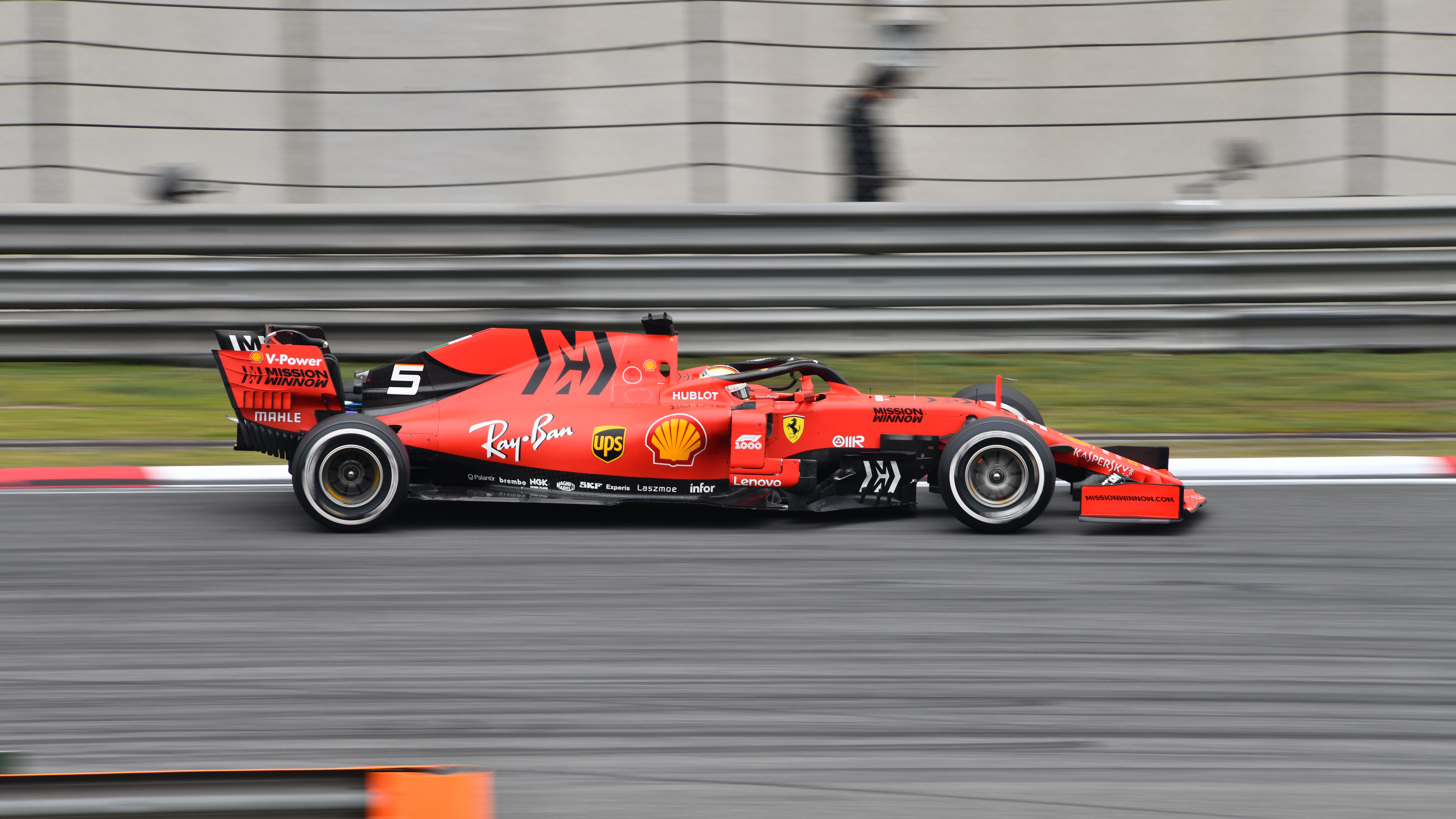
Sebastian Vettel at the 2019 Chinese Grand Prix with the Mission Winnow logo

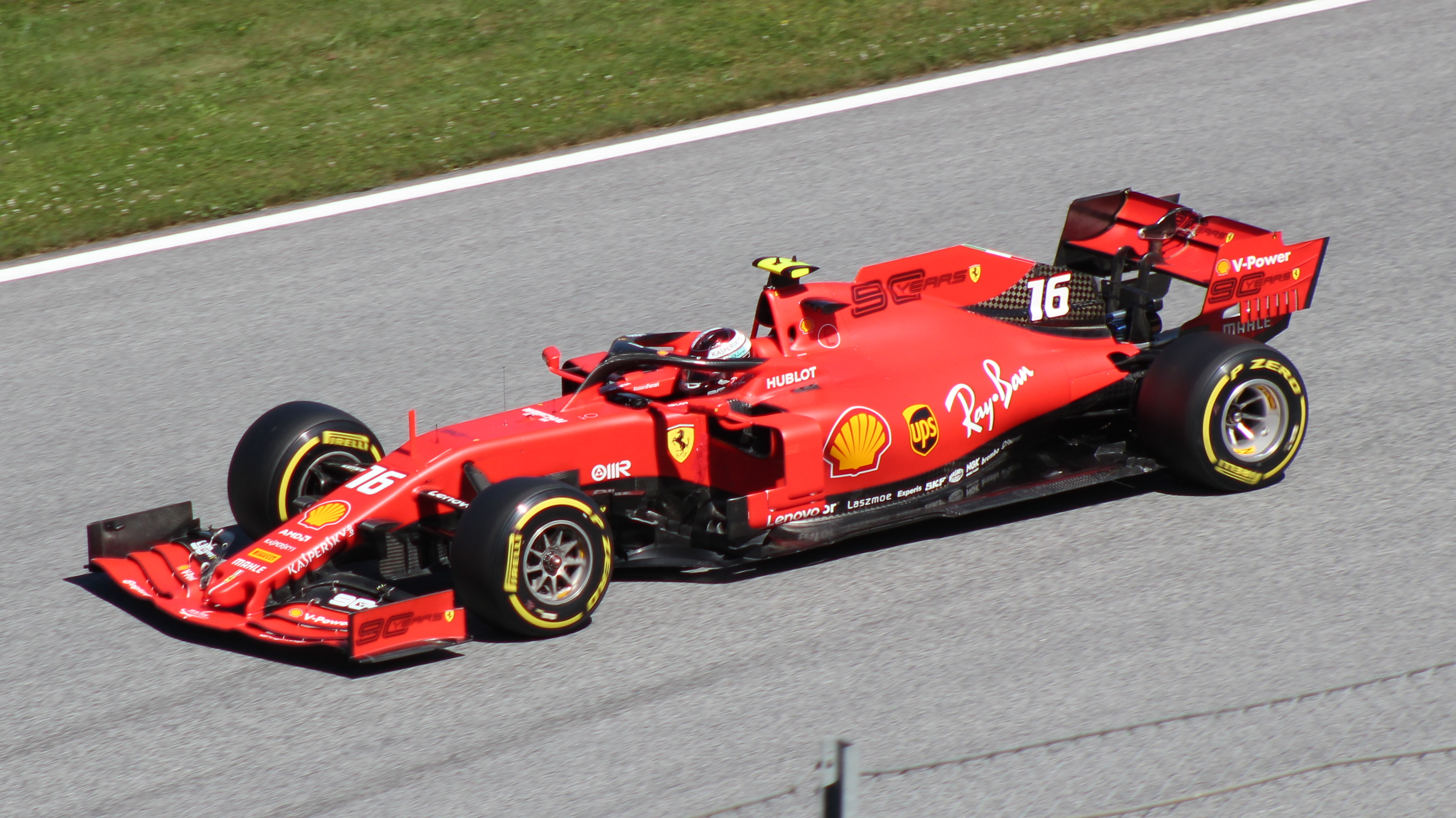
Charles Leclerc at the 2019 Austrian Grand Prix

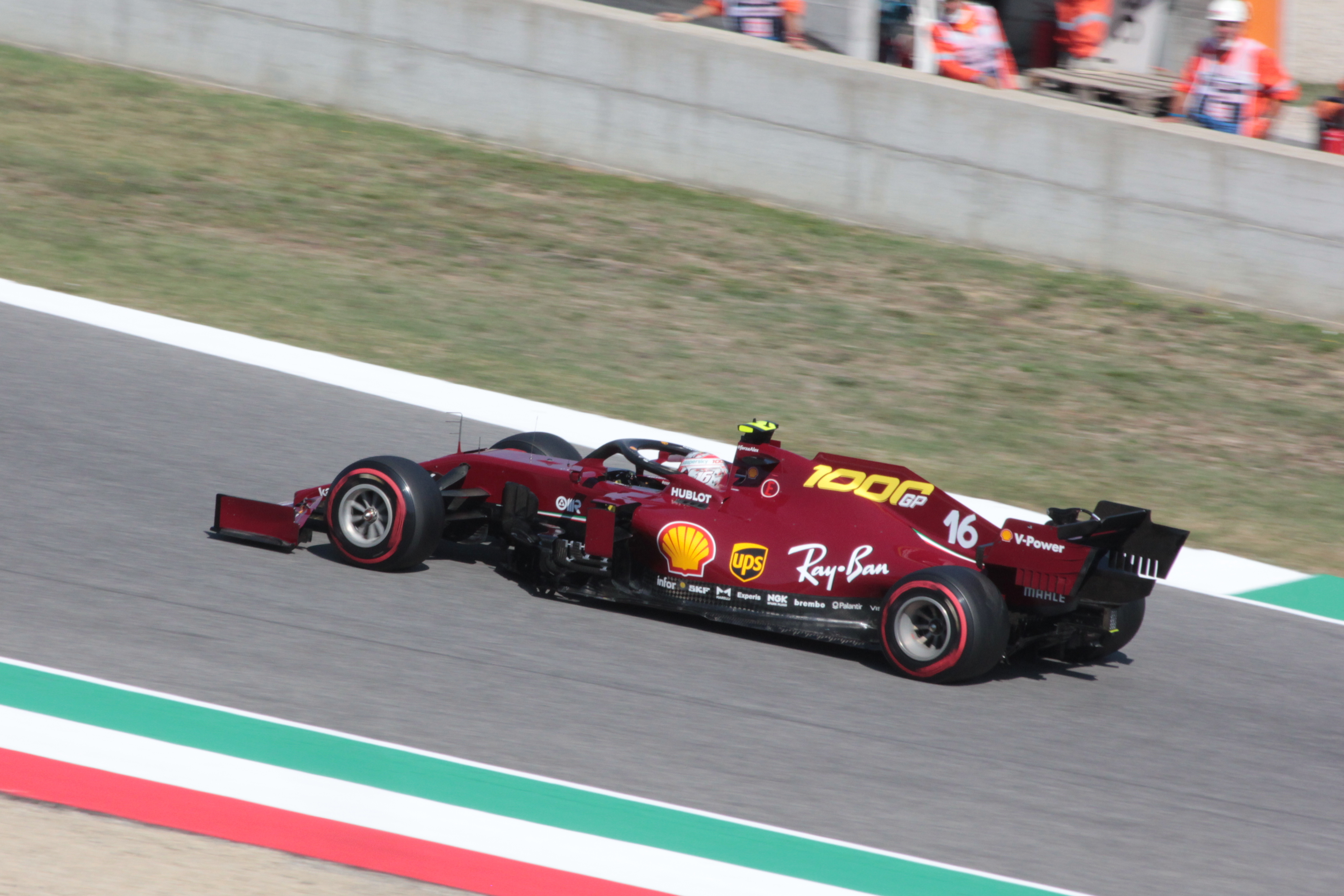
Charles Leclerc at the 2020 Tuscan Grand Prix with the SF1000 logo

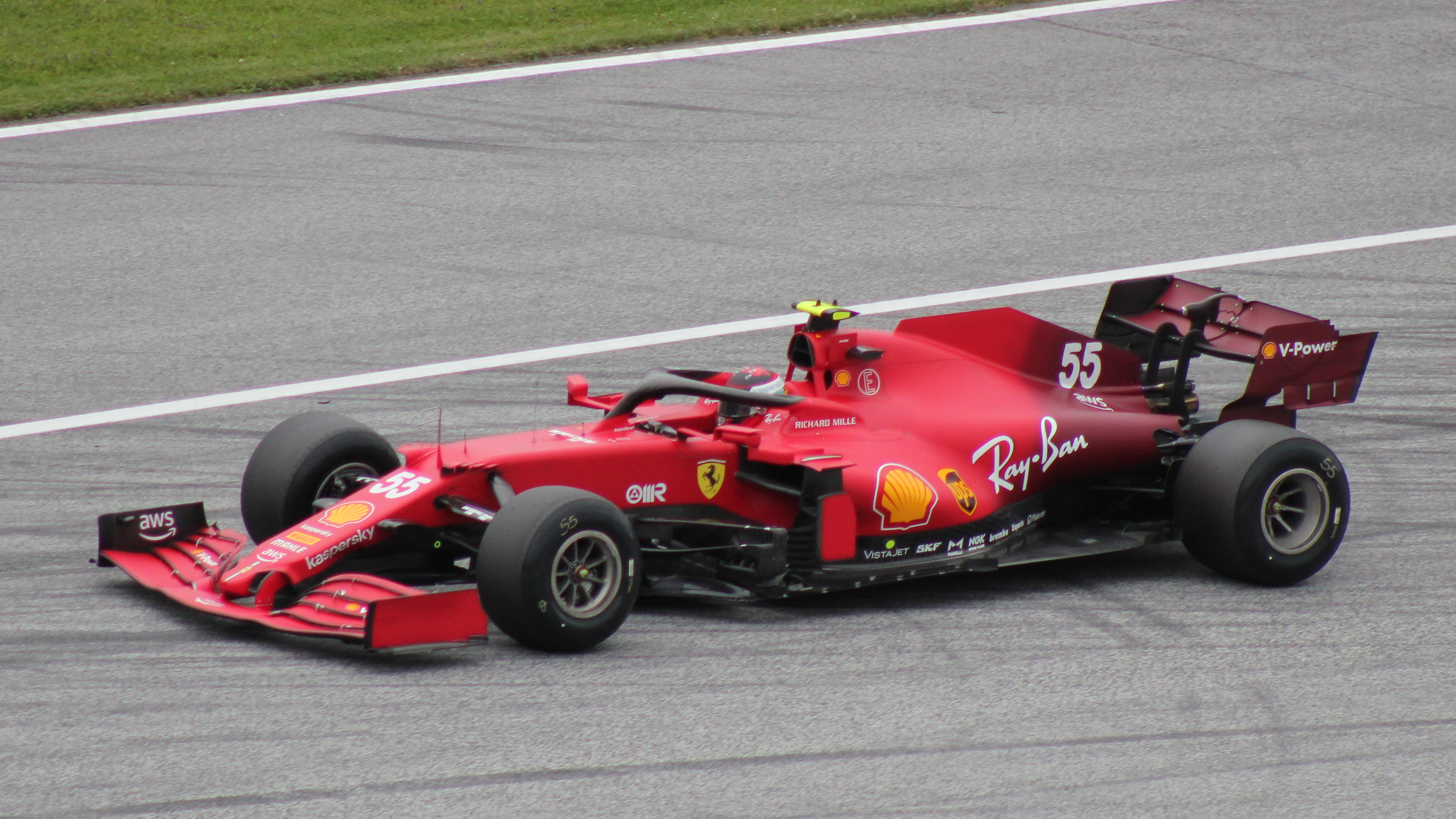
Carlos Sainz Jr. at the 2021 Austrian Grand Prix

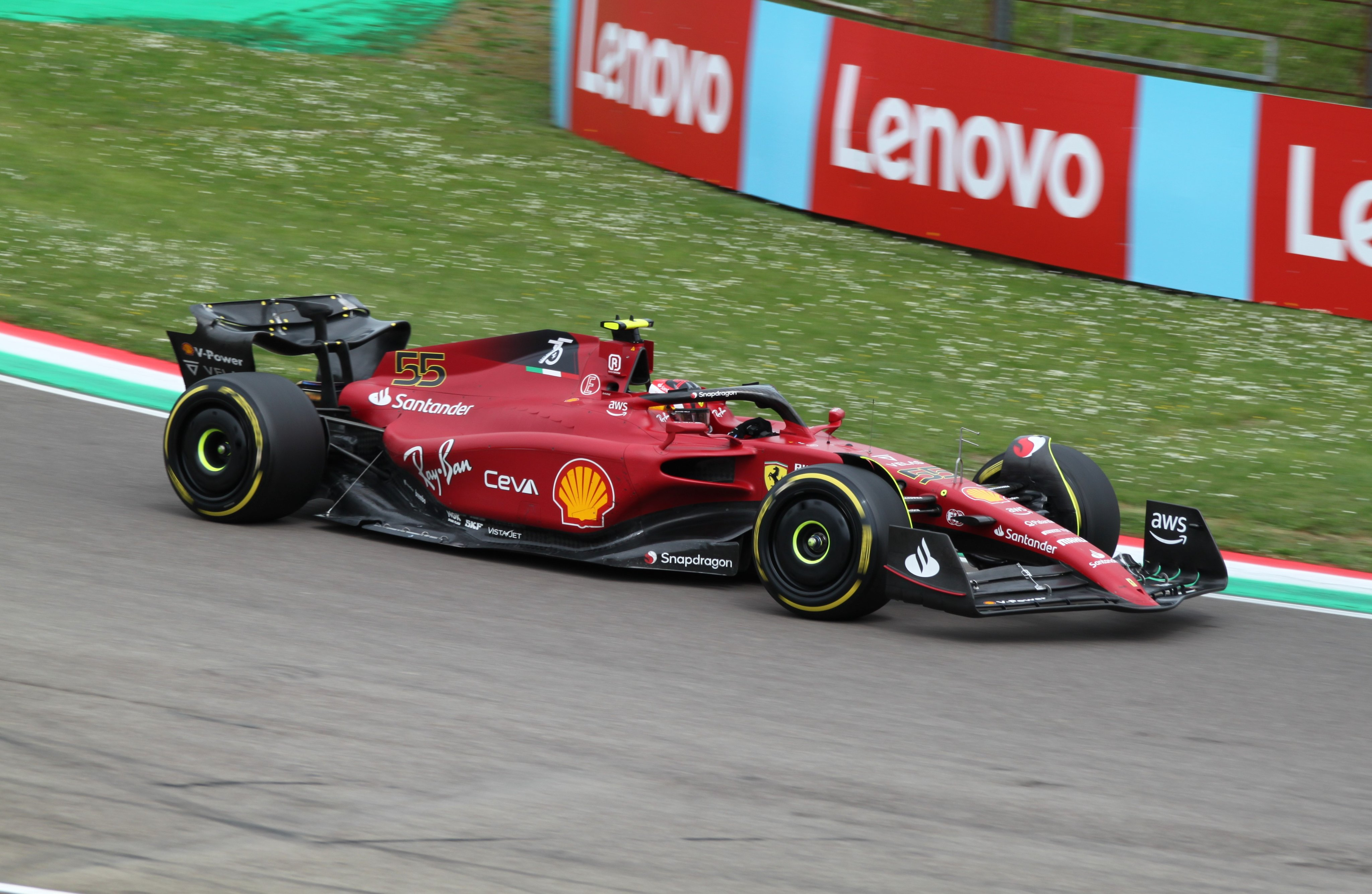
Sainz driving the Ferrari F1-75 at the 2022 Emilia Romagna Grand Prix

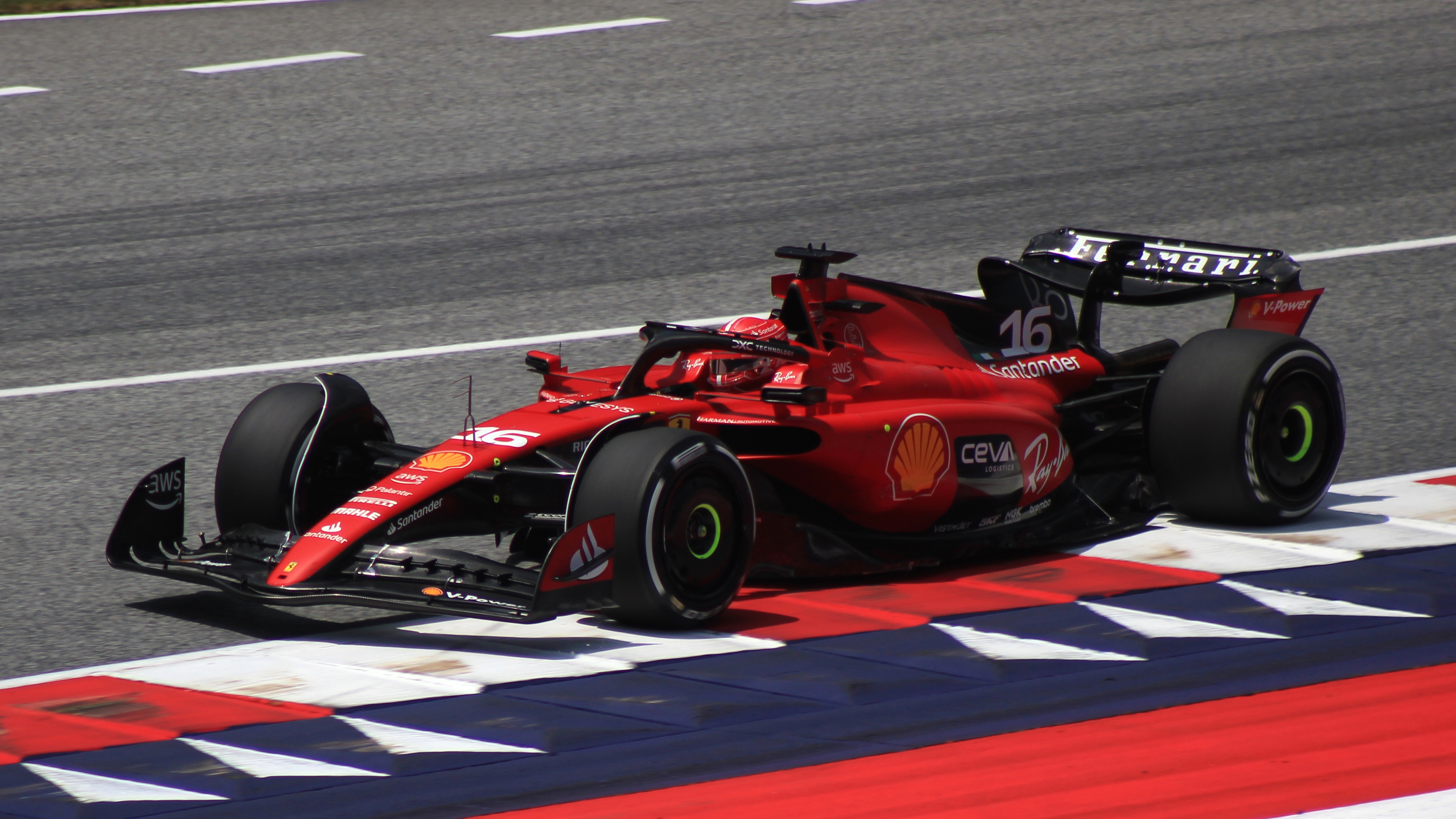
Charles Leclerc driving the Ferrari SF-23 at the 2023 Austrian Grand Prix

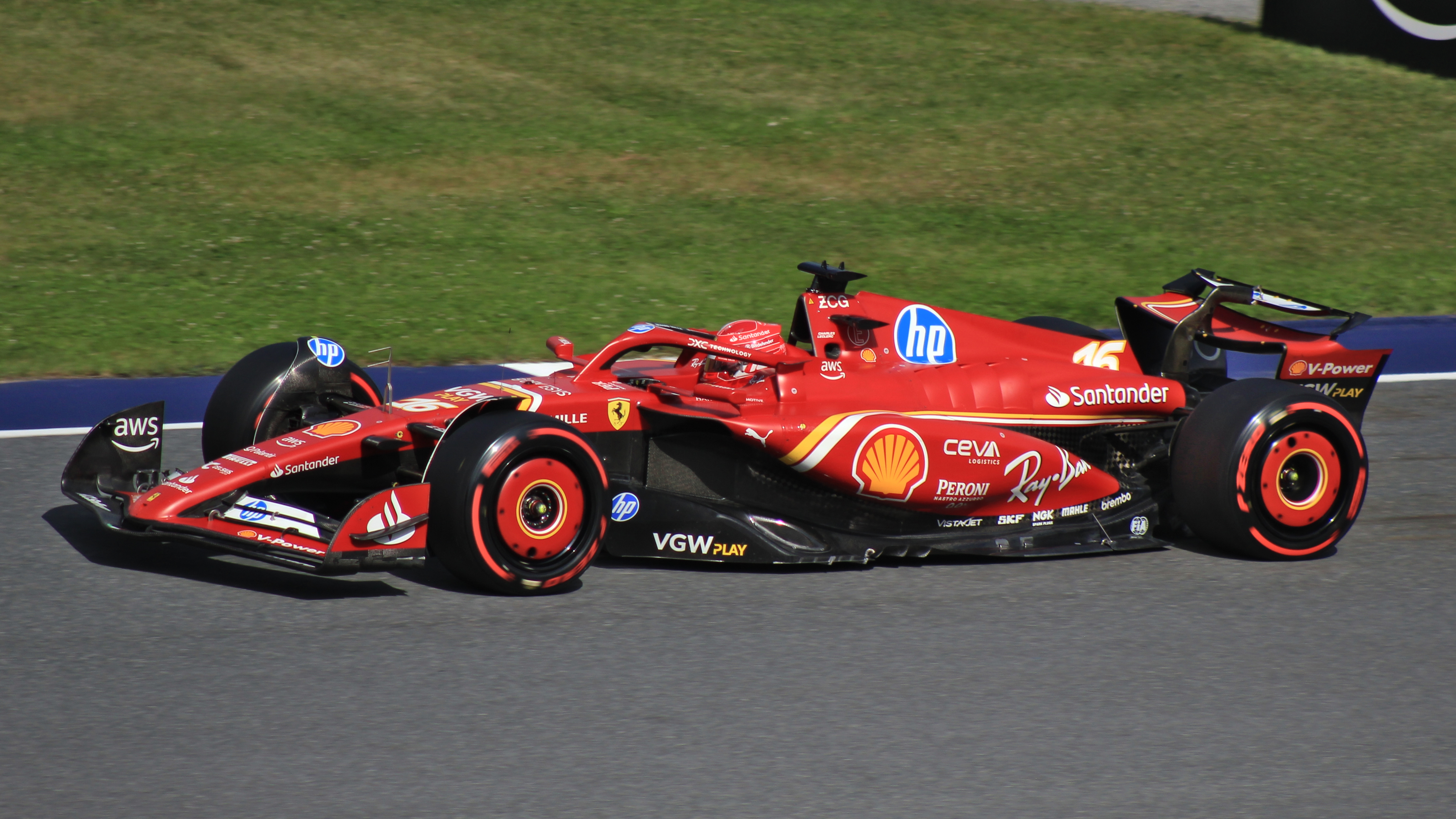
Charles Leclerc driving the Ferrari SF-24 at the 2024 Austrian Grand Prix

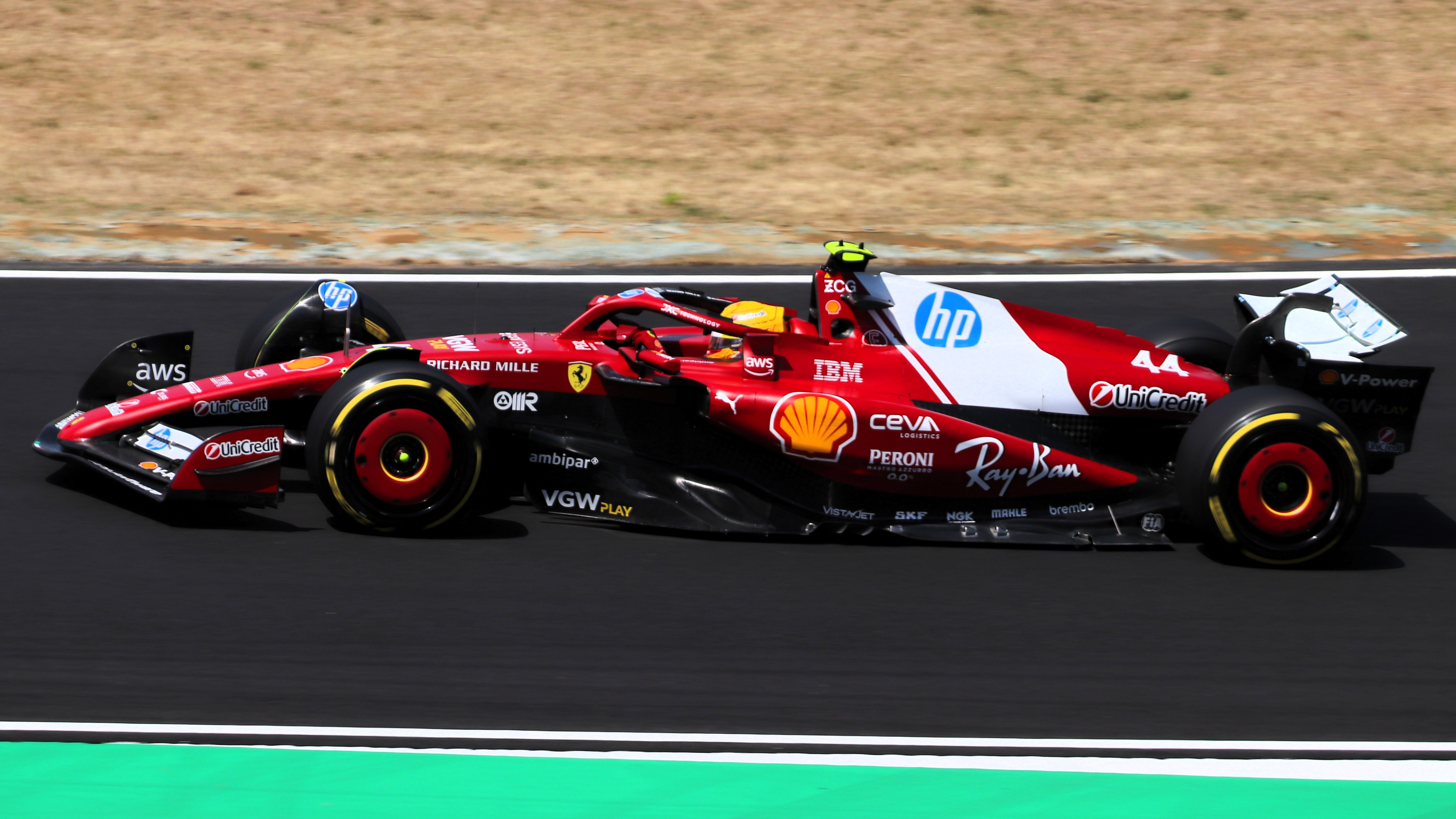
Lewis Hamilton driving the Ferrari SF-25 at the 2025 Japanese Grand Prix

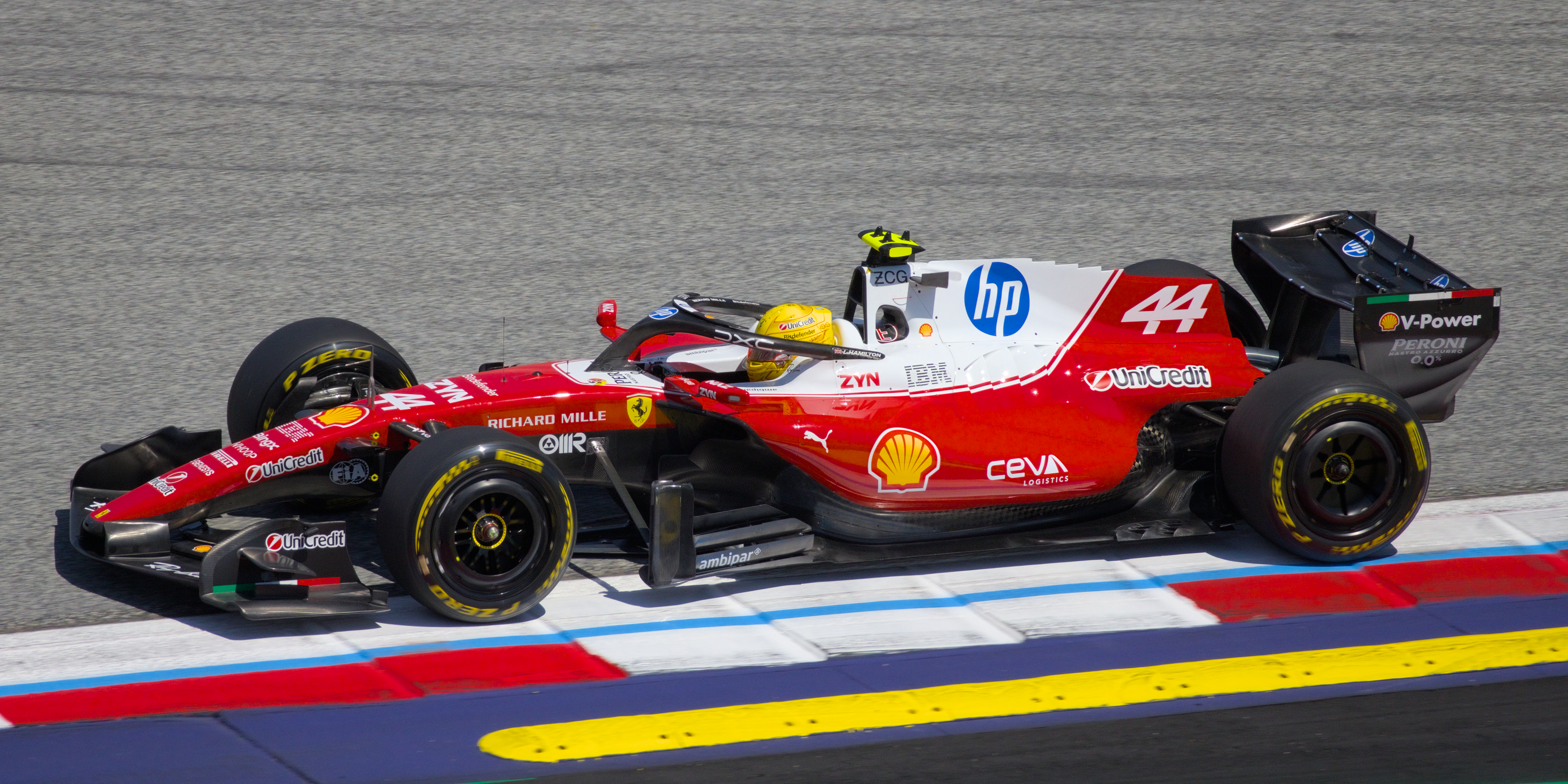
Lewis Hamilton driving the Ferrari SF-26 at the 2026 Austrian Grand Prix

== Fittipaldi ==
Year	Main colour(s)	Additional colour(s)	Main sponsor(s)	Additional major sponsor(s)	Non-tobacco/alcohol livery changes
1975	Silver	Blue, Yellow, Green, Red	Copersucar	Goodyear	
1976	Silver	Blue, White, Green, Red	Copersucar	Goodyear	
1977	Yellow	Blue, White, Green, Red	Copersucar	Goodyear	
1978–1979	Yellow	Rainbow	Copersucar	Goodyear	
1980–1981	Yellow, White	Brown	Skol	Goodyear, Marlboro (1981)	
1982	White	Blue, Red	Sal Cisne, Caloi	Brasilinvest, Petrobras	

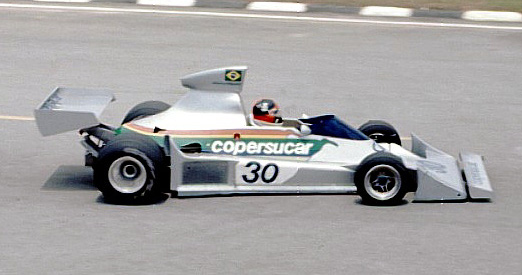
In its first years, Fittipaldi raced with a silver livery with Brazil's national colors, this is Emerson 'Emmo' Fittipaldi driving his FD04

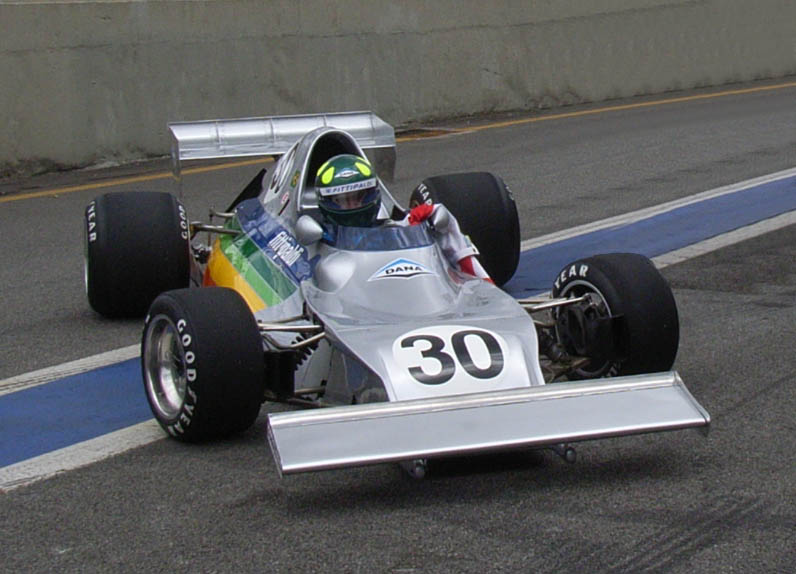
Wilson Fittipaldi driving a Fittipaldi FD01

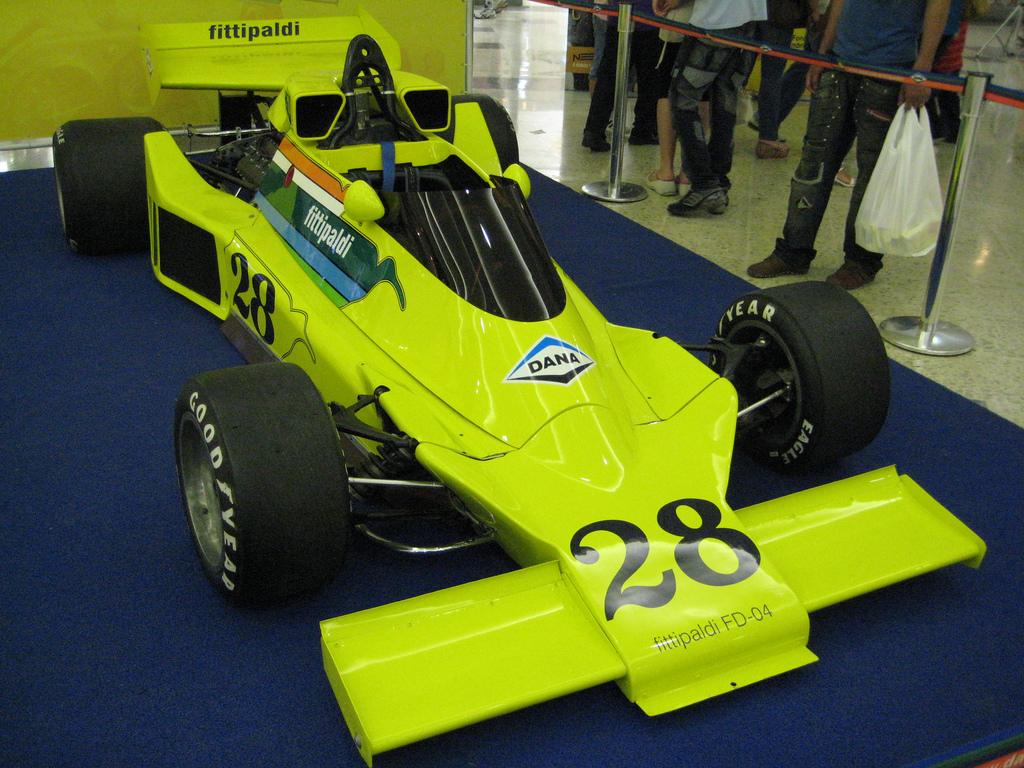
The Fittipaldi FD-04 with a special livery

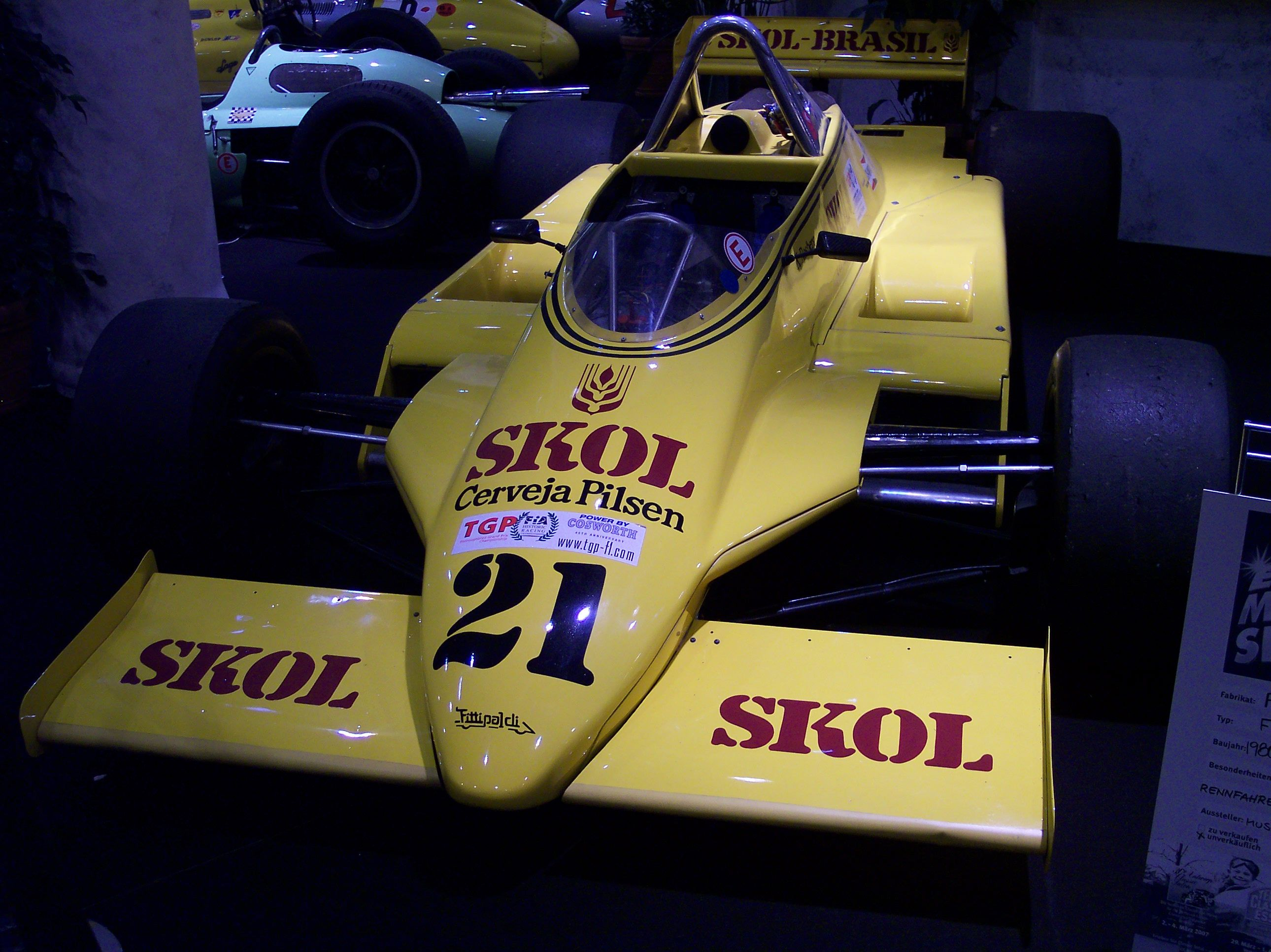
In the 1980s, Fittipaldi gained support from the Brazilian Beer Skol, this is Keke Rosberg's F8

== Fondmetal ==
Year	Main colour(s)	Additional colour(s)	Livery sponsor(s)	Additional major sponsor(s)
1991	Black	White, Red, Yellow	Fondmetal	Agip
1992	Black	Red, White	Fondmetal	LeasePlan, Agip, Foppapedretti, Sgommatutto

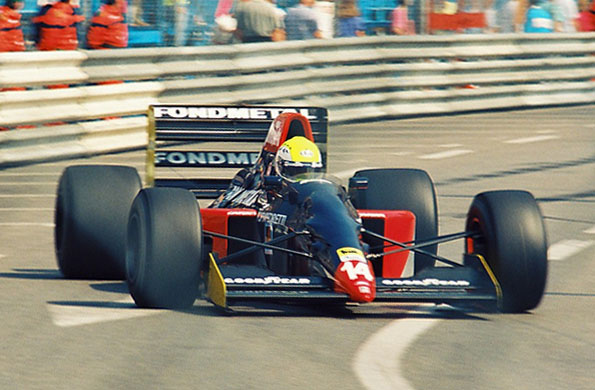
Andrea Chiesa racing for Fondmetal in the 1992 Monaco GP.

== Force India ==
Year	Main colour(s)	Additional colour(s)	Livery sponsor(s)	Additional major sponsor(s)	Non-tobacco/alcohol livery changes
2008	White	Vermillion, Saffron	Kingfisher Airlines	ICICI, Medion, Reliance Industries, Royal Challenge, Bridgestone, Kanyan Capital, AVG, Airbus, Dalmore, Magneti Marelli	
2009	White	Green, Saffron	Kingfisher Airlines	ICICI, Medion, Reliance Industries, Royal Challenge, Whyte & Mackay, Bridgestone, Signature	
2010	White	Green, Orange	Kingfisher Airlines, Whyte & Mackay	Royal Challenge, Medion, Reebok, Bridgestone, Signature	
2011	White, Orange	Green	Kingfisher Airlines, Whyte & Mackay	Medion, Royal Challenge, Reebok, Pirelli, Vladivar, UB	Whyte & Mackay's logo was removed from clothing at the Turkish GP and Whyte & Mackay logo also replaced with "One from a Billion Hunt" in that Grand Prix too. Ra.One was added at the Indian GP. Due to local laws about alcohol sponsorship, the Whyte & Mackay logos were also removed from the car at the Abu Dhabi Grand Prix, and were instead replaced with the names of the winners of a competition run by the team.
2012	White, Orange, Green		Kingfisher, Sahara	Royal Challenge, Reebok, Pirelli, Whyte & Mackay, Vladivar, UB, Aethra	Whyte & Mackay's logo was removed from clothing at the Turkish GP and Whyte & Mackay logo also replaced with "One from a Billion Hunt" in that Grand Prix too. Ra.One was added at the Indian GP. Due to local laws about alcohol sponsorship, the Whyte & Mackay logos were also removed from the car at the Abu Dhabi Grand Prix, and were instead replaced with the names of the winners of a competition run by the team.
2013	White, Orange, Green		Kingfisher, Sahara	Royal Challenge, Reebok, Medion, Pirelli, Whyte & Mackay, Vladivar, UB	Whyte & Mackay's logo was removed from clothing at the Turkish GP and Whyte & Mackay logo also replaced with "One from a Billion Hunt" in that Grand Prix too. Ra.One was added at the Indian GP. Due to local laws about alcohol sponsorship, the Whyte & Mackay logos were also removed from the car at the Abu Dhabi Grand Prix, and were instead replaced with the names of the winners of a competition run by the team.
2014	Black	White, Orange, Green	Kingfisher, Sahara	Royal Challenge, Alpinestars, Pirelli, UB, Claro, Telmex, Telcel, Astana Tourism, Roshfrans, Smirnoff, TW Steel, Varlion, Auden Mckenzie Group, Consorcio Aristos, Ficrea	Smirnoff logo was replaced by the Sahara logo during Abu Dhabi GP.
2015	Black, Silver	Orange, Green	Kingfisher, Sahara	Royal Challenge, Alpinestars, Pirelli, UB, Claro, Telmex, Telcel, NEC, Quaker State, Smirnoff, Univa, Infinitum, Interproteccion, Hype Energy, Consorcio Aristos, Channel It, Skullcandy, Cavall	
2016	Black, Silver	Orange, Green	Kingfisher, Sahara	Smirnoff, Alpinestars, Pirelli, UB, Claro, Telmex, Telcel, NEC, Quaker State, Univa, Infinitum, Interproteccion, Hype Energy, Skullcandy, Banamex, Bonovo, Barbados Tourism, Canal F1 Latin America, Uralchem, Felio Siby	
2017	Pink	Grey, Black, Magenta	Kingfisher, Sahara, BWT	Alpinestars, Pirelli, UB, Claro, Telcel, NEC, Quaker State, Univa, Infinitum, Interproteccion, Johnnie Walker, FXTM, Uralchem, Felio Siby, Hype Energy, Uralkali, Barbados Tourism, Cartesiano Hotels, W66.com, LDNR.bix Eyewear, Sport Bible	
2018	Pink	White, Magenta	Kingfisher, Sahara (Rounds 1–12), BWT	Breast Cancer Care, Claro, DUO, Hype Energy, Infinitum, NEC, Pemex, Telcel, Telmex, Vonhaucke, W66.com, Adaptavist, Alpinestars, Koni, Orange Bus, Pirelli, Ravenol, Univa, 3D Systems, Apsley Tailors, Branded London, Condeco, Farah, Gtechniq, ITEC, SAS Global Communications, Schuberth, STILL, STL Communications, The Roastery at Bella Barista, UPS Direct, VoIP Unlimited, WyndyMilla	

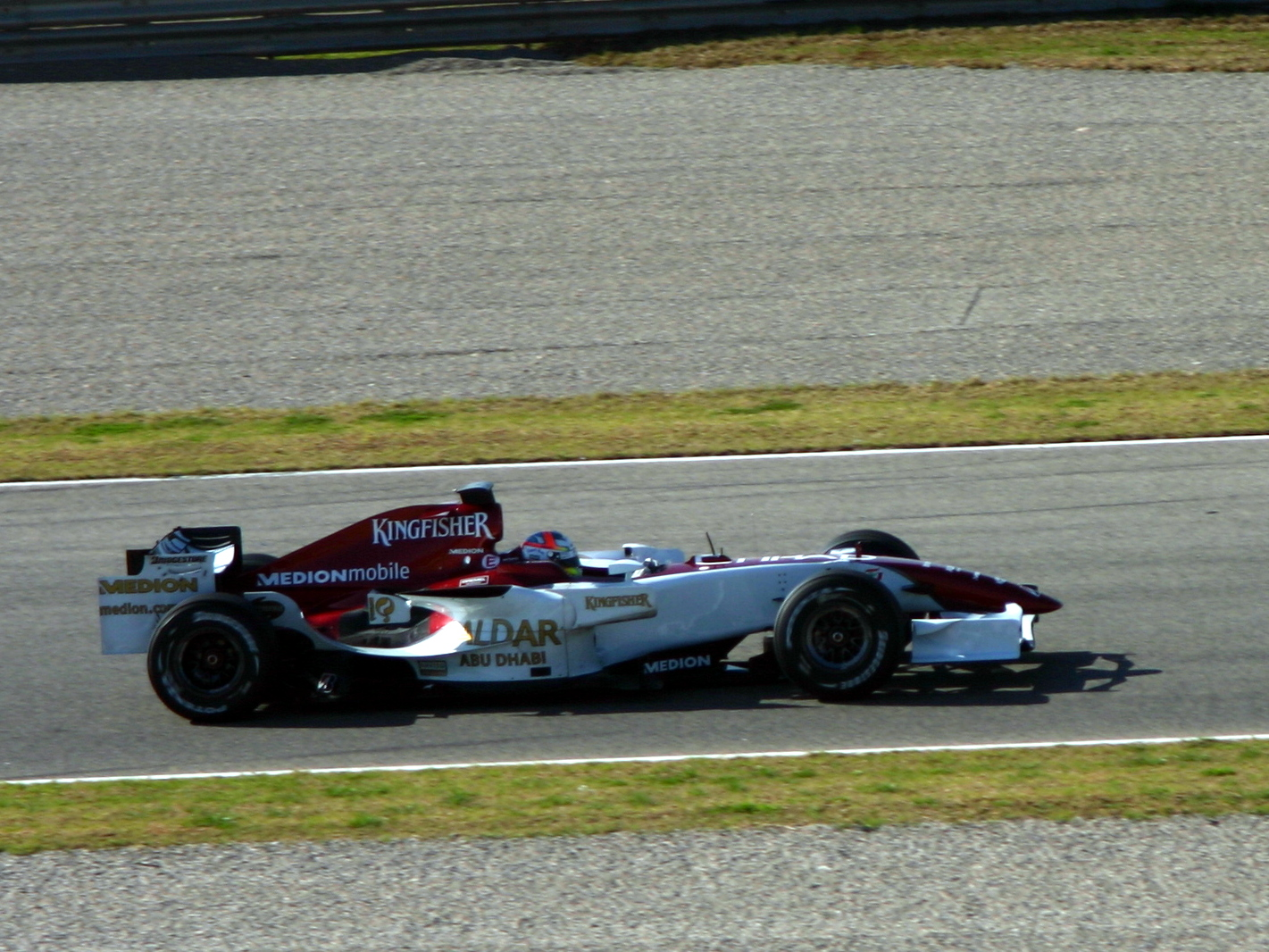
Adrian Sutil testing for Force India in Valencia, January 2008.

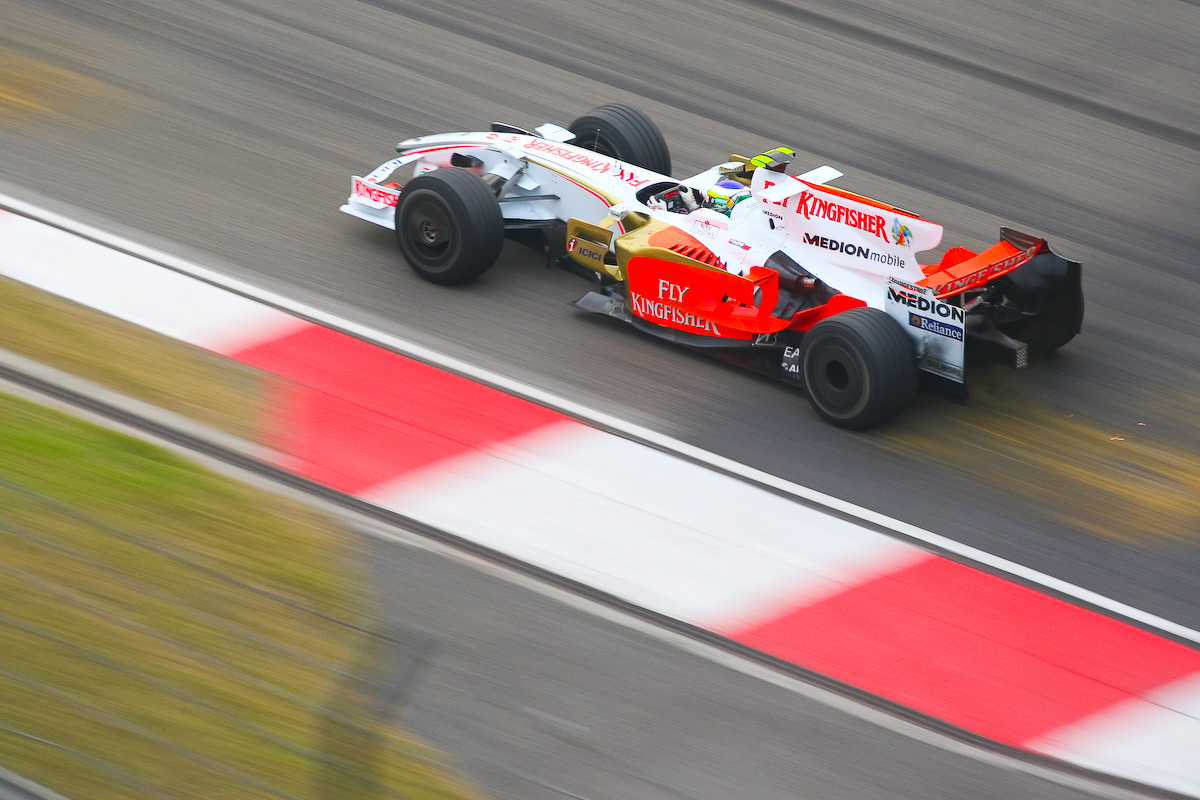
Giancarlo Fisichella driving at the 2008 Chinese Grand Prix. Force India is the fourth different edition of the former Jordan in as many years.

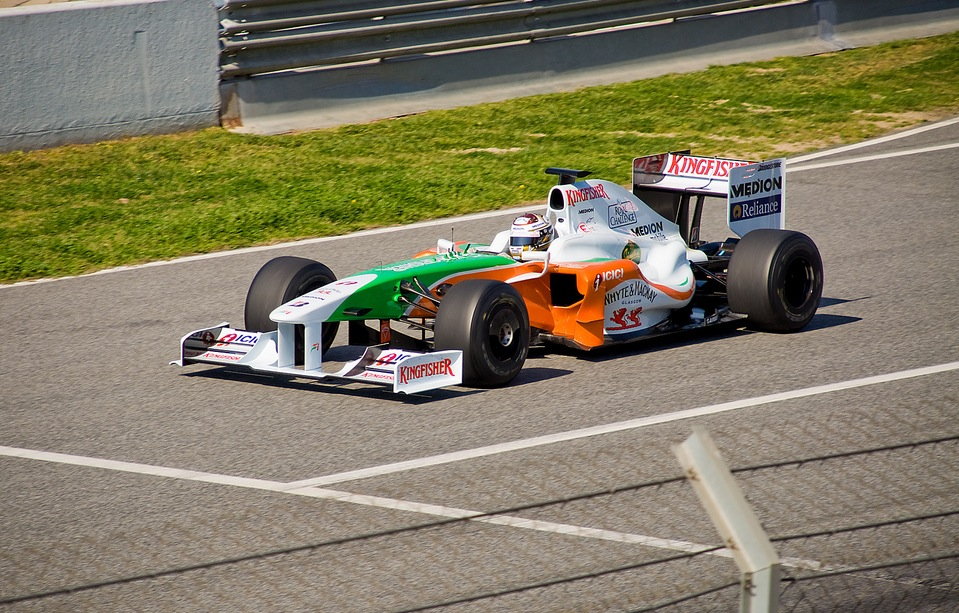
Adrian Sutil testing in Circuit de Catalunya, 2009 with Mercedes engine.

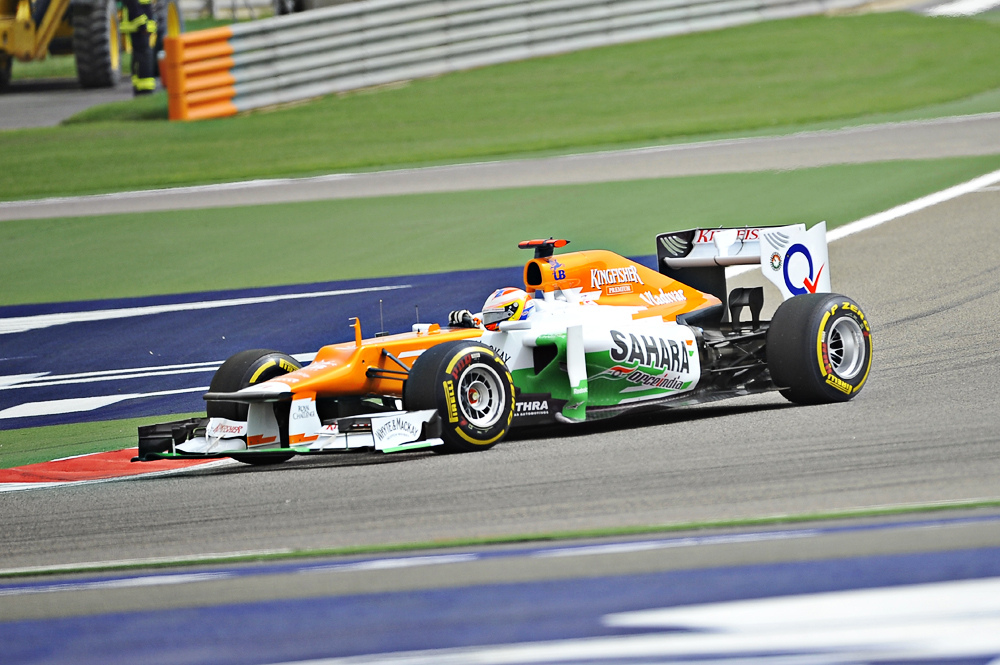
Force India slightly changed its livery for 2012 Formula One season, giving more attention to the colours of title sponsor Sahara India Pariwar. Paul di Resta is pictured while driving at the 2012 Bahrain Grand Prix.

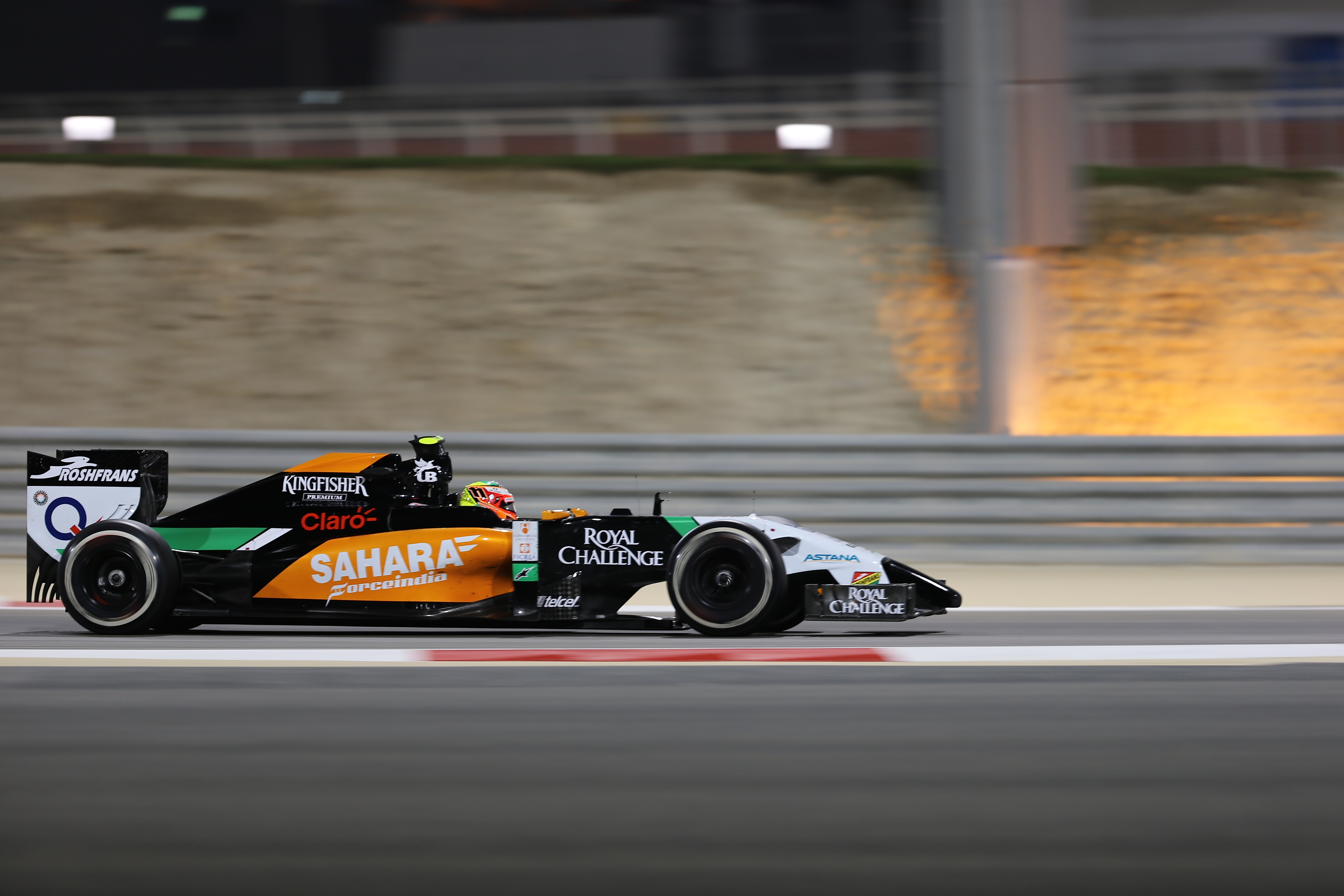
Sergio Pérez drivving the Force India VJM07 at the 2014 Bahrain Grand Prix.

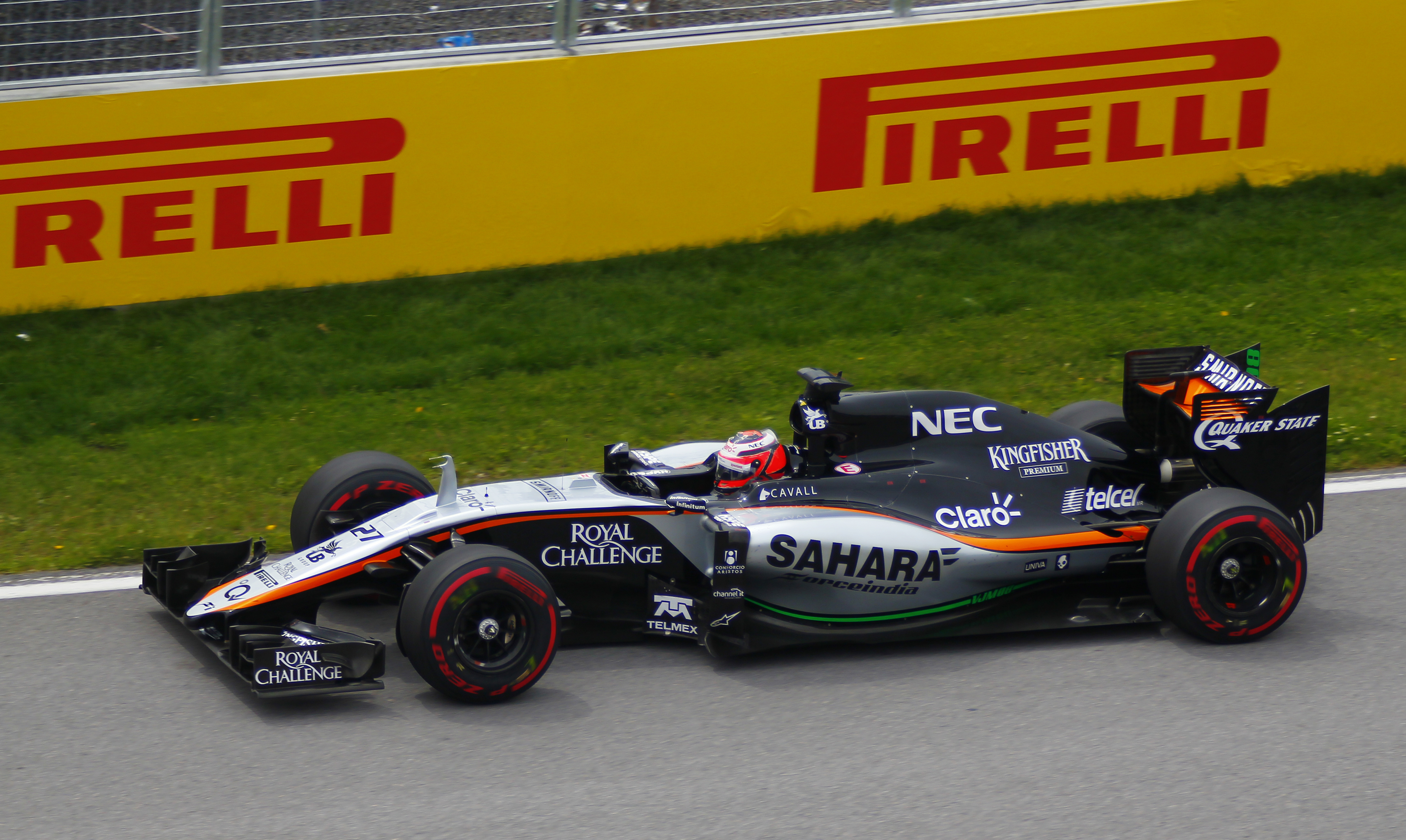
Nico Hülkenberg at the 2015 Canadian Grand Prix.

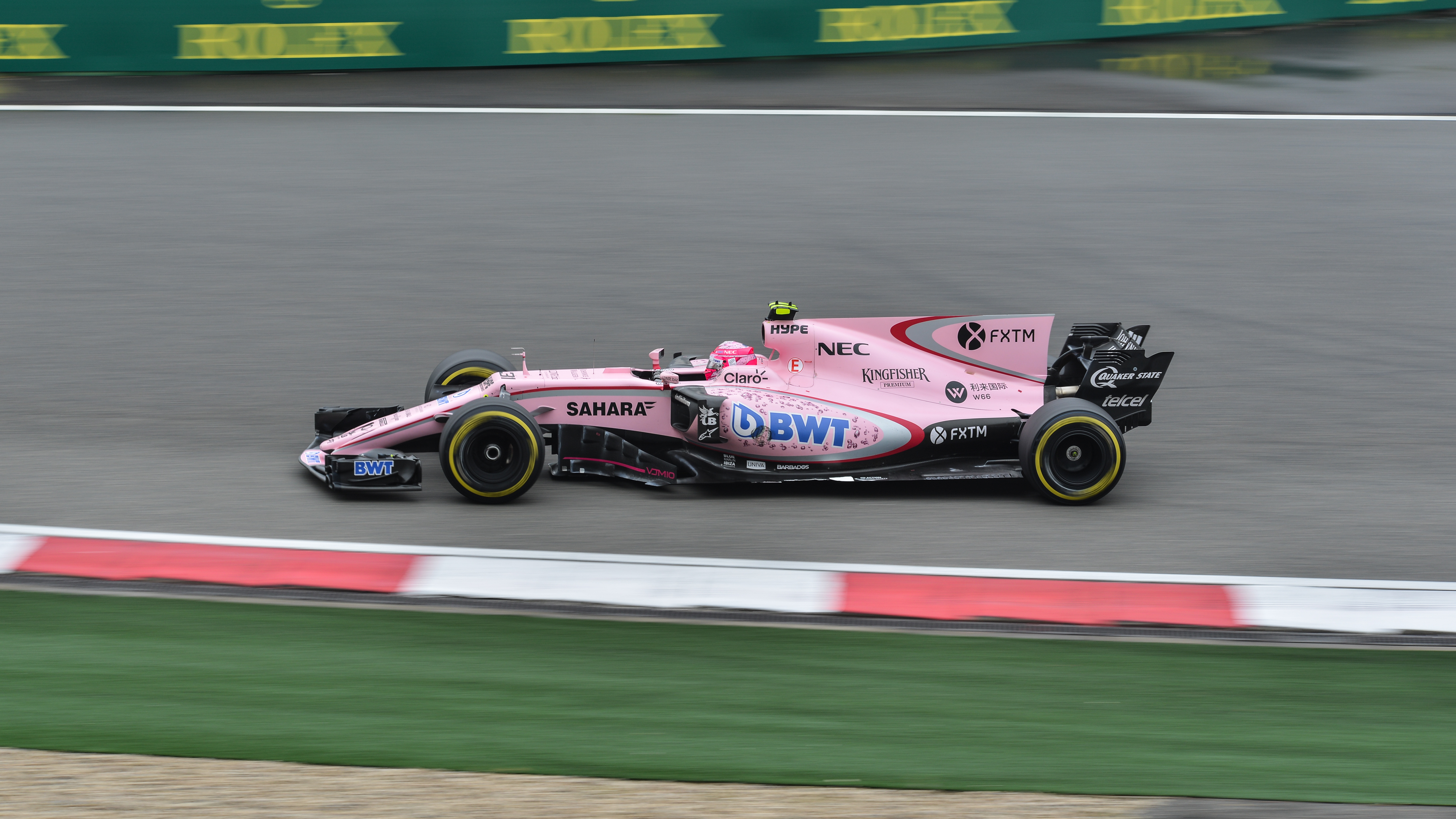
BWT stepped in as title sponsor in 2017; Esteban Ocon at the 2017 Chinese Grand Prix.

== Forti ==
Year	Main colour(s)	Additional colour(s)	Main sponsor(s)	Additional major sponsor(s)	Non-tobacco/alcohol livery changes
1995–1996	Yellow	Blue	Parmalat, Sadia, Arisco,	Marlboro, Duracell, MasterCard, Kaiser, Unibanco, Gillette, Assistalia, Sokol	
1996	Yellow	Blue, Red, Green	Hudson, Forti, Roces, ITS, TAT	Beta Tools, Marlboro, ACI, Lion, Kaiser	
1996 (after Shannon Racing's takeover)	Green	Red, White	Sokol, Shannon, Roces	Beta Tools, Marlboro, ACI, Lion, Kaiser, Fin First group	

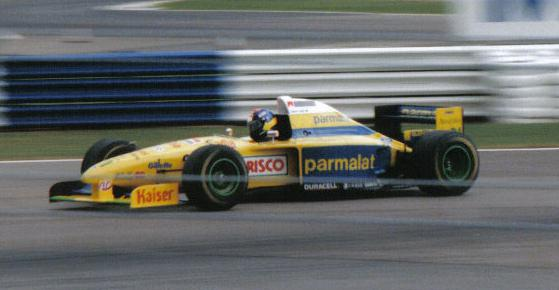
Forti started in 1995 with a yellow Parmalat livery, this is Pedro Diniz driving for Forti at the 1995 British Grand Prix.

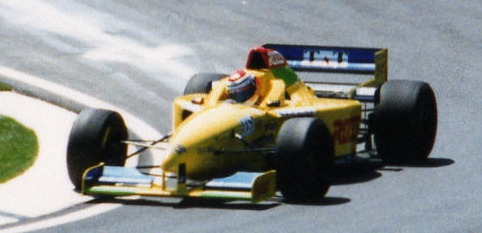
Andrea Montermini driving at the 1996 San Marino Grand Prix.

After Shannon took control of Forti the livery was revised to white and green.

== Frank Williams Racing Cars ==
Year	Main colour(s)	Additional colour(s)	Livery sponsor(s)	Additional major sponsor(s)
1969	Black		Baccara (Spanish Grand Prix only) H.W. Ward & Co. Ltd. (German Grand Prix onwards)	Armstrong, Burmah, Castrol, Dunlop, Girling, Lucas Oil
1970	Red		H.W. Ward & Co. Ltd.	Autolite, BOAC, Borg & Beck, BP, Castrol, Dunlop, Ferodo, Ford, Graviner
1971	Red		Motul	Borg & Beck, Champion, Goodyear, H.W. Ward & Co. Ltd., KONI, Politoys
1972	Blue		Politoys, Motul	Banco Portugues do Brasil S.A., Borg & Beck, Champion, Goodyear, Girling, Personal, Shell
1973	Red and Blue	White	ISO Rivolta, Marlboro	Champion, FINA, Firestone, Personal
1974	Red and Blue	White	ISO Rivolta, Marlboro	Champion, FINA, Firestone, Miller High Life, Personal
1975	White	Red	Ambrozium H7, Chicco, FINA, Marlboro	Bluband, Champion, Chiclets, Heuer, Davos Jakobshorn, Duco, Goodyear, Lavazza, Personal, Richard Oaten Racing, Smarties, Sipuro, Transeuropa, Trident
1976	Black	Gold	Walter Wolf Racing	ABMTM, Champion, FINA, Goodyear, Marlboro, Personal, Richard Oaten Racing

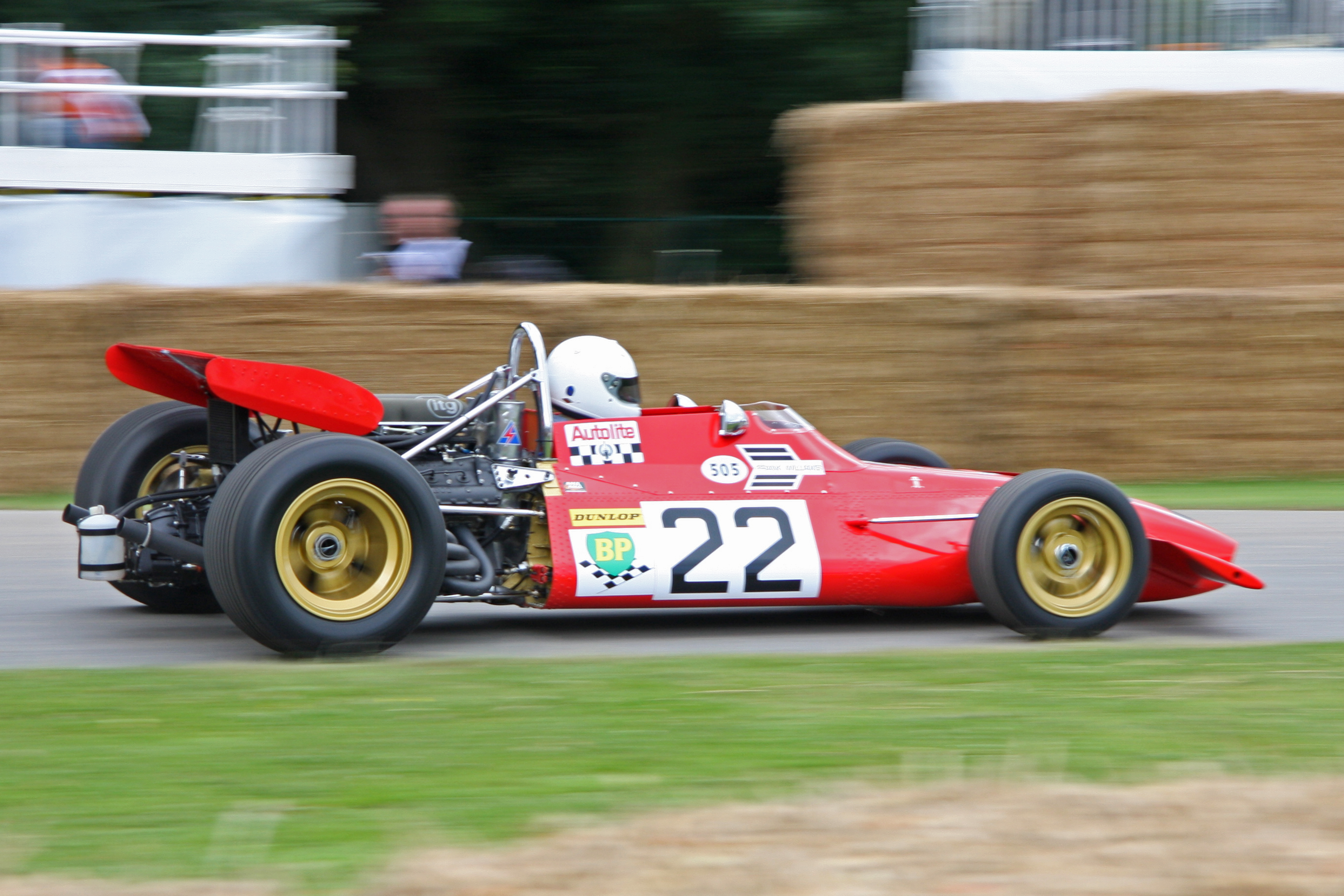
The De Tomaso 505/38, used during the 1970 season, being driven at Goodwood FOS.

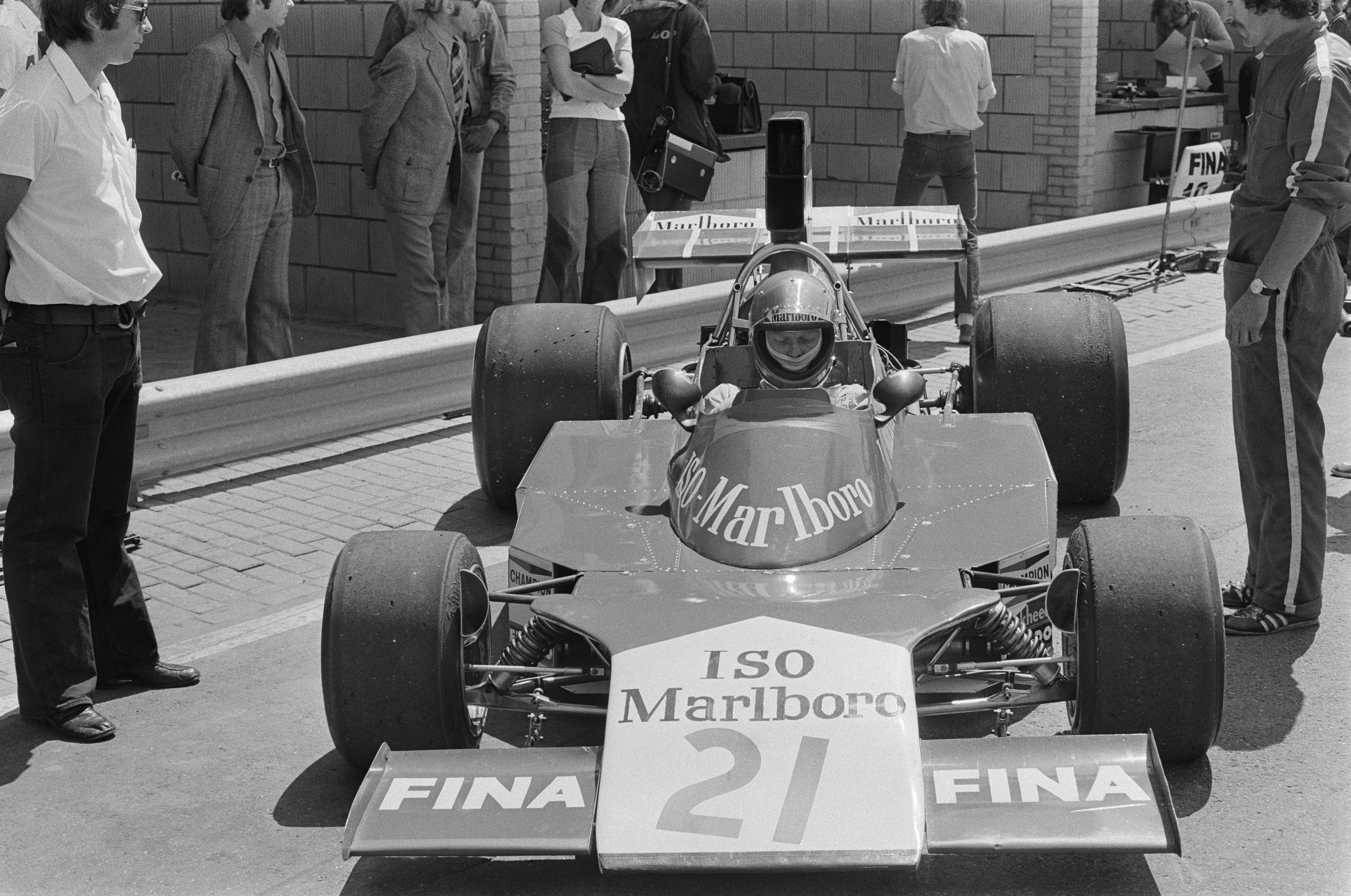
Gijs van Lennep sitting in the Williams FW at the 1974 Dutch Grand Prix.

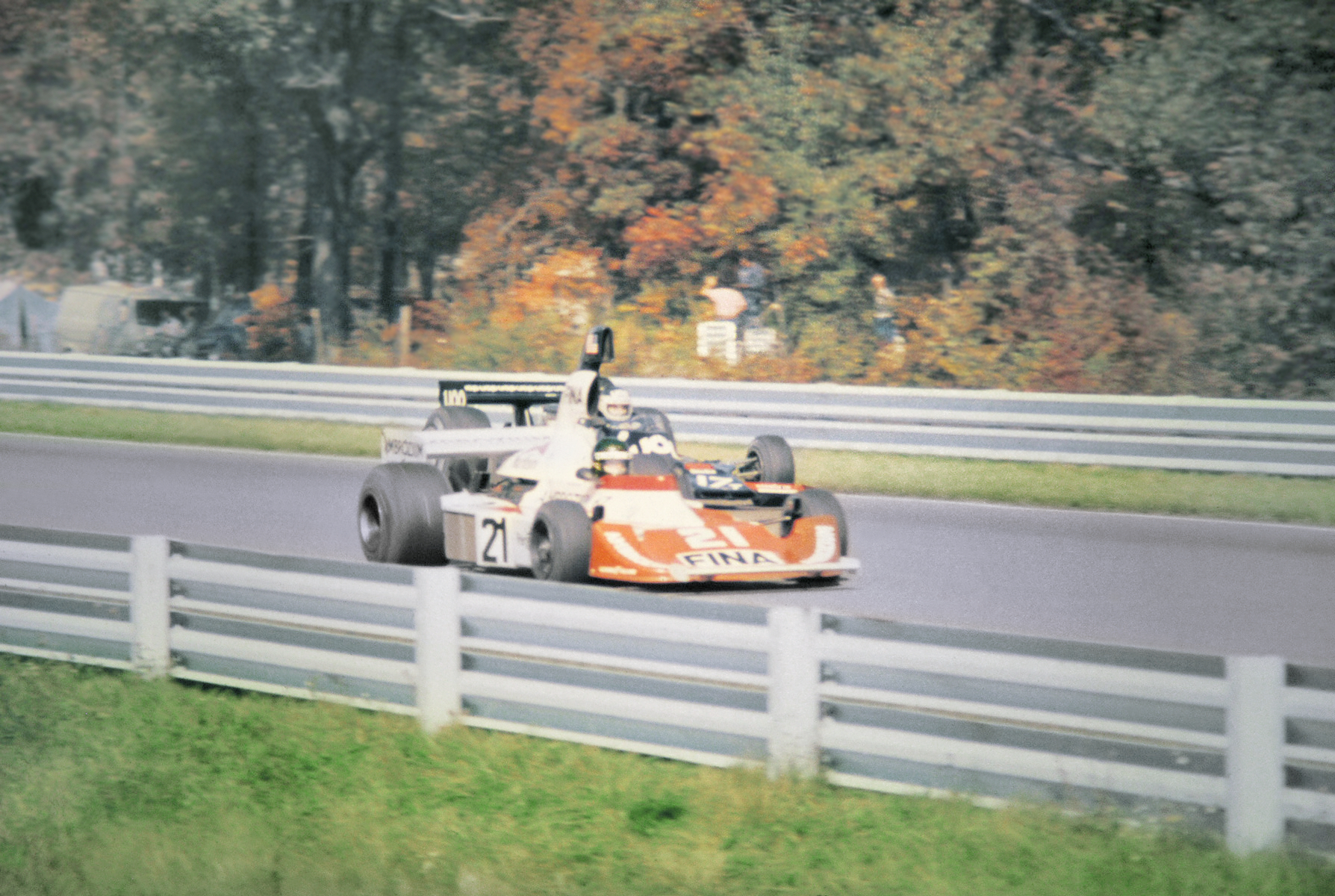
Jacques Laffite driving the Williams FW04 at the 1975 United States Grand Prix.

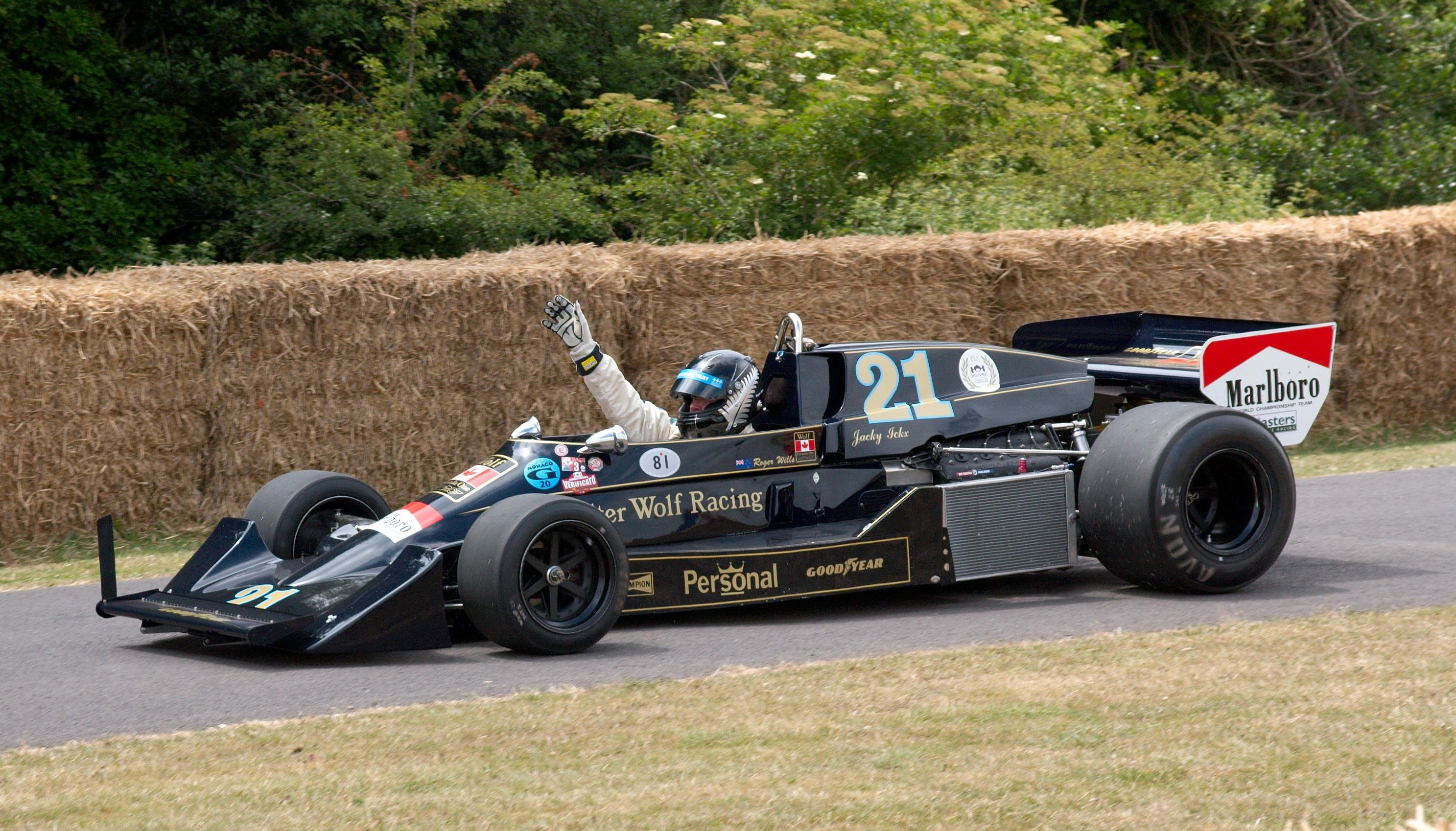
The Hesketh 308C, used during the 1976 season, being driven at Goodwood FOS.

== Haas ==
Haas entered Formula One in 2016.

Year	Main colour(s)	Additional colour(s)	Livery sponsor(s)	Additional major sponsor(s)	Notes
2016	White, Black	Dark Grey, Red	Haas Automation	Alpinestars, Pirelli, Richard Mille, Telcel	
2017	Dark Grey, Black	Red (Australia to Spain)	Haas Automation	Alpinestars, Pirelli, Richard Mille, Wind Shear	
2017	Dark Grey, Black	White (Monaco to Abu Dhabi)	Haas Automation	Alpinestars, Pirelli, Richard Mille, Wind Shear	
2018	Black, White	Grey, Red	Haas Automation	Alpinestars, Pirelli, Richard Mille, Wind Shear, Jack & Jones	
2019	Black	Gold	Haas Automation, Rich Energy	Alpinestars, PEAK, Pirelli, Richard Mille, Jack & Jones, Wind Shear	Rich Energy was the team's title and livery sponsor up to the Italian Grand Prix.
2020	Silver, Black	Red	Haas Automation	Alpinestars, PEAK, Pirelli, Richard Mille, Jack & Jones, Wind Shear	
2021	White	Red, Blue	Haas Automation, Uralkali	Alpinestars, 1&1 Ionos, Pirelli, Under Armour	
2022	White	Red, Black	Haas Automation	Alpinestars, 1&1 Ionos, Pirelli, Under Armour, Tricorp Workwear, CYRUS Genève, TransferMate, Lunar, Hantec Markets, MoneyGram	The team originally launched with Uralkali as its title sponsor along with the Russian flag colors on its livery. It was soon removed as a result of the Russian invasion of Ukraine. The first two days of pre-season testing featured this livery, it would be removed on the final day; this livery would be used throughout the season.
2023–2024	Black	White, Red	Haas Automation, MoneyGram	Chipotle Mexican Grill, Alpinestars, Pirelli, Lunar, Oakberry, Tricorp Workwear, Palm Angels, OpenSea, Hantec Markets, Schuberth, MGM Resorts International, SafetyCulture, Play’n GO, Toyota Gazoo Racing (2024), UChicago Medicine (2024), Mercari (2024), Orion180 (2024)	In 2024, the three United States races were also sponsored by Mercari, the Atlus video game Metaphor: ReFantazio was featured on the car at the Singapore Grand Prix, and Haas raced a special livery for the United States Grand Prix, featuring a stars and stripes design down the sidepods, tub and both rear and front wing endplates.
2025	Black, White	Red	Haas Automation, MoneyGram	Pirelli, Alpinestars, TravisMathew, MGM Resorts International (Bellagio), Play’n GO, Toyota Gazoo Racing, UChicago Medicine, Orion180, Mphasis, Zoomex, Infobip, Tricorp Workwear	For the Japanese Grand Prix, Haas launched a special livery paying homage to the cherry blossom season in Japan. The team raced a livery that paid homage to their debut season livery at the Canadian Grand Prix. Later, at the United States Grand Prix, Haas made another special livery, celebrating their return to the team's home country with a star-studded livery, their second home livery in a row.
2026	White	Red, Black	Haas Automation, Toyota Gazoo Racing	Pirelli, Alpinestars, TravisMathew, Castore, Play’n GO, UChicago Medicine, Orion180, Mphasis, Zoomex, Infobip, IC, CommScope, Ruckus, Singha, Vellamo Water, Fix Network, Godzilla, Emburse, NeverMile, D.ENERGY, Bradesco	For signing a season-long collaboration deal with Toho, Haas raced a Godzilla-themed livery for the Japanese and United States Grands Prix. The latter livery was used to promote Godzilla Minus Zero.

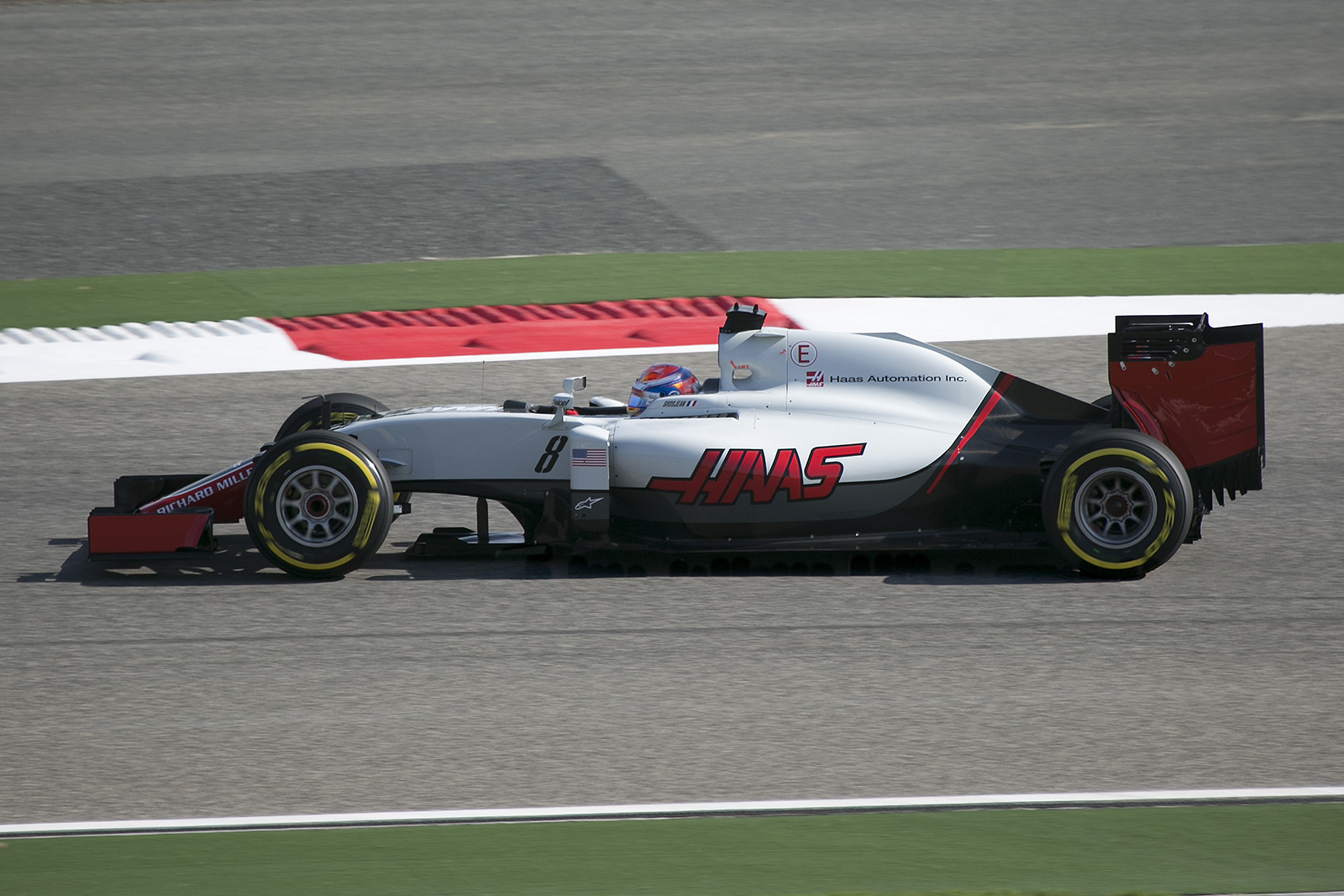
Romain Grosjean driving the Haas VF-16 at the 2016 Bahrain Grand Prix

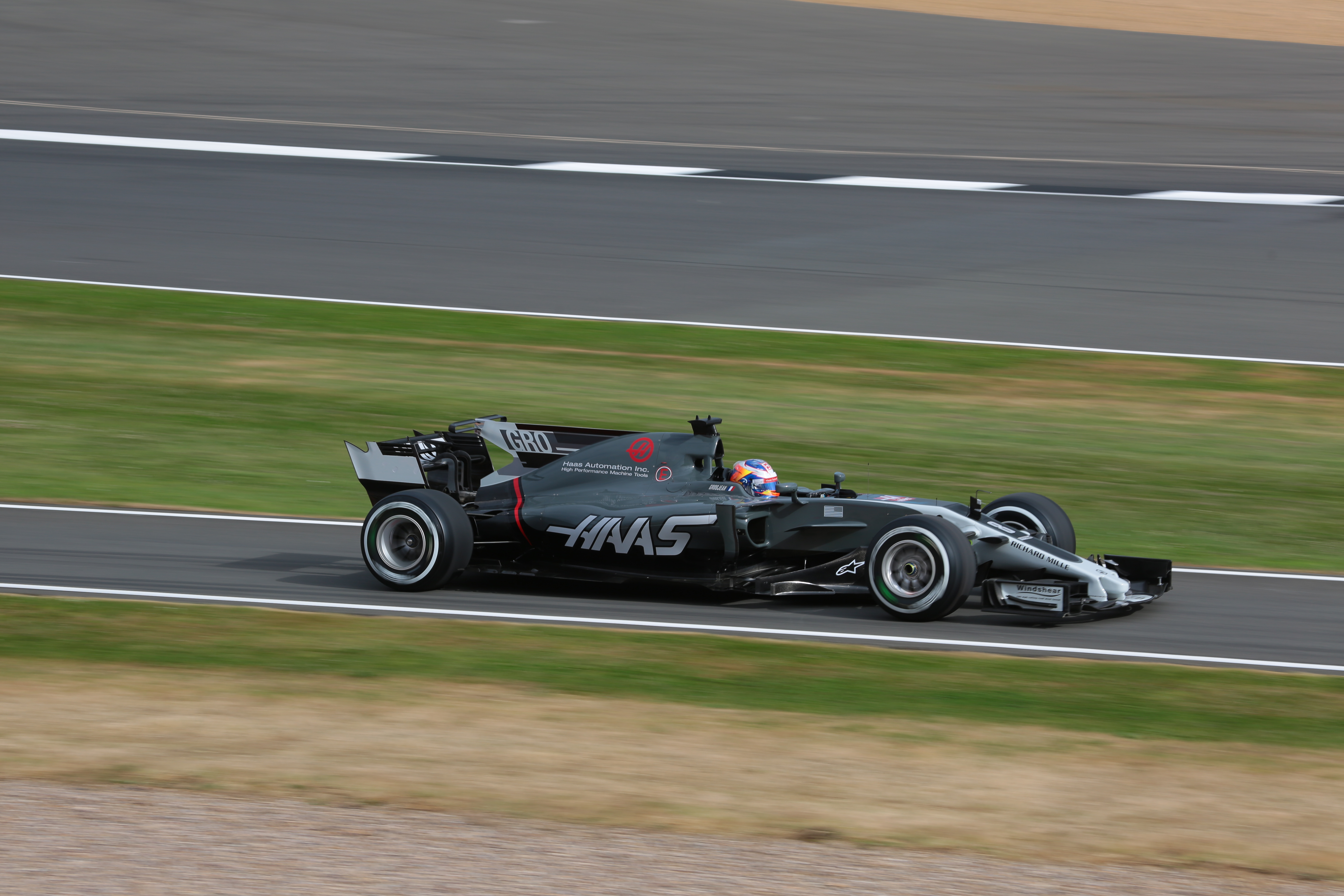
Romain Grosjean driving the Haas VF-17 at the 2017 British Grand Prix

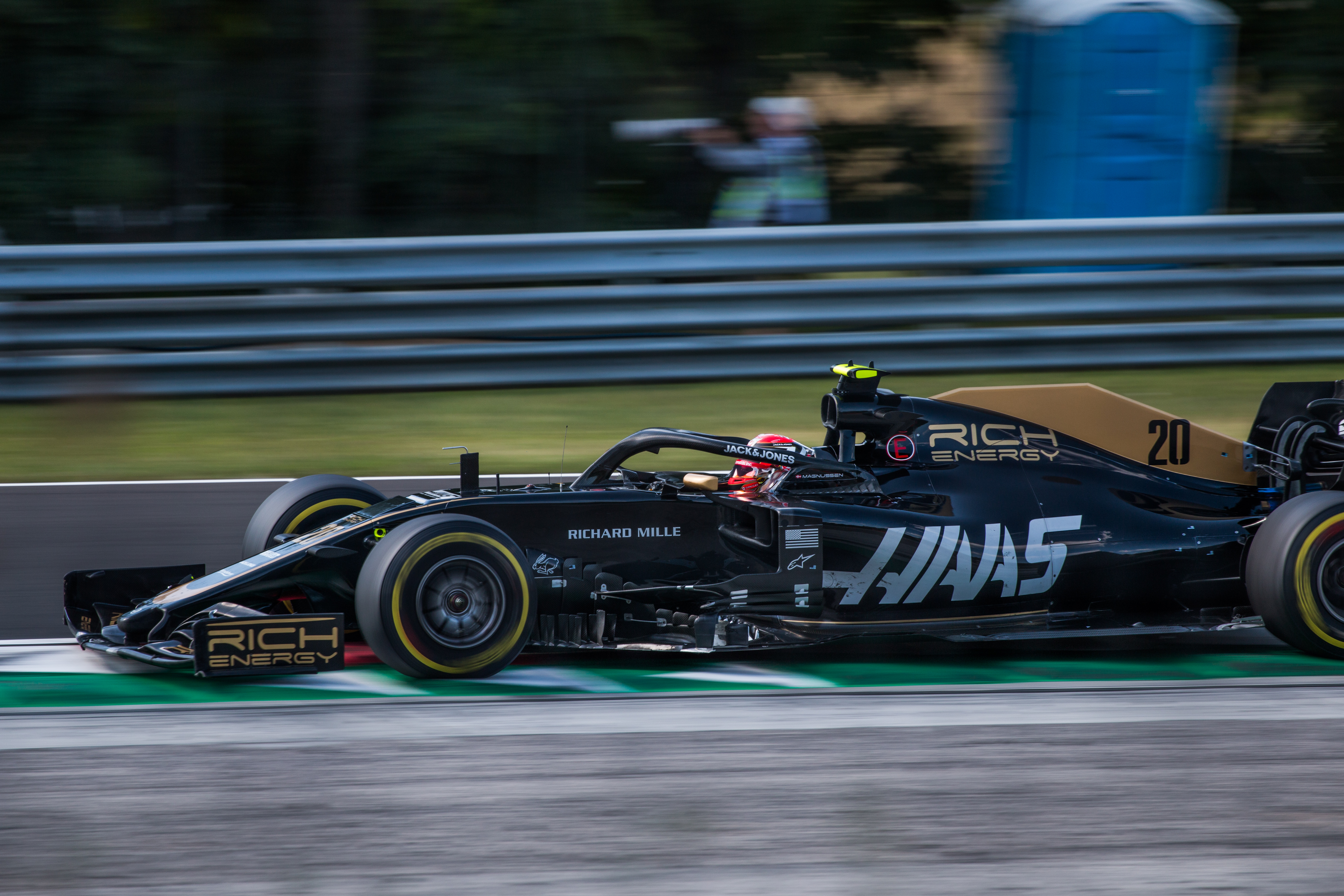
Kevin Magnussen driving the Haas VF-19 at the 2019 Hungarian Grand Prix

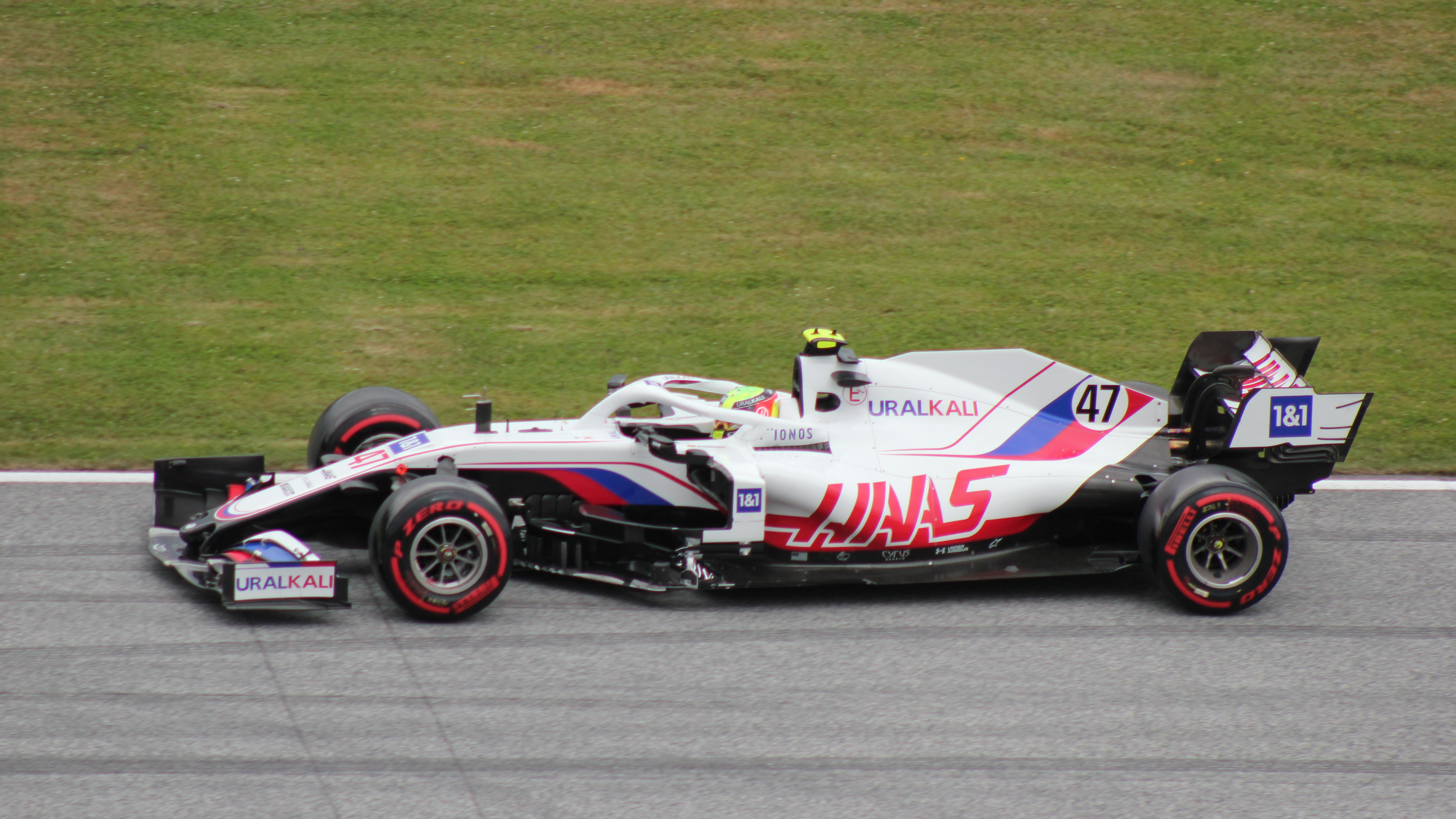
Mick Schumacher driving the Haas VF-21 at the 2021 Austrian Grand Prix

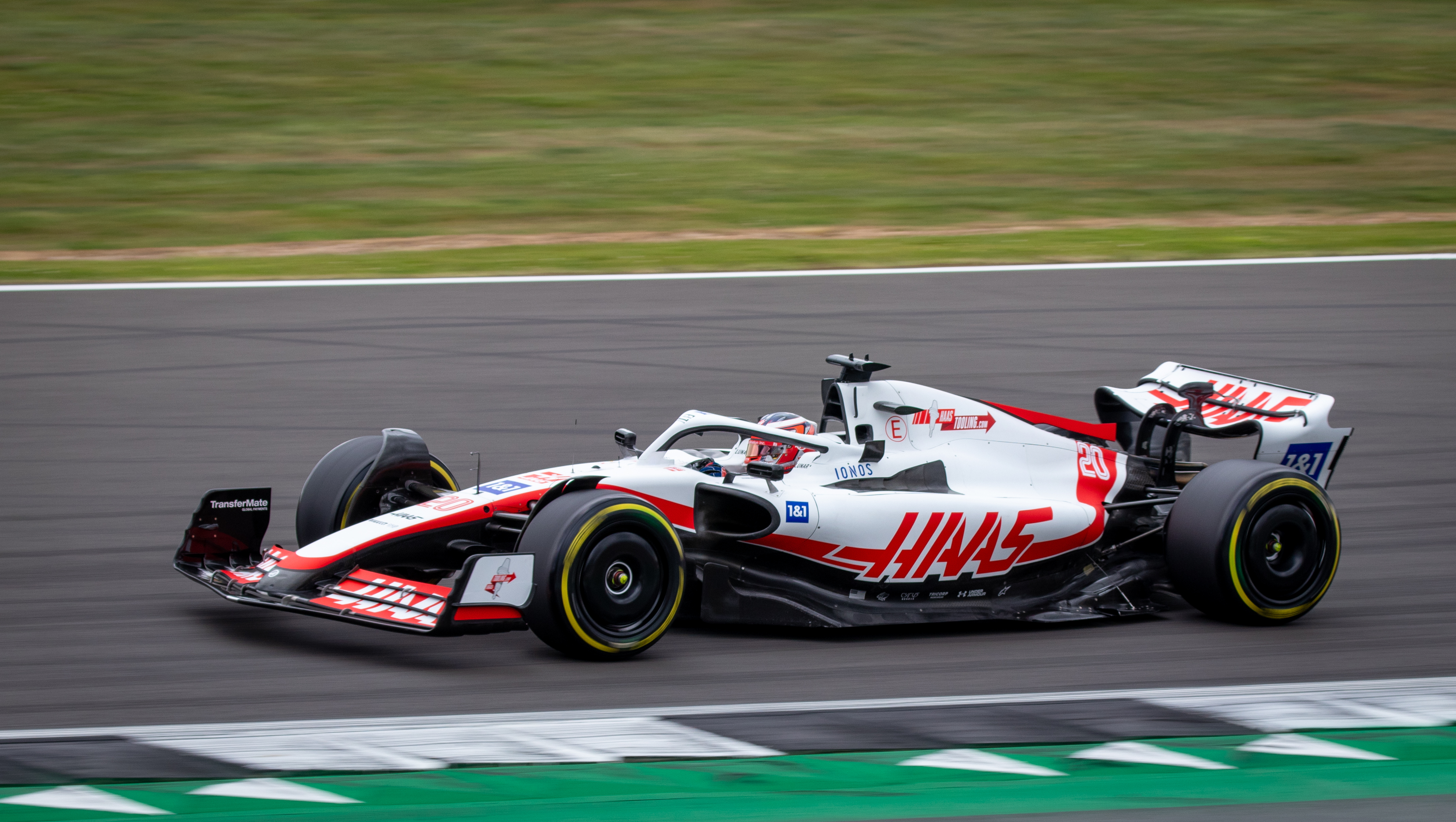
Kevin Magnussen driving the Haas VF-22 at the 2022 British Grand Prix

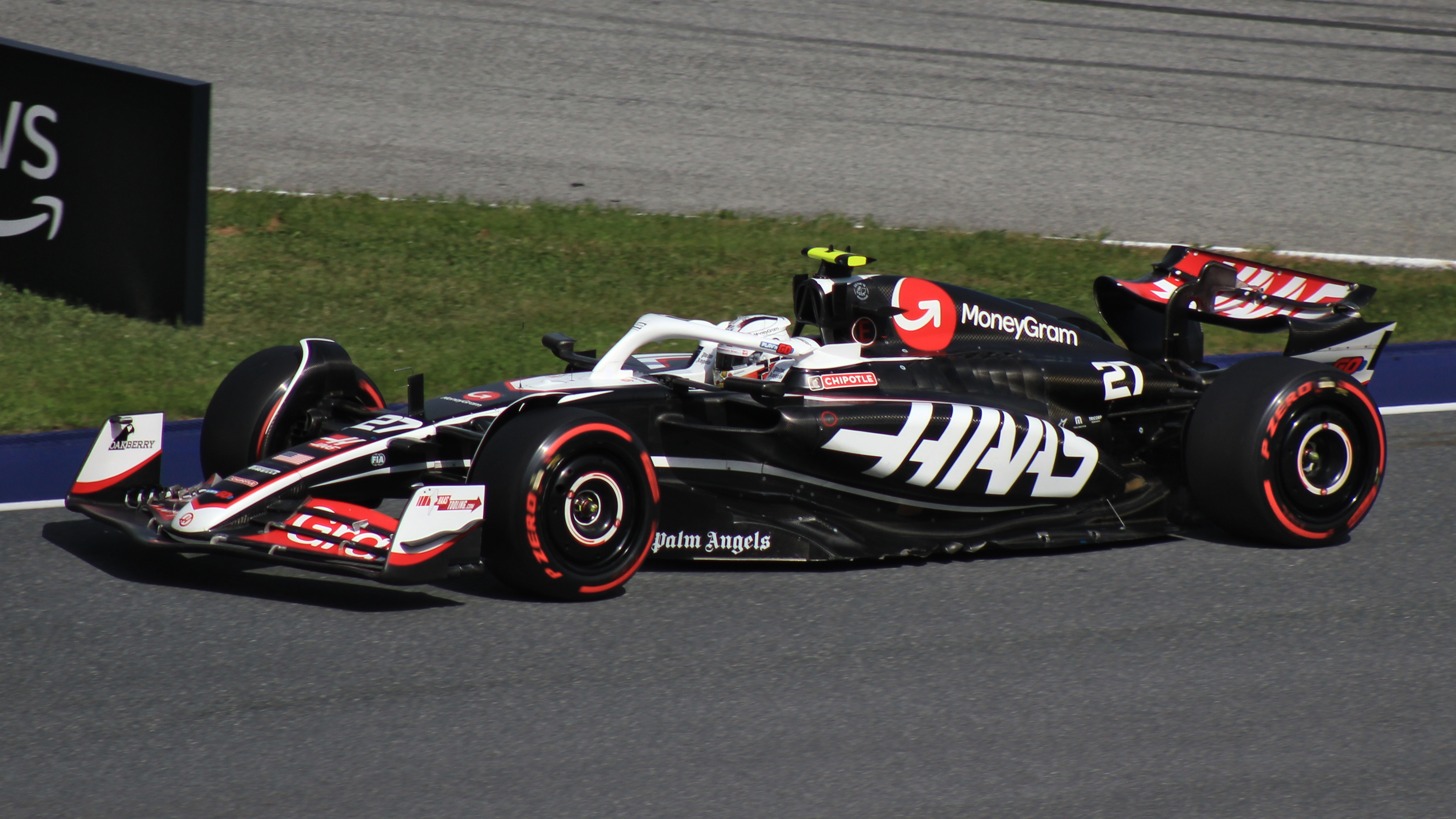
Nico Hülkenberg driving the Haas VF-24 at the 2024 Austrian Grand Prix

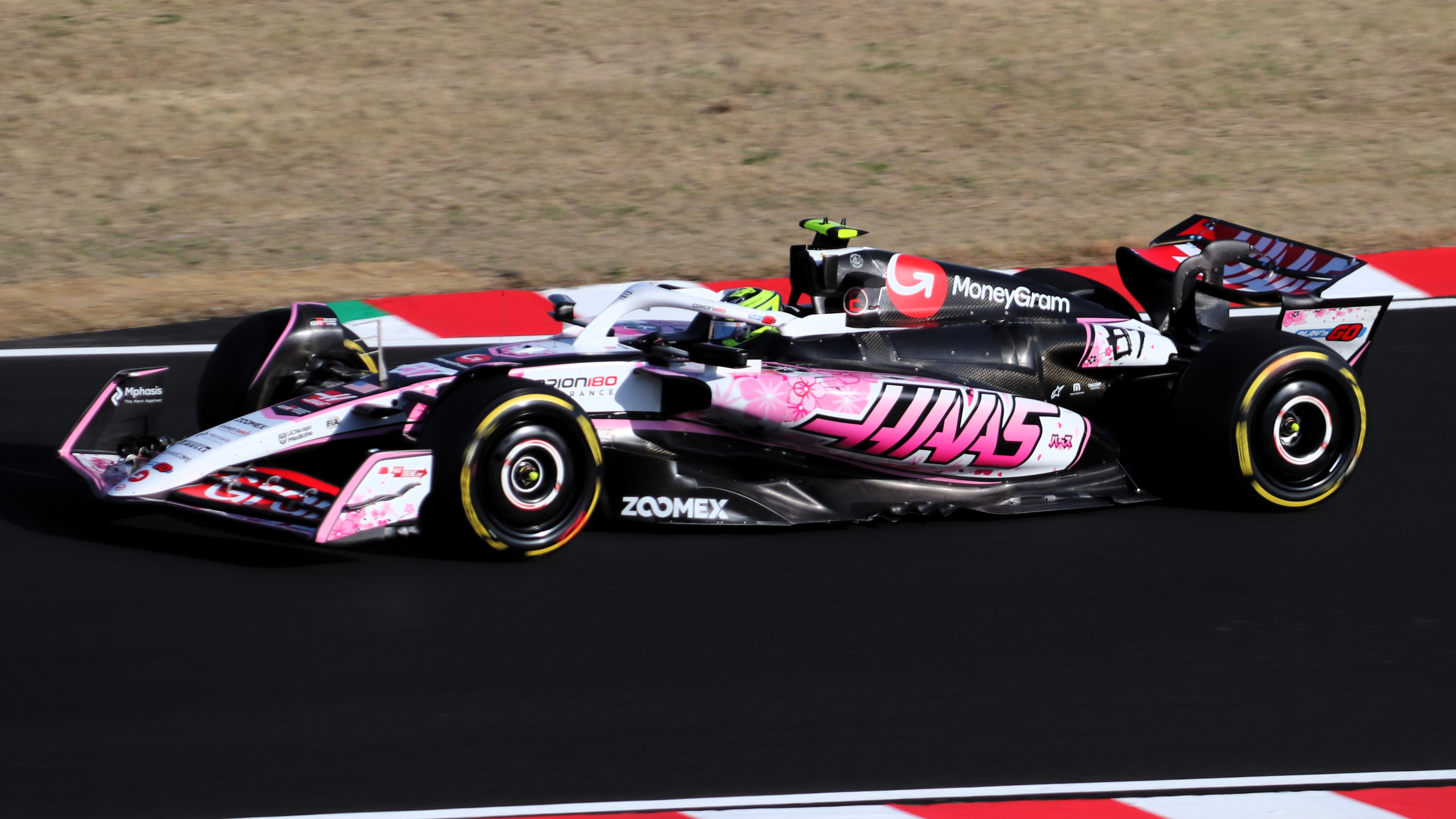
Oliver Bearman driving the 2025 Japanese Grand Prix special livery Haas VF-25

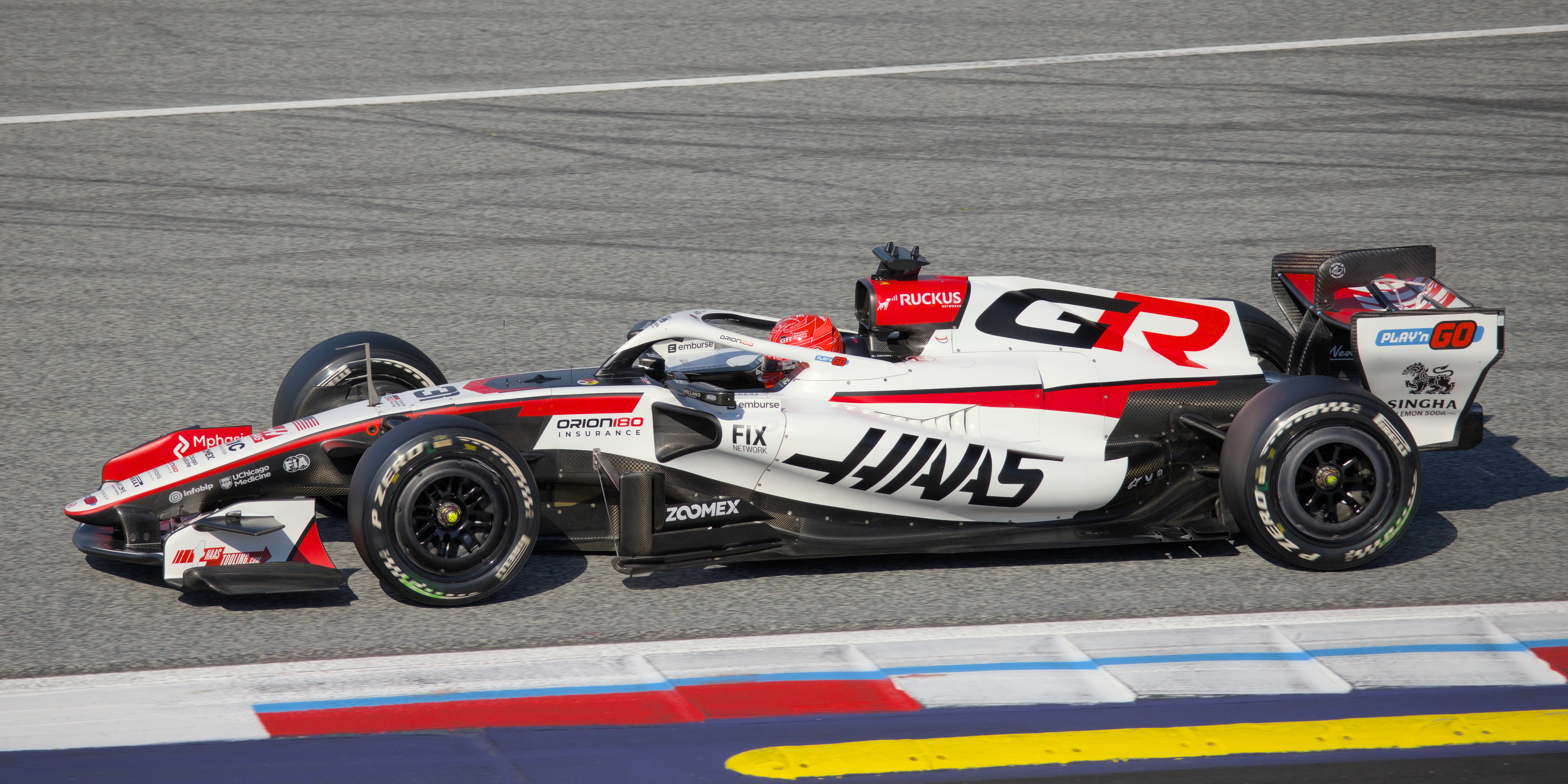
Esteban Ocon driving the Haas VF-26 at the 2026 Austrian Grand Prix

== Haas Lola ==
Year	Main colour(s)	Additional colour(s)	Livery sponsor(s)	Additional major sponsor(s)	Non-tobacco/alcohol livery changes
1985	Red	White, Blue	Beatrice	Shell, Goodyear, Champion, Avis, Samson, Callard & Bowser, Culligan	
1986	Red	White, Blue	Team Haas	Goodyear, Champion, Beatrice, BP, Ford, Koni	

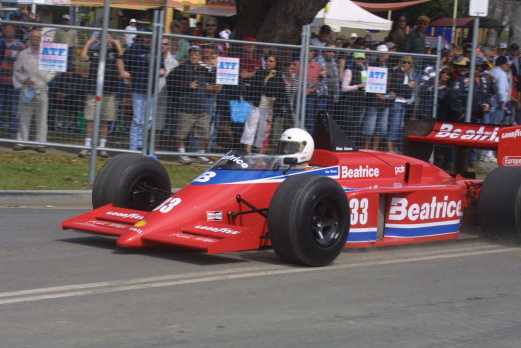
A Lola THL1 from 1985.

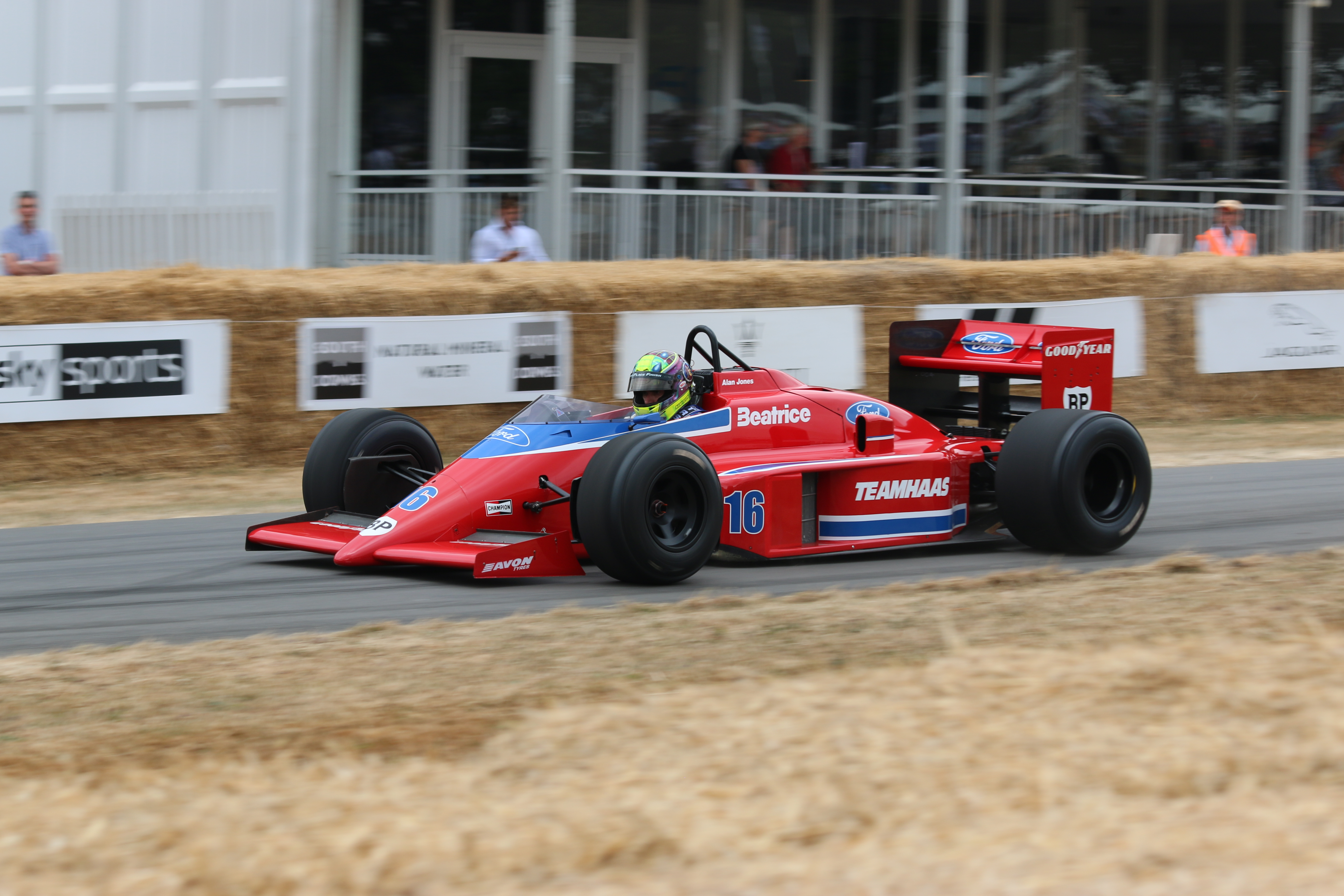
A Lola THL2, used in 1986, at the Goodwood Festival of Speed.

== Hesketh ==
Year	Driver(s)	Main colour(s)	Additional colour(s)	Livery sponsor(s)	Additional major sponsor(s)
1973	James Hunt	White	Blue and Red		Hesketh Finance
1974	James Hunt; Ian Scheckter	White	Blue and Red		Hesketh Finance
1975	James Hunt; Brett Lunger	White	Blue and Red		Hesketh Finance
1975	Torsten Palm	White		Polarvagnen	Anderstorps Werkstads AB, BilAtlas, Jula Boats Sweden, Mitsubishi, Rotel Tours
1975	Harald Ertl	Gold		Warsteiner	BBS Kraftfahrzeugtechnik, Creole, Gustav A. Moecker, Linea Sport, RTL, Sachs Sporting, Schmitthelm, Shell
1976	Harald Ertl	White	Blue and Red		ATS Leichtmetallräder, Ronal, Sachs Sporting, Shell, Valvoline
1976	Harald Ertl	White	Blue and Red	Heyco Werkzeuge (Austrian Grand Prix onwards)	ATS Leichtmetallräder, Ronal, Sachs Sporting, Shell, Valvoline
1976	Harald Ertl	Light Blue		Heyco Werkzeuge (Austrian Grand Prix onwards)	ATS Leichtmetallräder, Ronal, Sachs Sporting, Shell, Valvoline
1976	Guy Edwards	Blue	White (Image of a woman holding a box of Rizla+. cigarette papers)	Penthouse, Rizla+.	Armstrong, Cossack Mens Toiletries
1976	Rolf Stommelen	Blue	White (Image of a woman holding a box of Rizla+. cigarette papers)	Penthouse, Rizla+.	Warsteiner
1976	Alex Ribeiro	Blue	White (Image of a woman holding a box of Rizla+. cigarette papers)	Penthouse, Rizla+.	Valvoline
1977	Rupert Keegan	Blue	White and Yellow (Image of a woman holding a box of Rizla+. cigarette papers)	Penthouse, Rizla+.	British Air Ferries, Finanzplanung Schweimler, Shell
1977	Harald Ertl	White		Heyco Werkzeuge	Ford, Heuer, Ronal, Sachs Sporting, Shell
1977	Héctor Rebaque	White	Red	Marlboro	Sidral Mundet
1977	Ian Ashley	White	Blue and Black	Obex Oil	Godfrey Bilton
1978	Divina Galica; Eddie Cheever; Derek Daly	Blue	Yellow	Olympus Cameras	

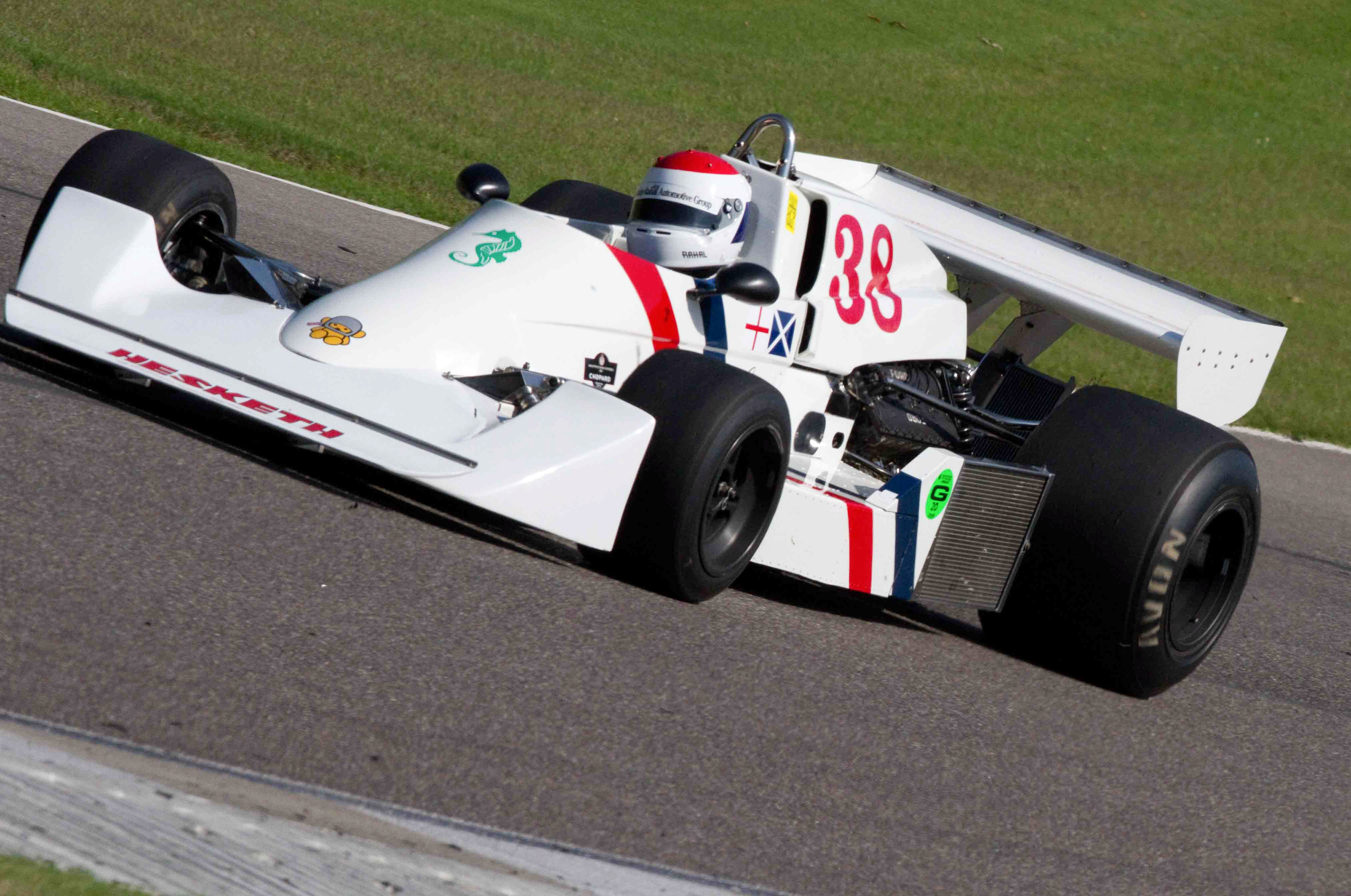
1975 Hesketh 308C driven at Barber Motorsports Park. The car lacked any sponsorship and featured the flags of England and Scotland

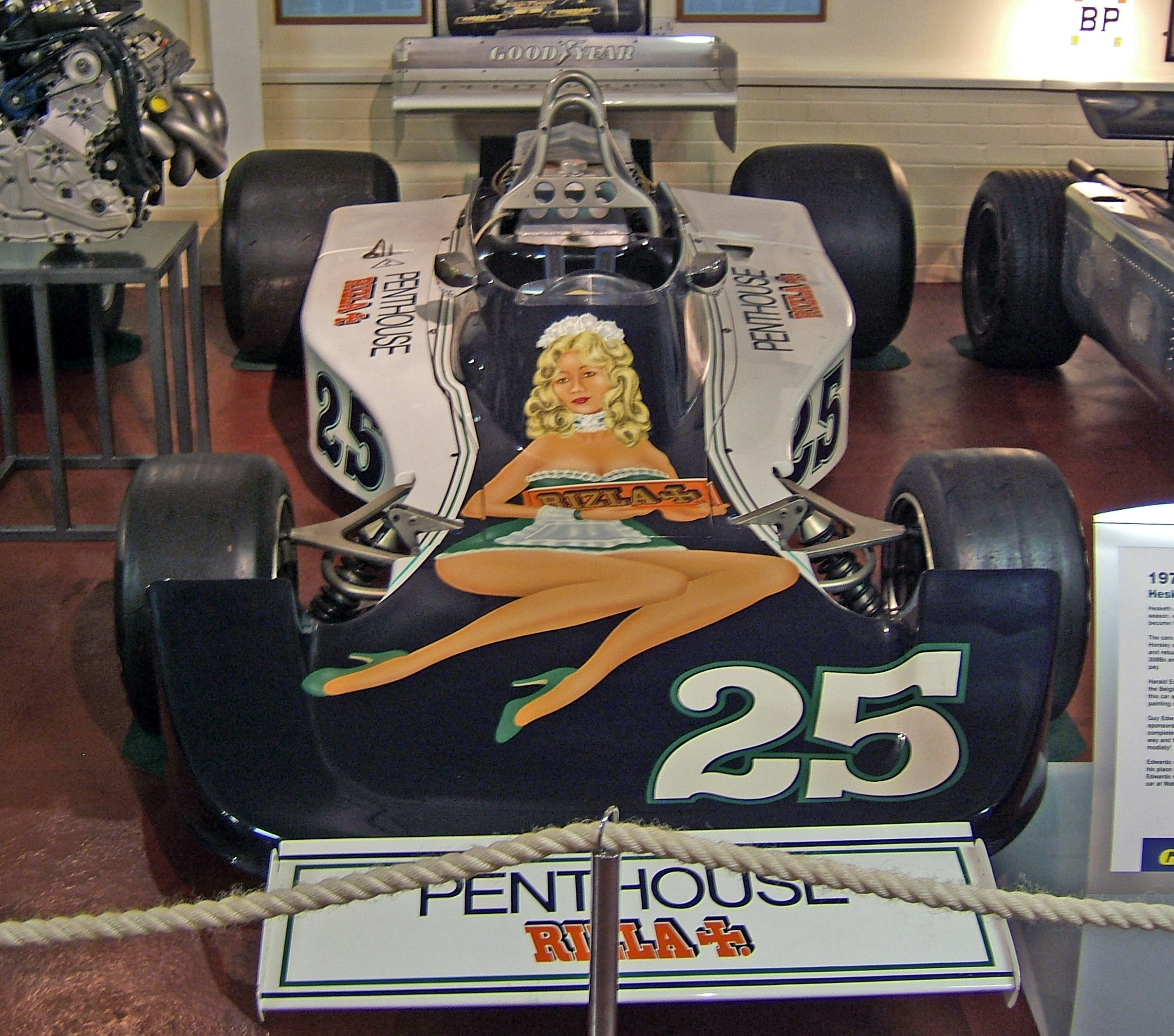
1976 Hesketh 308D. Image shows well the large painted Penthouse Pet, apparently initially painted topless, but the Rizla packet was added for decency.

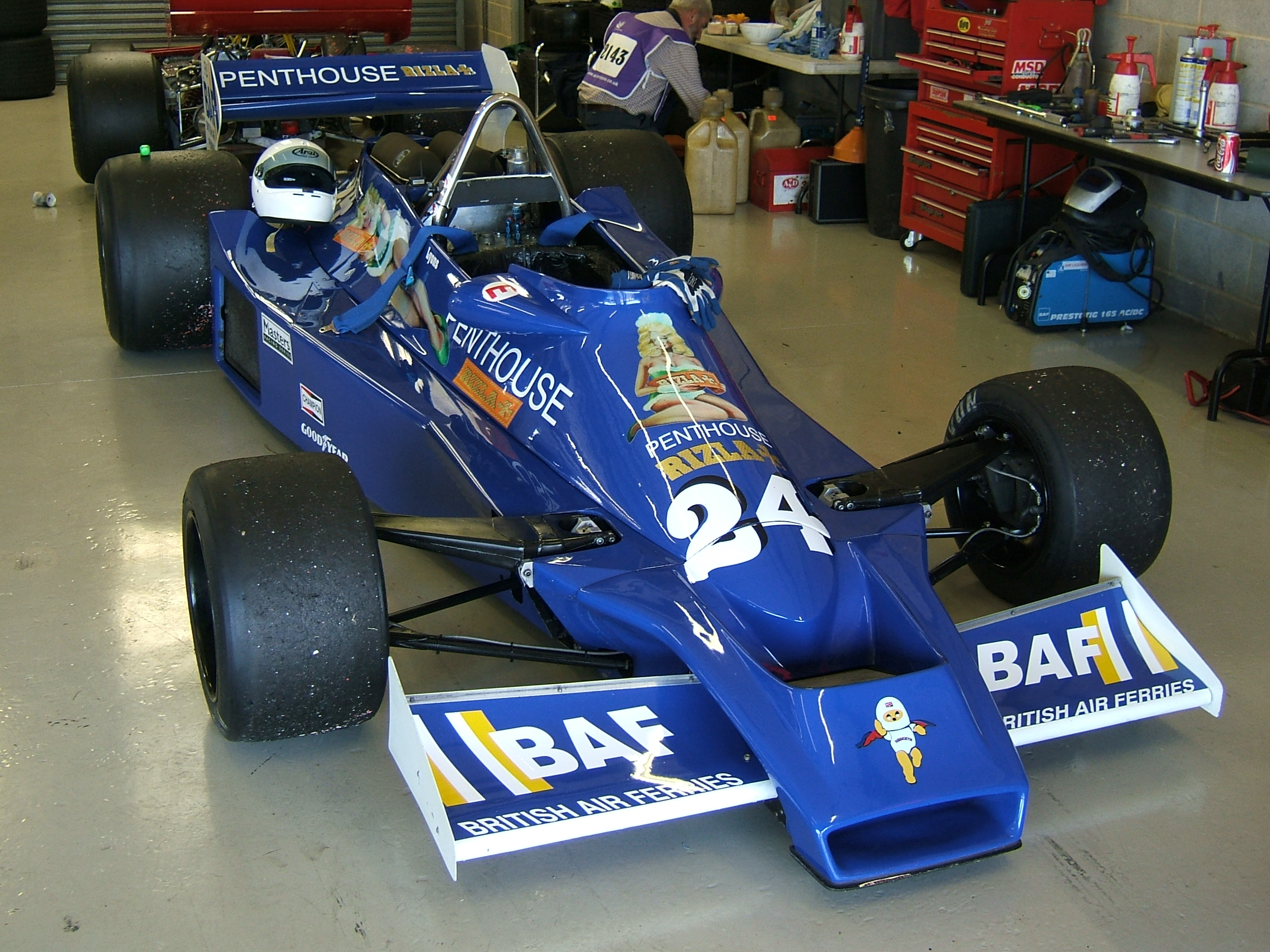
1977 Penthouse Rizla Racing Hesketh 308E-Cosworth waiting in the pit garages during the Silverstone Classic race meeting

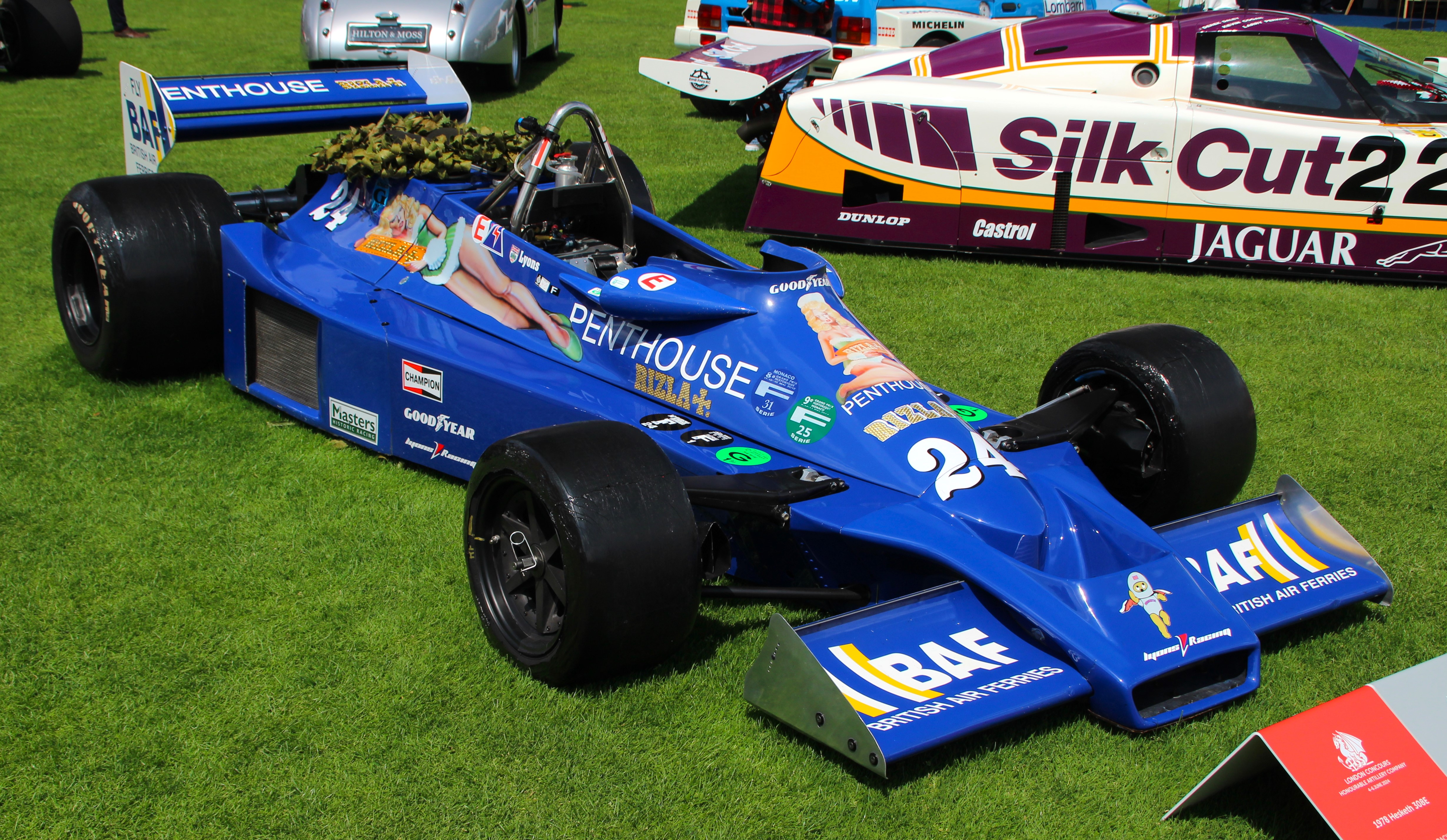
1978 livery on the Hesketh 308E at the London Concours

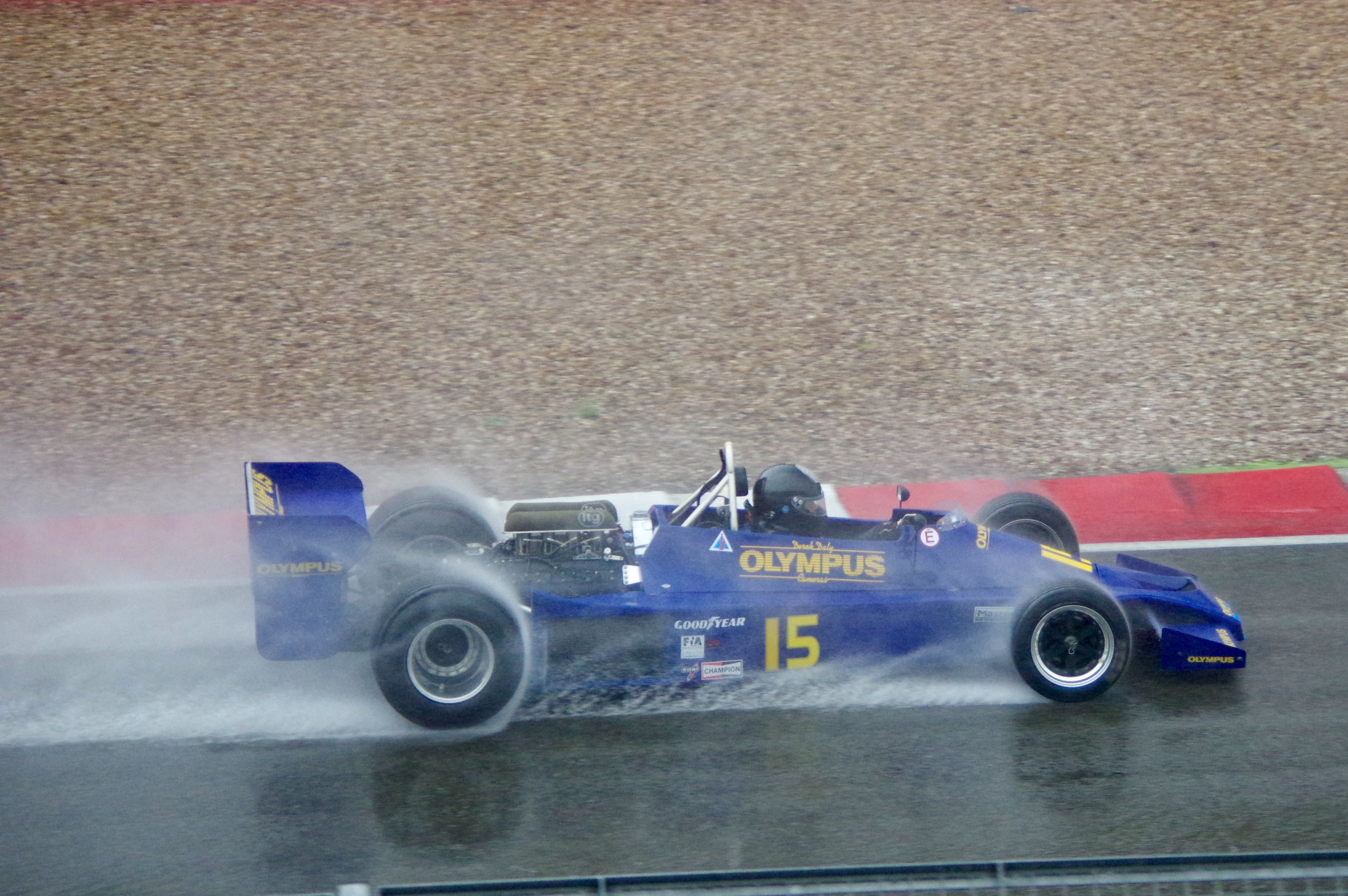
1978 Hesketh 308E being driven at the Silverstone Classic in 2015

== Hill ==
The Embassy Hill, founded by two-time World Champion Graham Hill, raced during the 1975 season with Imperial Tobacco's Embassy brand as title sponsor. The cars were predominantly white, with a red vertical stripe behind the cockpit. The team folded following the aircraft accident in which Hill, driver Tony Brise and four other team members were killed in November 1975.

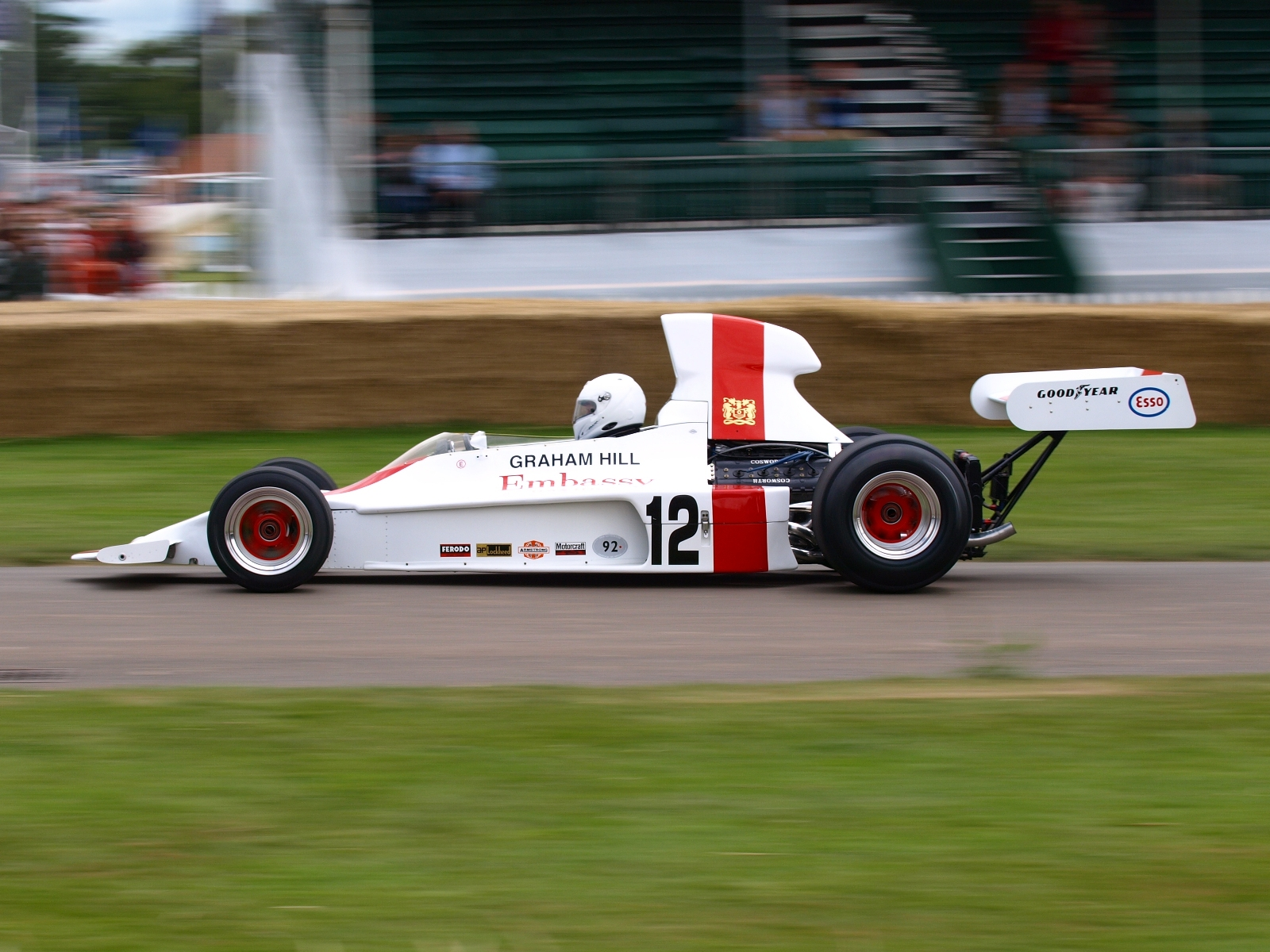
The 1973 Shadow DN1 being demonstrated at the Goodwood Festival of Speed.

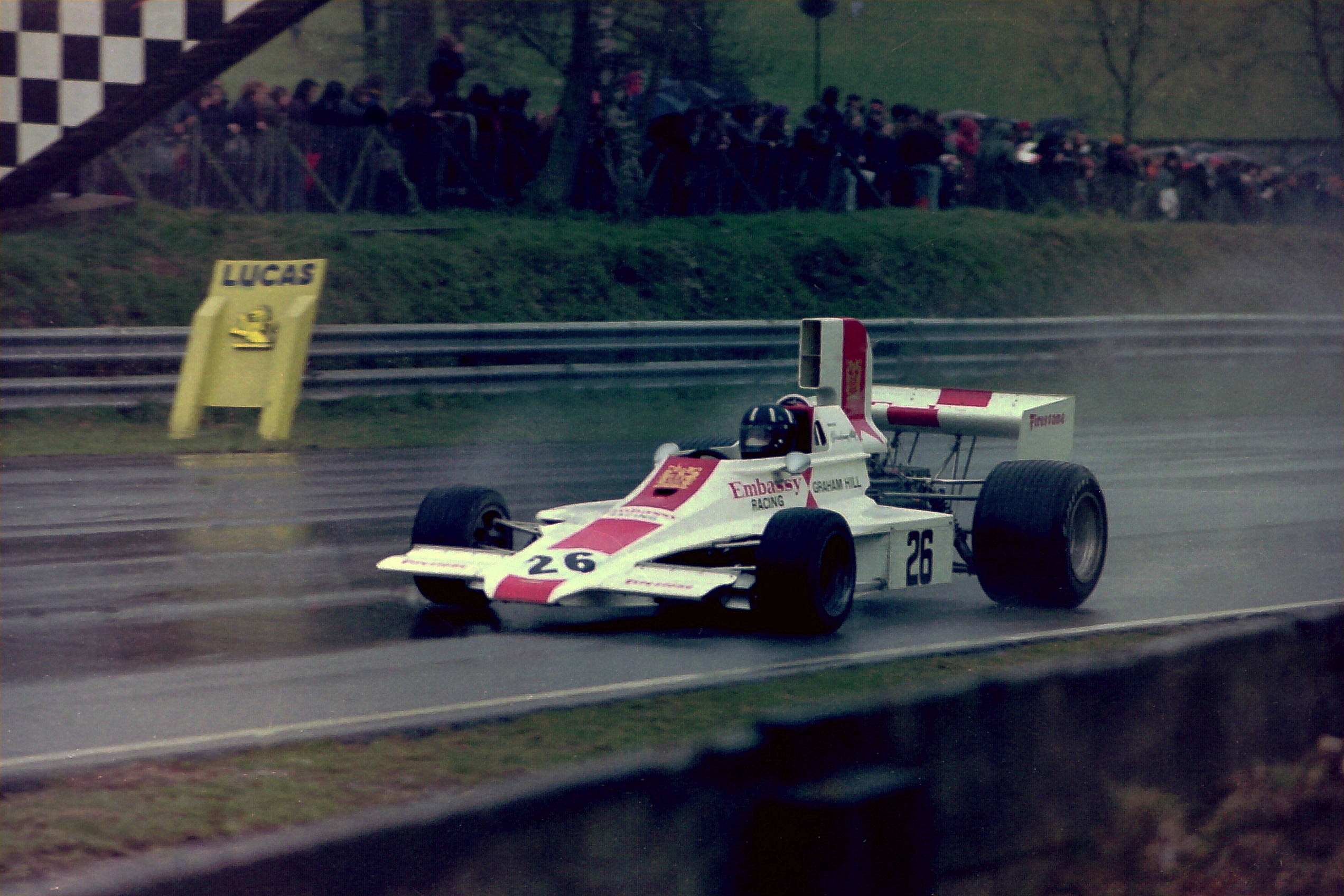
Team Founder Graham Hill driving the 1974 Lola T370 at the 1974 Race of Champions.

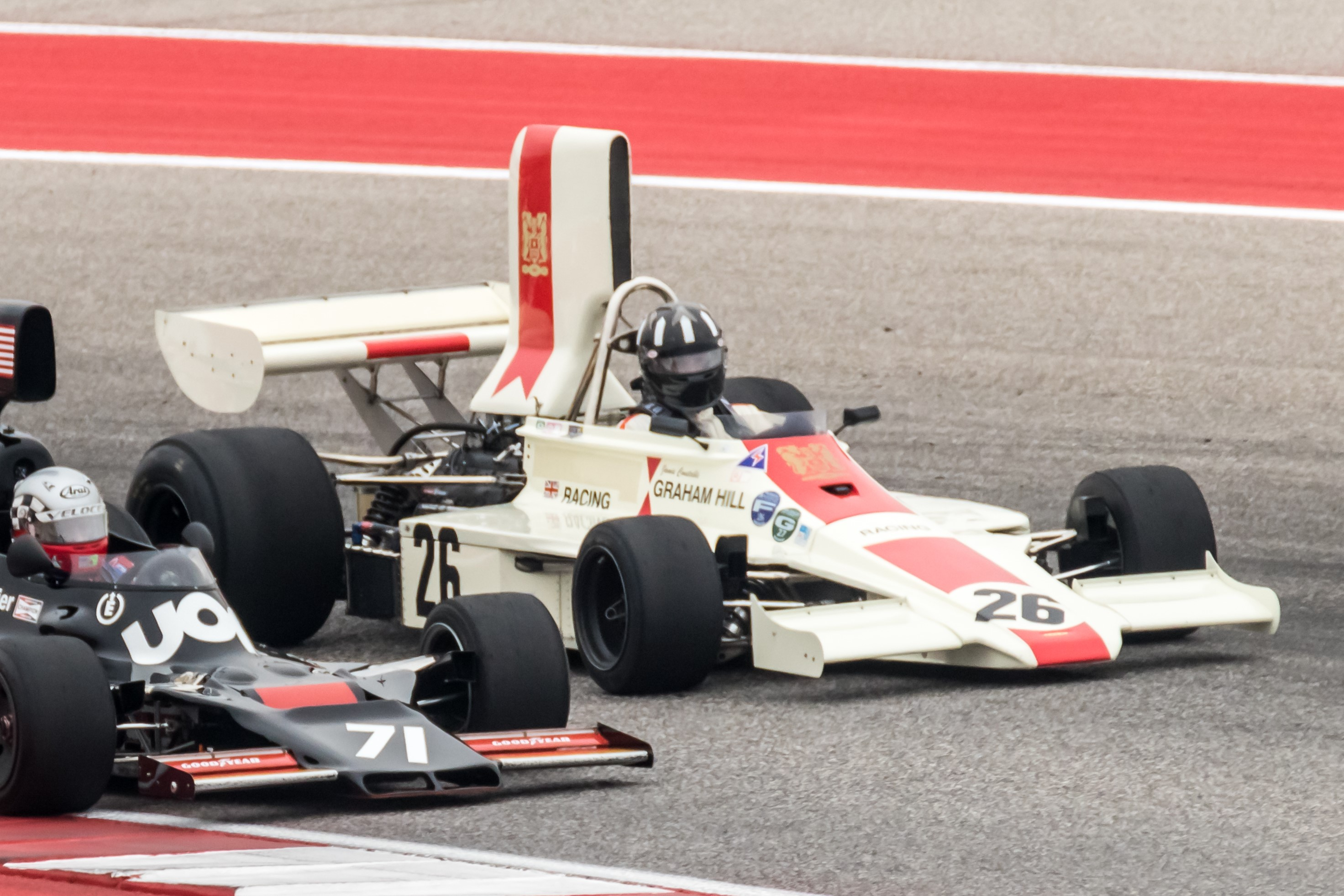
The Hill GH1, a car used in the 1975 Formula One season.

== Honda ==
Honda first raced in Formula One from 1964 to 1968. The cars were entered in an all-white livery with a red circle (duplicating the Japanese flag), the national racing colour of Japan. The company won two races but left F1 at the end of the 1968 season, before returning as an engine supplier in the 1980s. Honda in the 1990s never raced, but created prototypes like the RC100 and the RA099 tested at Suzuka Circuit. After a decade away from the sport, Honda returned again as an engine supplier in 2001, before buying the British American Racing team and entering F1 as a constructor in 2006. For the 2006 season, Honda continued with the BAT sponsorship with the Lucky Strike logo, but BAT pulled out for 2007. From 2007, the only logos on the car are the Honda badge, the Bridgestone logo, and the logo of Honda's environmental awareness program, Earth Dreams. For 2007, the livery itself was a picture of the Earth on a black background. For 2008, however, there are only pieces of the image of Earth on a mainly white background, as opposed to the whole of the Earth being on Honda's car.

Year	Main colour(s)	Additional colour(s)	Livery sponsor(s)	Additional major sponsor(s)	Non-tobacco/alcohol livery changes
1964–1965	White	Red sun disc			
1966–1968	White	Red, Black		Firestone, Ferodo, Shell, Champion	
1991–1996 (RC100, never raced)	Black	None	Honda		
1999 (RA099, never raced)	White	Black	Honda		
2006	White	Red, Gold, Black	Lucky Strike (British American Tobacco), 555 (in China)	Intercond, Celerant, ENEOS, NGK, 555, Ray-Ban, NTN, Alpinestars, Showa	Lucky Strike logo changed to "Racing Revolution", "Look Left", "Look Right" and during the 2006 Brazilian Grand Prix "Last Blast" was on the rear wing and Lucky Strike logo was replaced with a Heart with a security pin and a paper written "Racing Forever".
2007	Earth (picture)	Black	myearthdream.com (Honda)	None	None
2008	White, Red	Earth	Earth Dreams (Honda)	None	None

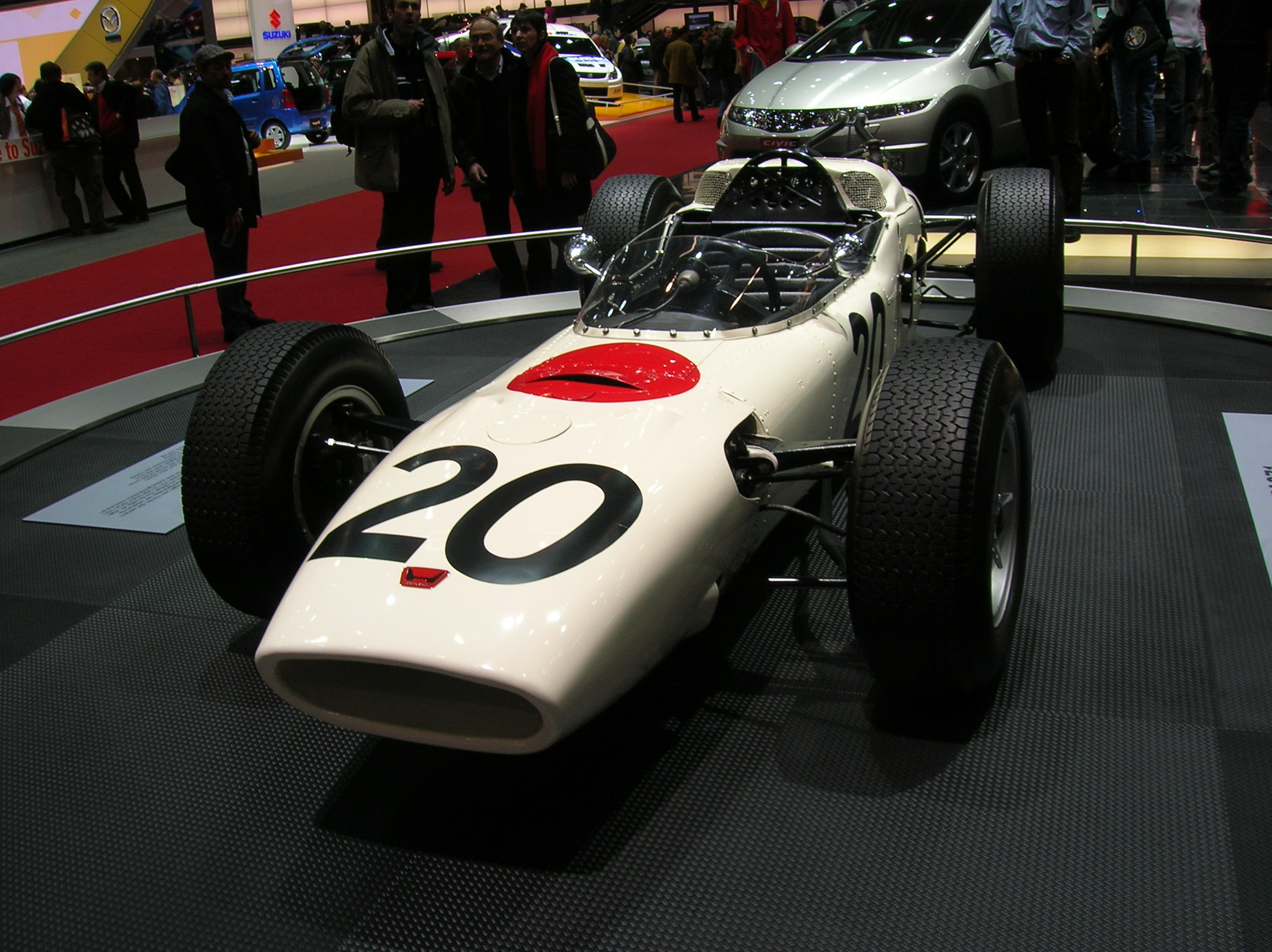
Honda's first F1 car, the 1964 Honda RA271, on display.

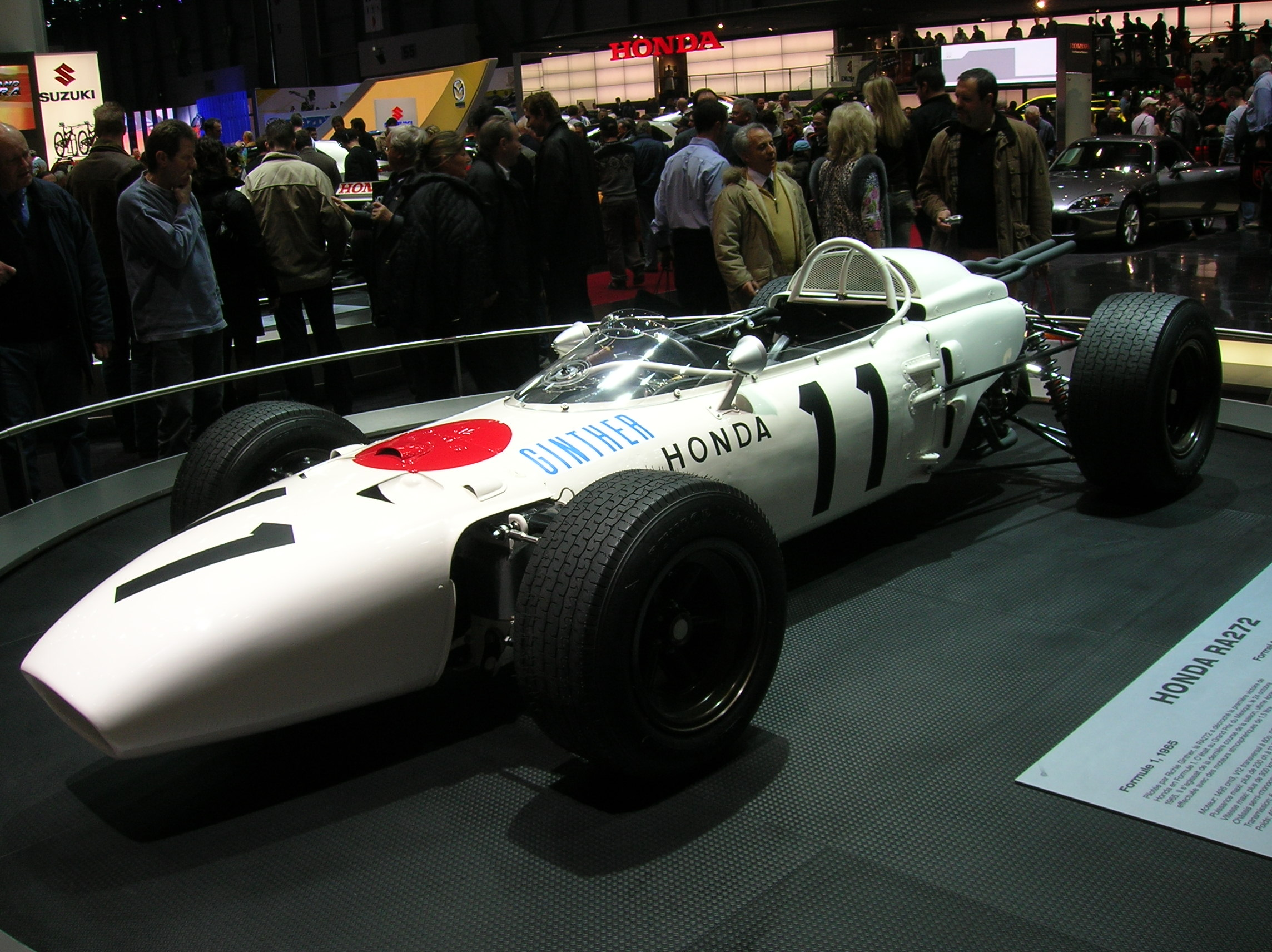
A 1965 Honda RA272 in the racing colors of Japan.

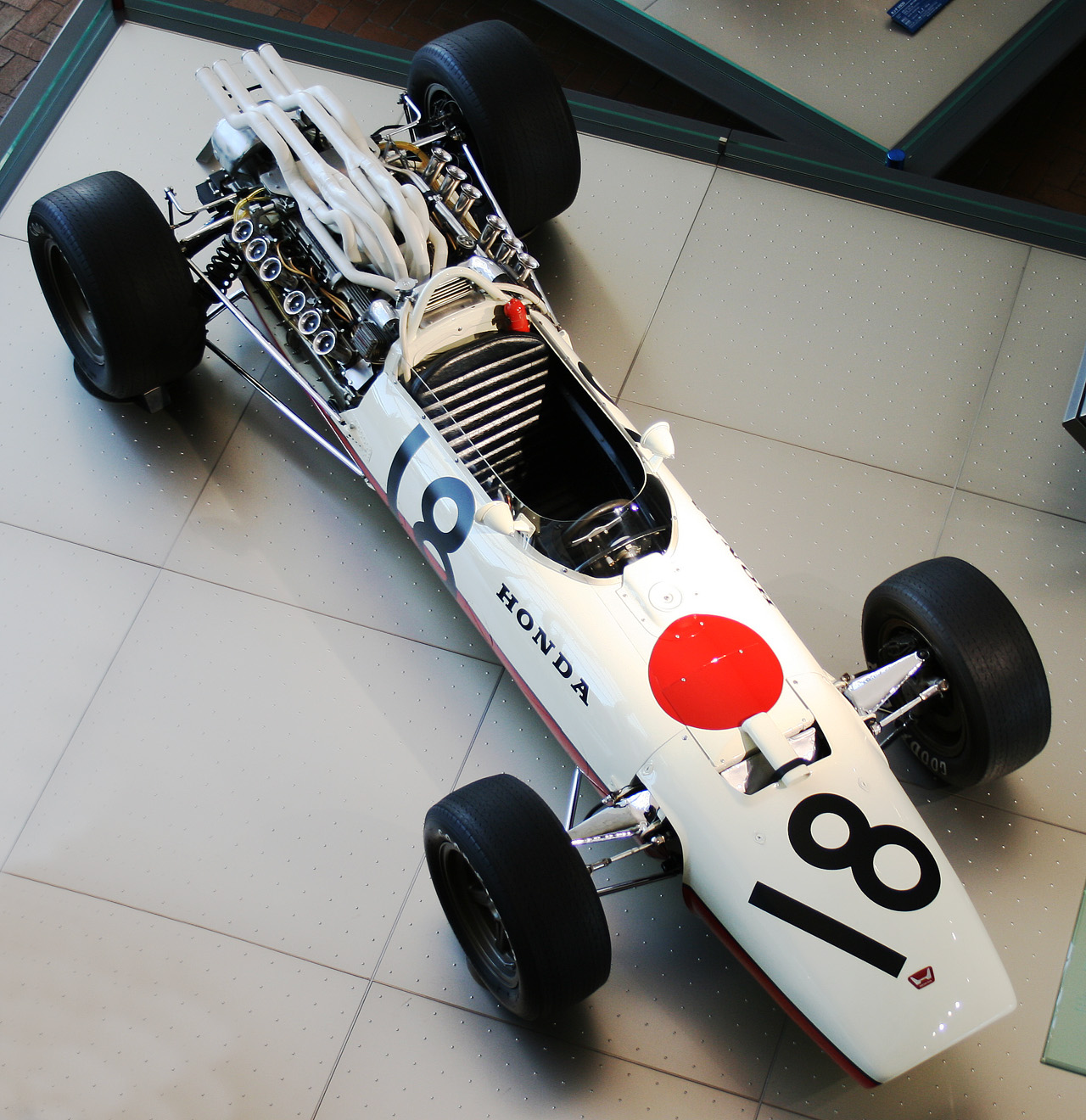
Richie Ginther's Honda RA273 from 1966.

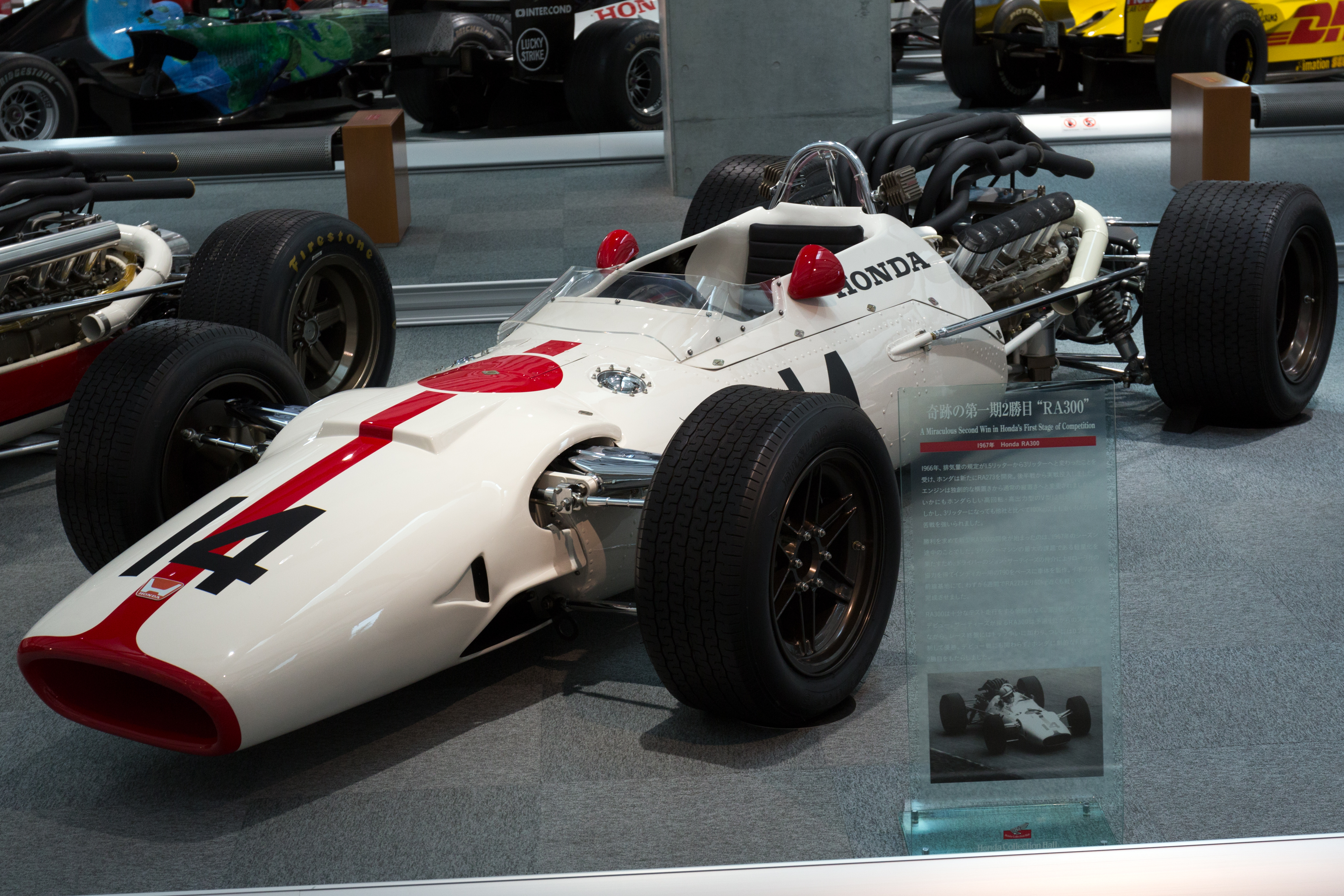
John Surtees' Honda RA300 from 1967.

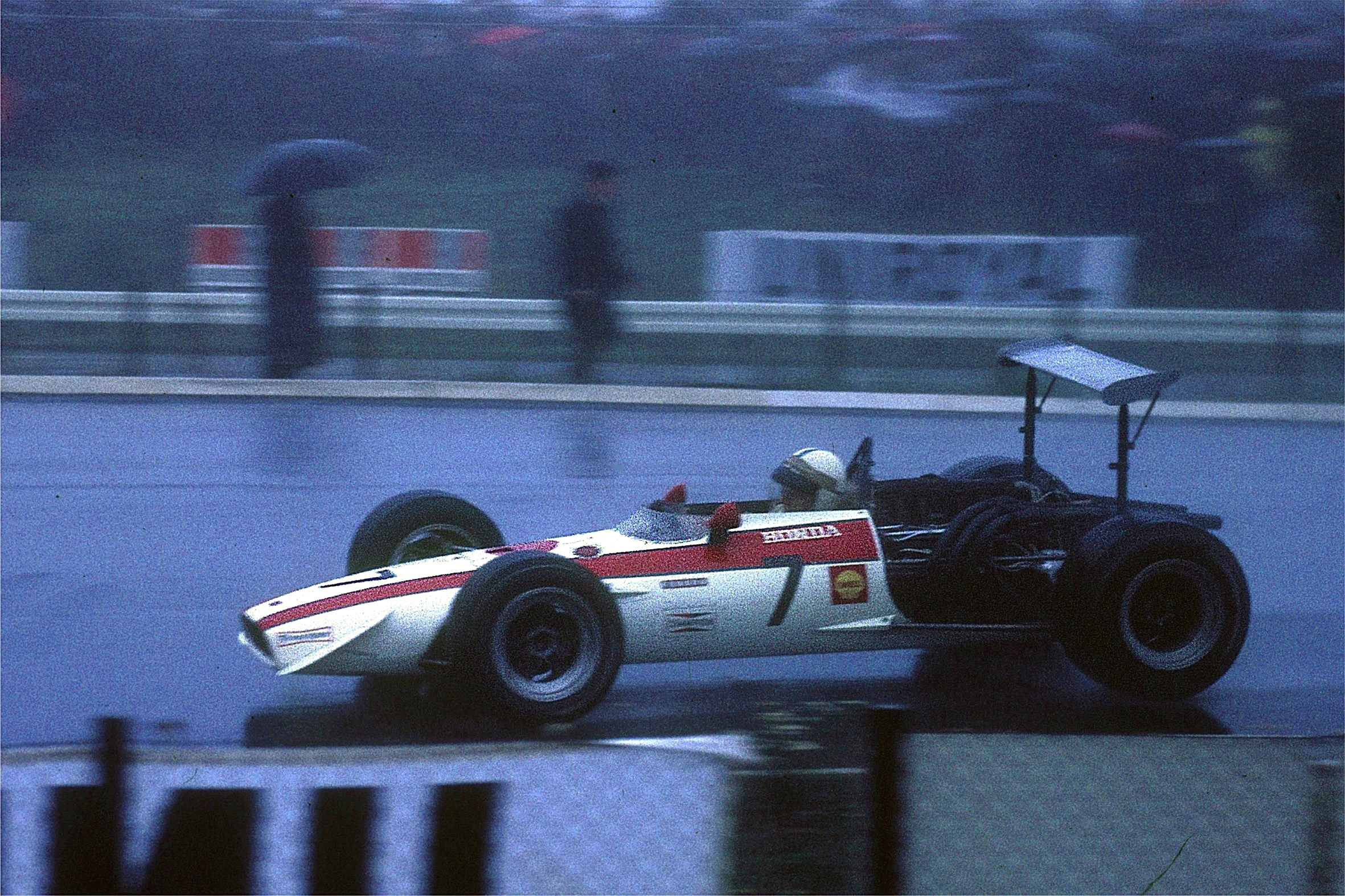
John Surtees driving the Honda RA301 at the 1968 German Grand Prix.

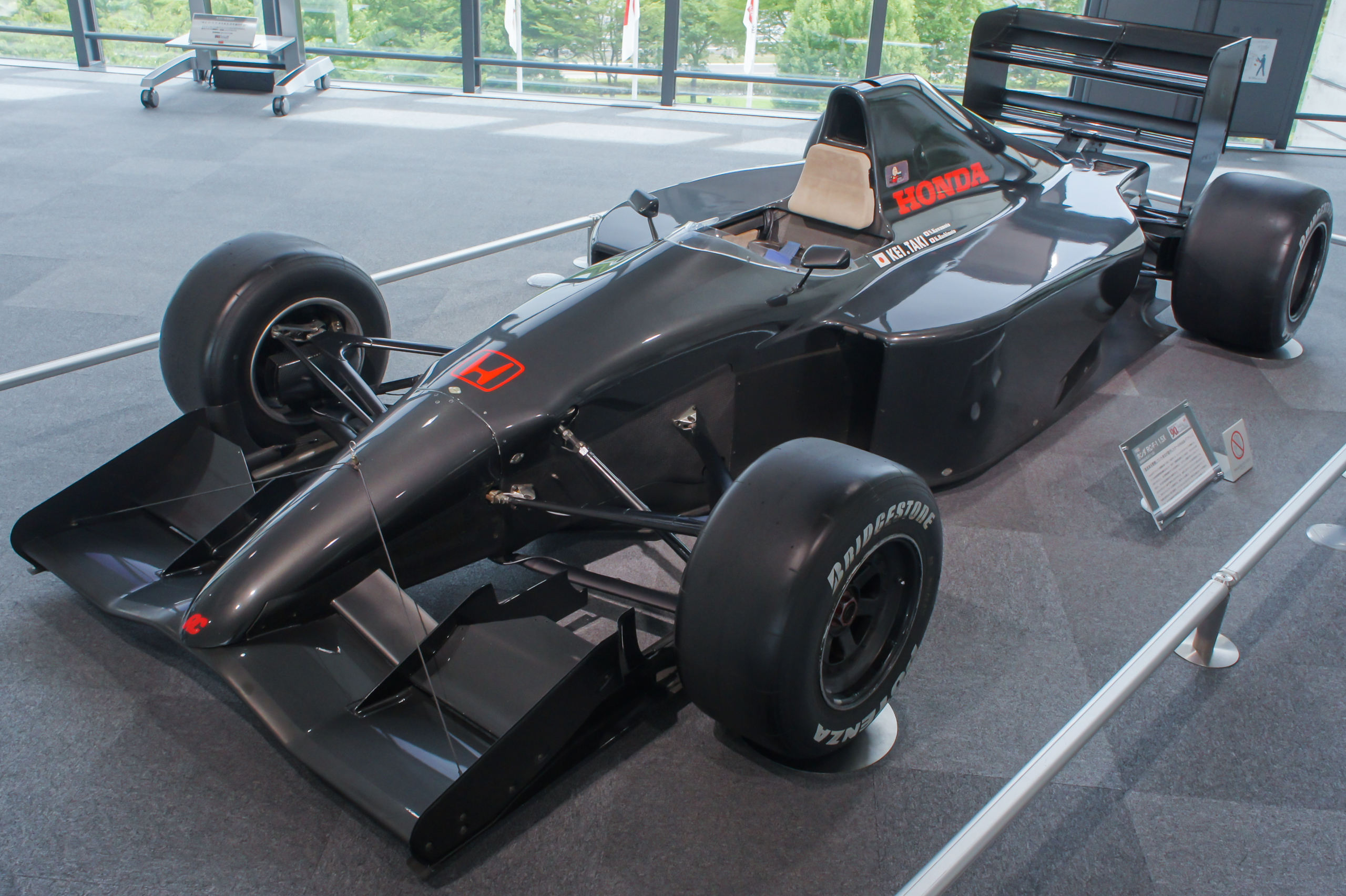
The Honda RC100 prototype which was completed in 1993 and was only tested.

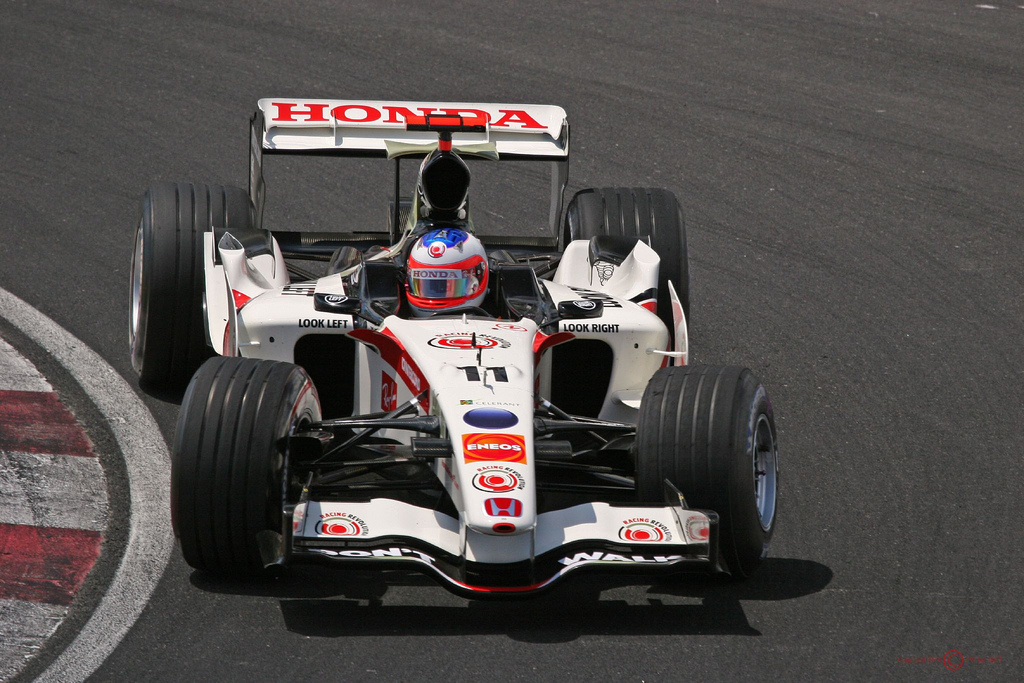
Upon its return to F1 in 2006, Honda continued with virtually the same livery as had been used by the British American Racing team in preceding years. This is Rubens Barrichello driving the Honda RA106 at the 2006 Canadian Grand Prix.

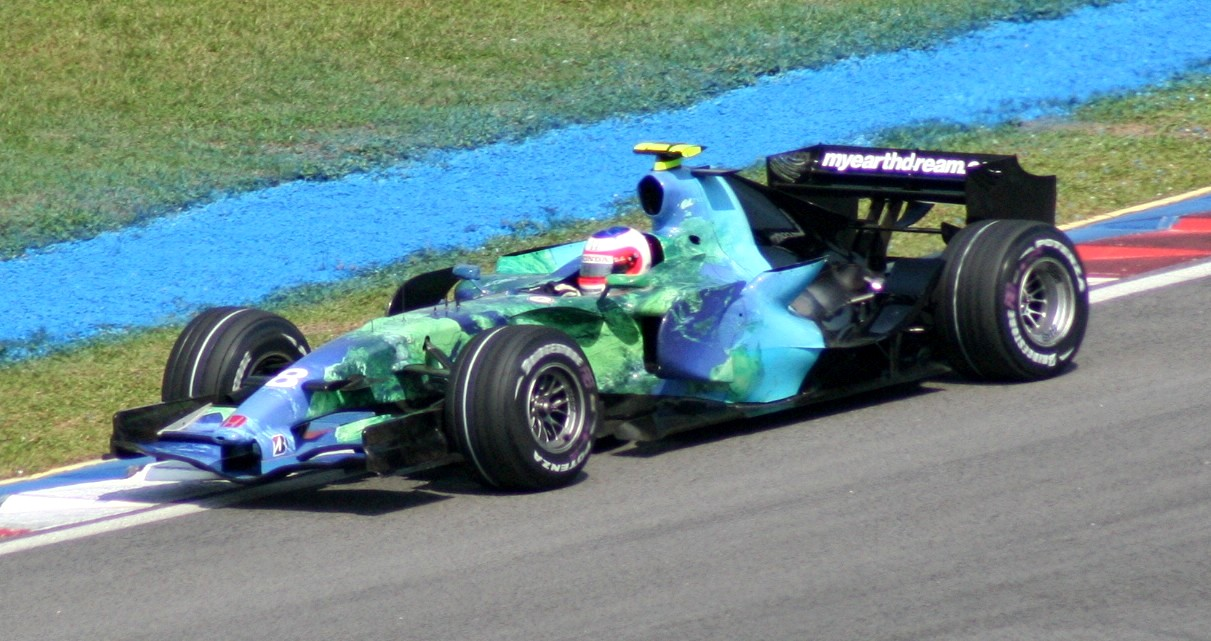
The 2007 Honda RA107 in its distinctive Earth livery, being driven by Rubens Barrichello at Malaysia in 2007.

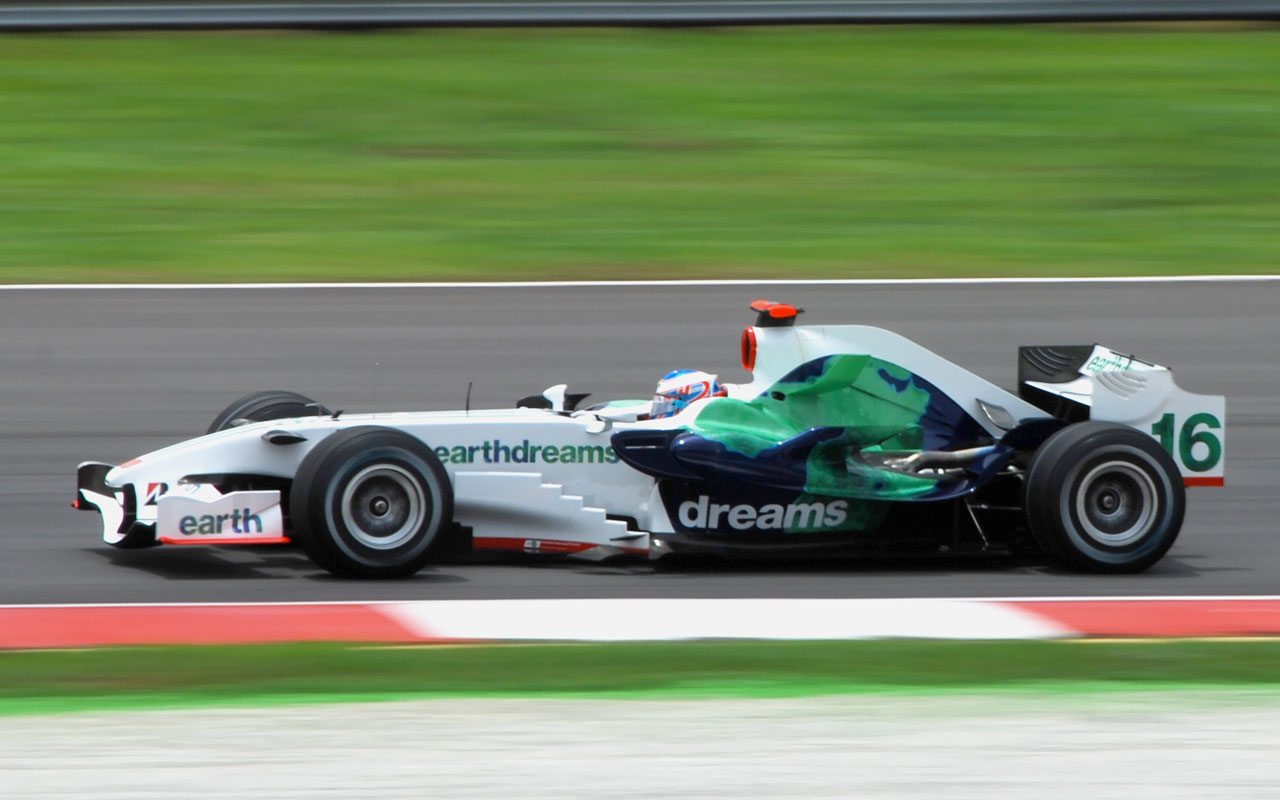
The earth-themed livery was revised for 2008, as shown by Jenson Button at the 2008 Malaysian Grand Prix.

== HRT ==
The HRT Formula 1 Team competed for just three seasons, between 2010 and 2012. In that time, the team competed with three different liveries, this was due to a lack of sponsor continuity.

Year	Main colour(s)	Additional colour(s)	Livery sponsor(s)	Additional major sponsor(s)	Other information
2010	Dark Grey	Red, White, Orange	Hispania	Bridgestone, Embratel, Cosworth, Banco Cruzeiro do Sul, Upsynth, Jaypee Group, Panda Security	As HRT did not have a title sponsor for 2010, the driver's first name would be placed on the car's side pods each race.
2011	White	Red, Grey	TATA	Pirelli, Cosworth	Due to a lack of sponsorship, the team wrote various messages on the car, such as "This could be you", "This is a cool spot" and "Your logo here". After being purchased by Thesan Capital halfway through 2011, the messages were replaced by a silver HRT logo.
2012	White	Red, Gold	TATA	Pirelli, Cosworth, KH-7	Tata Tea sponsored HRT at the Indian Grand Prix only as well as Tetley at the Korean.

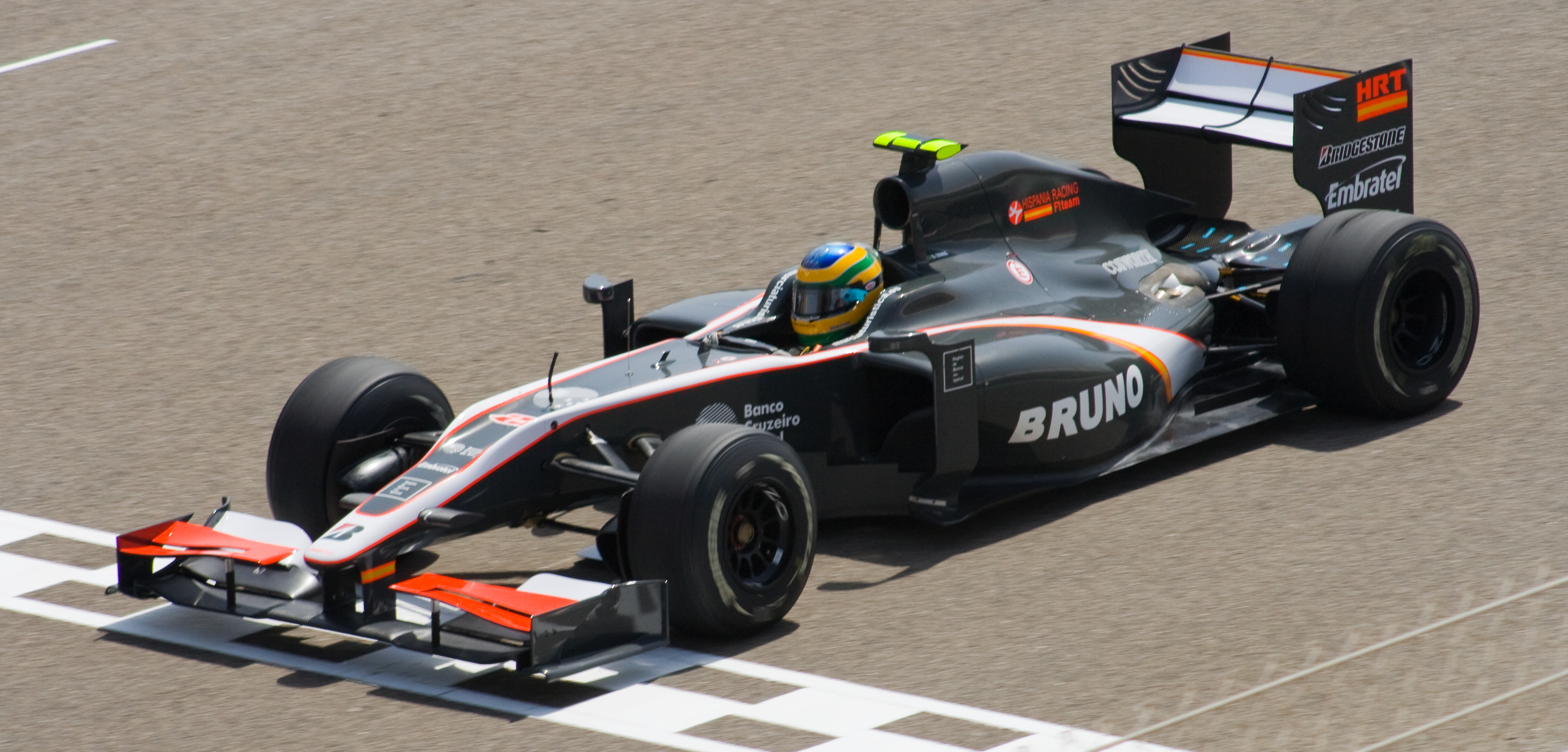
Bruno Senna driving for HRT at the 2010 Bahrain Grand Prix.

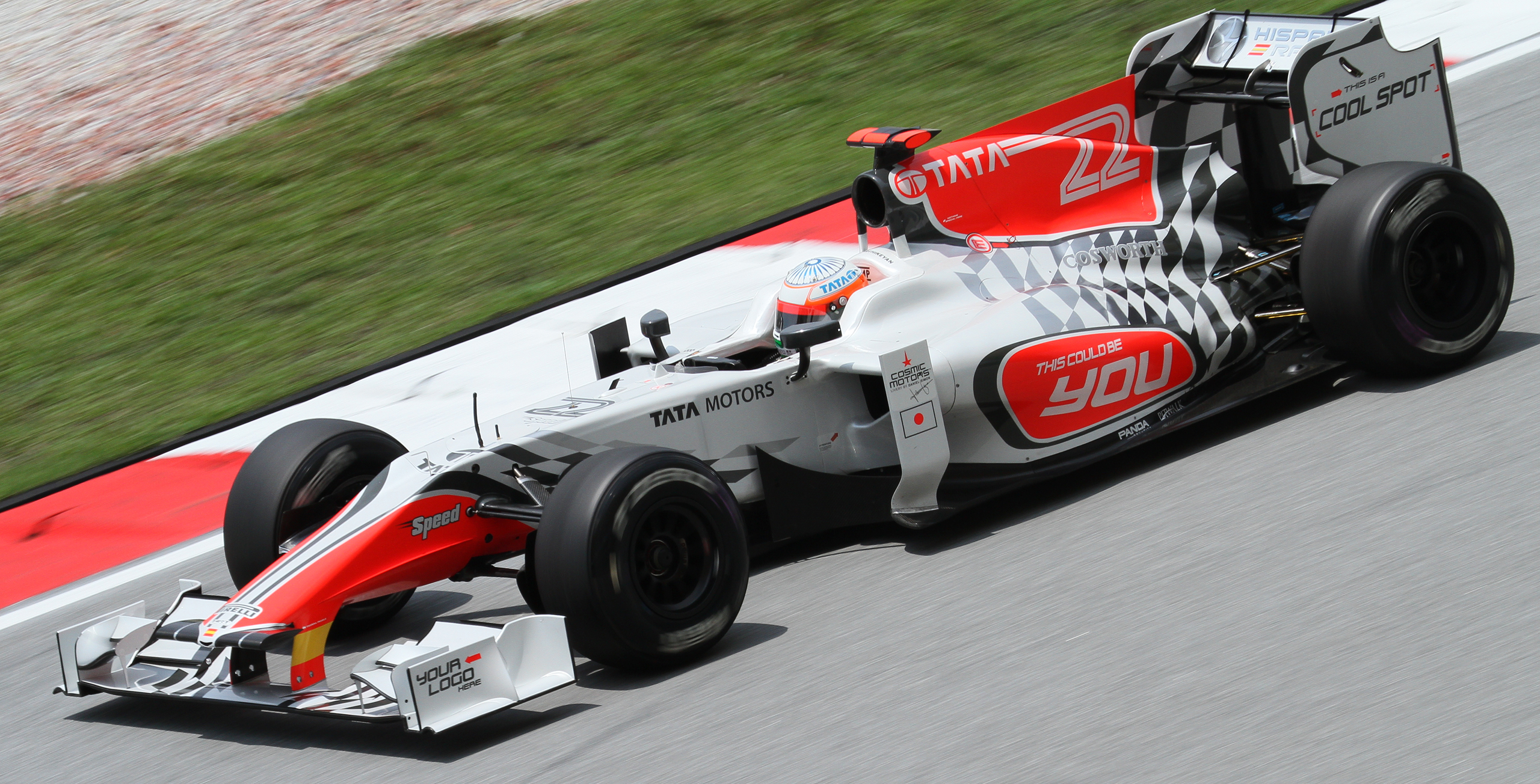
Narain Karthikeyan driving for HRT at the 2011 Malaysian Grand Prix.

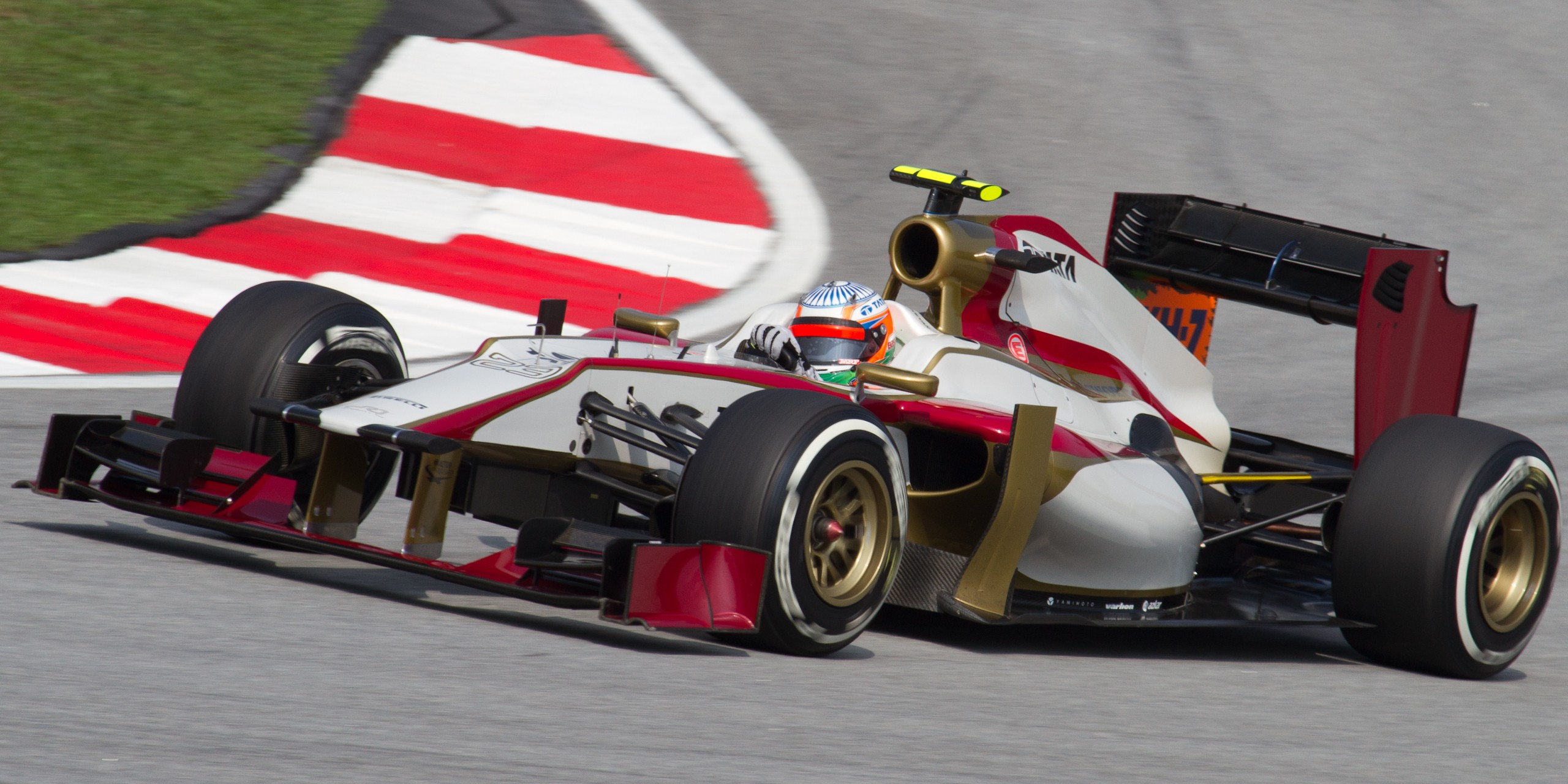
Narain Karthikeyan driving for HRT at the 2012 Malaysian Grand Prix.

== Jaguar ==
Jaguar used green to reflect its British nationality, just like British teams in the first decades of Formula One all used British racing green.

Year	Main colour(s)	Additional colour(s)	Main sponsor(s)	Additional major sponsor(s)	Non-tobacco/alcohol livery changes
2000–2004	Green	White	Jaguar, HSBC	Beck's, AT&T, HP, Du Pont, Visteon (2000), s.Oliver (2000), DHL (2000), MCI Worldcom (2000), Red Bull (2004), Texaco (2000–2001), Lear (2000–2001), Castrol (2002–2004), Hangar-7 (2004), Pioneer (2004)	Beck's was replaced by "BEST'S". The team used special livery with black engine covers for 2001 Italian Grand Prix in remembrance of the 11 September 2001 attacks in the United States. The team supported movies Terminator 3: Rise of the Machines at the 2003 British Grand Prix respectively. During the 2004 Monaco Grand Prix, the team promoted the movie Ocean's Twelve with a livery and a diamond worth $300,000 installed on the car's nose. Both cars ultimately retired; Webber's diamond was intact, though Klien's was not. During the 2004 Chinese Grand Prix, the HSBC lettering was change to its Chinese acronym, 汇丰 (huìfēng).

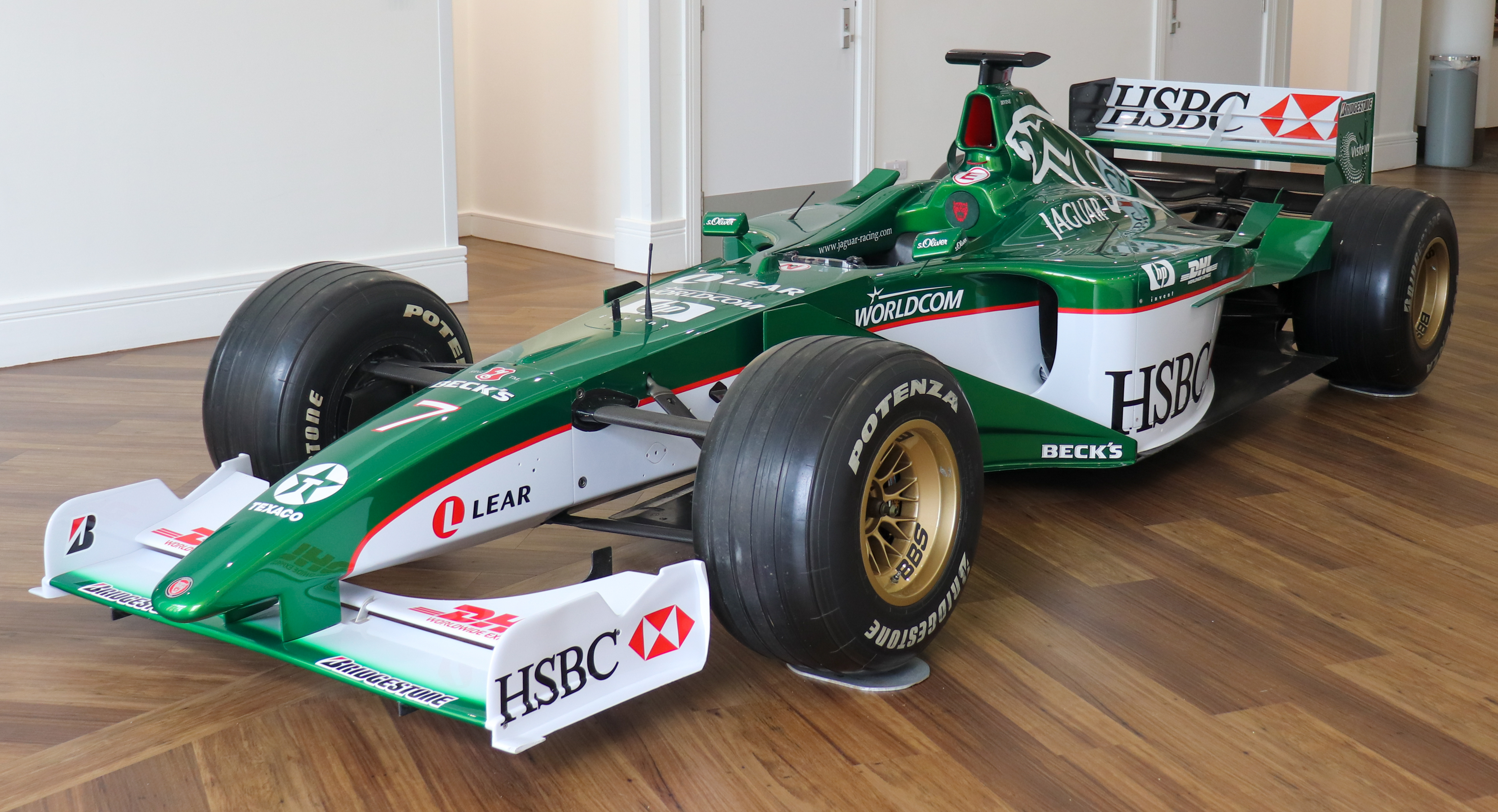
Jaguar's first Formula One car, the Jaguar R1

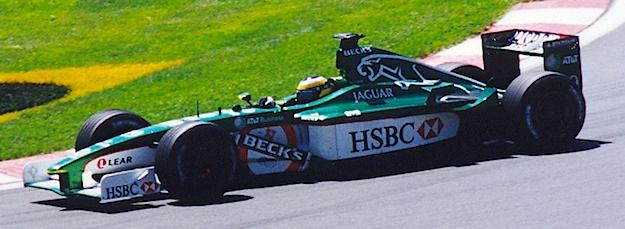
Pedro de la Rosa driving the Jaguar R2 at the 2001 Canadian Grand Prix.

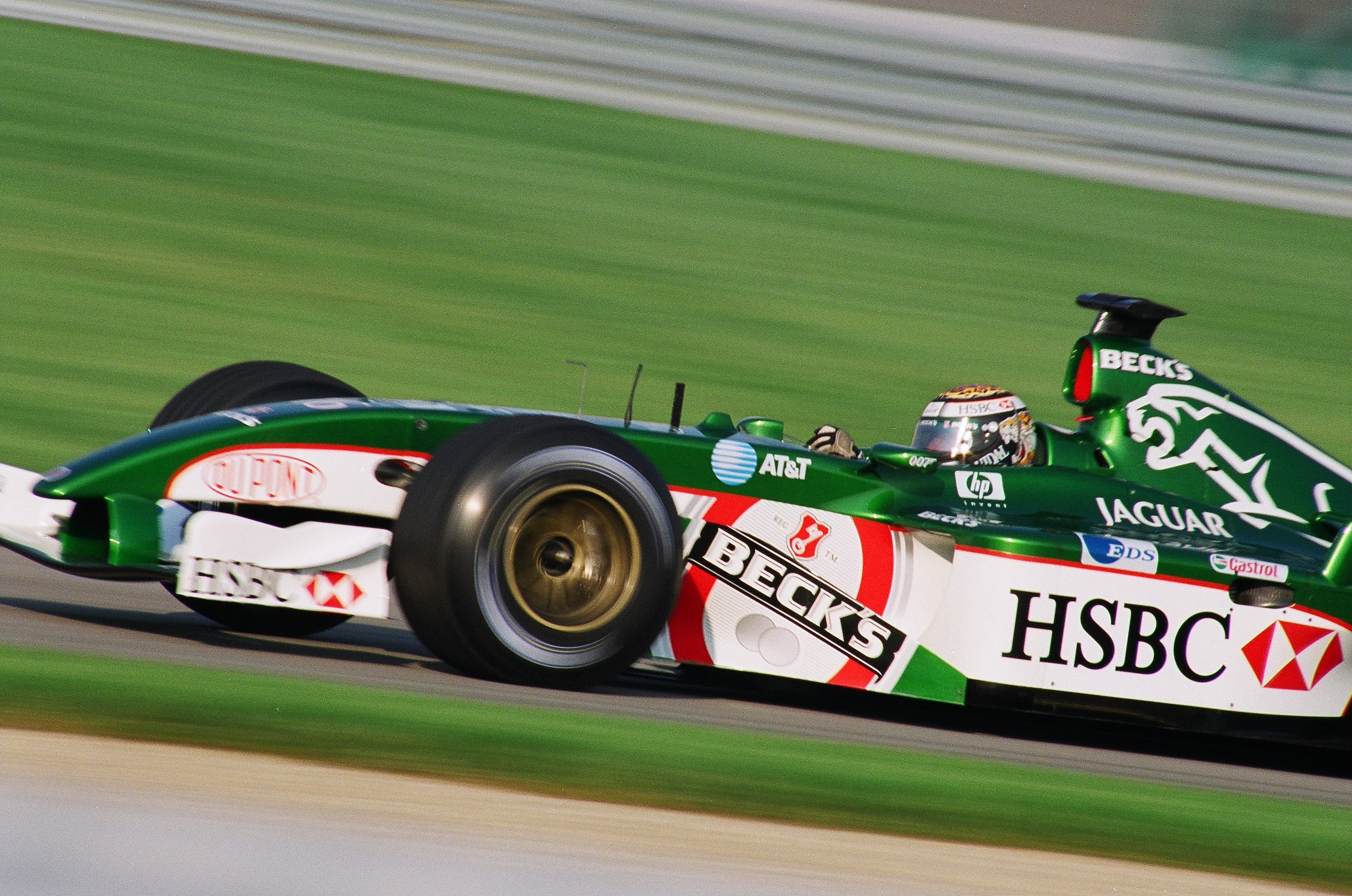
Eddie Irvine driving the Jaguar R3 at the 2002 United States Grand Prix.

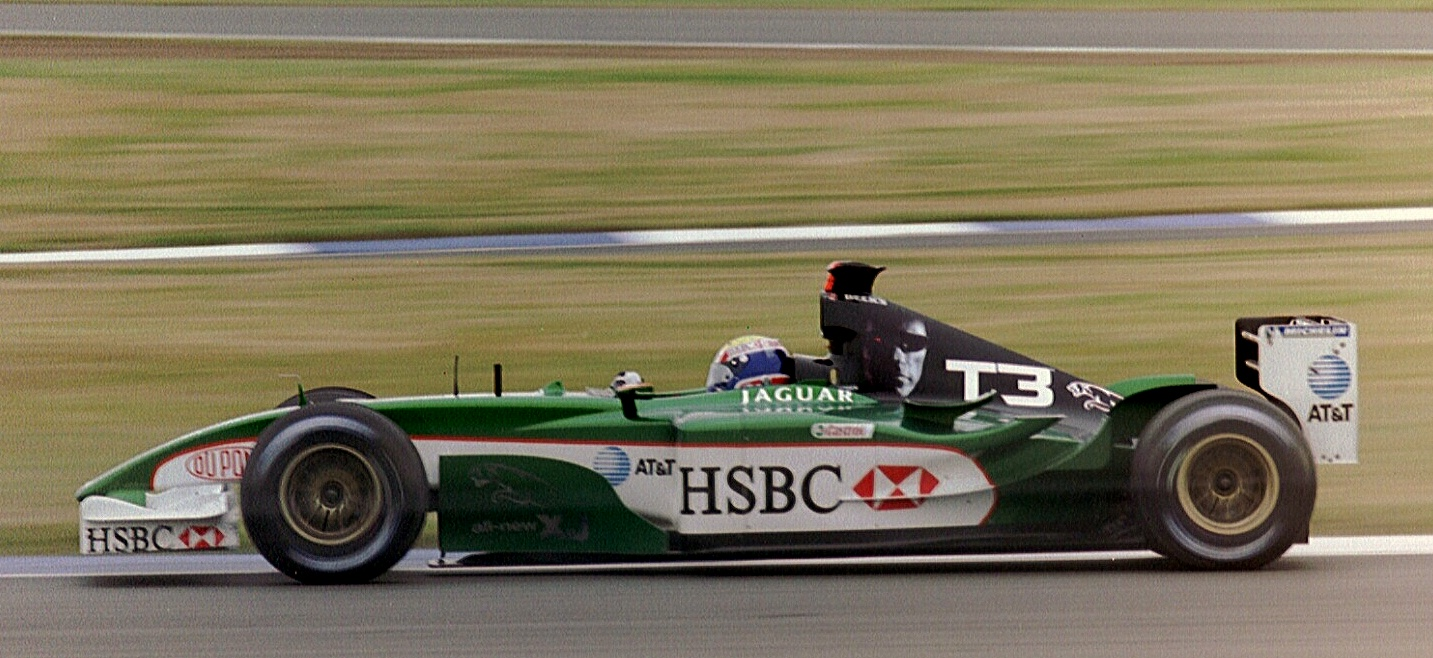
Mark Webber driving the Jaguar R4 with a special Terminator 3: Rise of the Machines engine cover at the 2003 British Grand Prix.

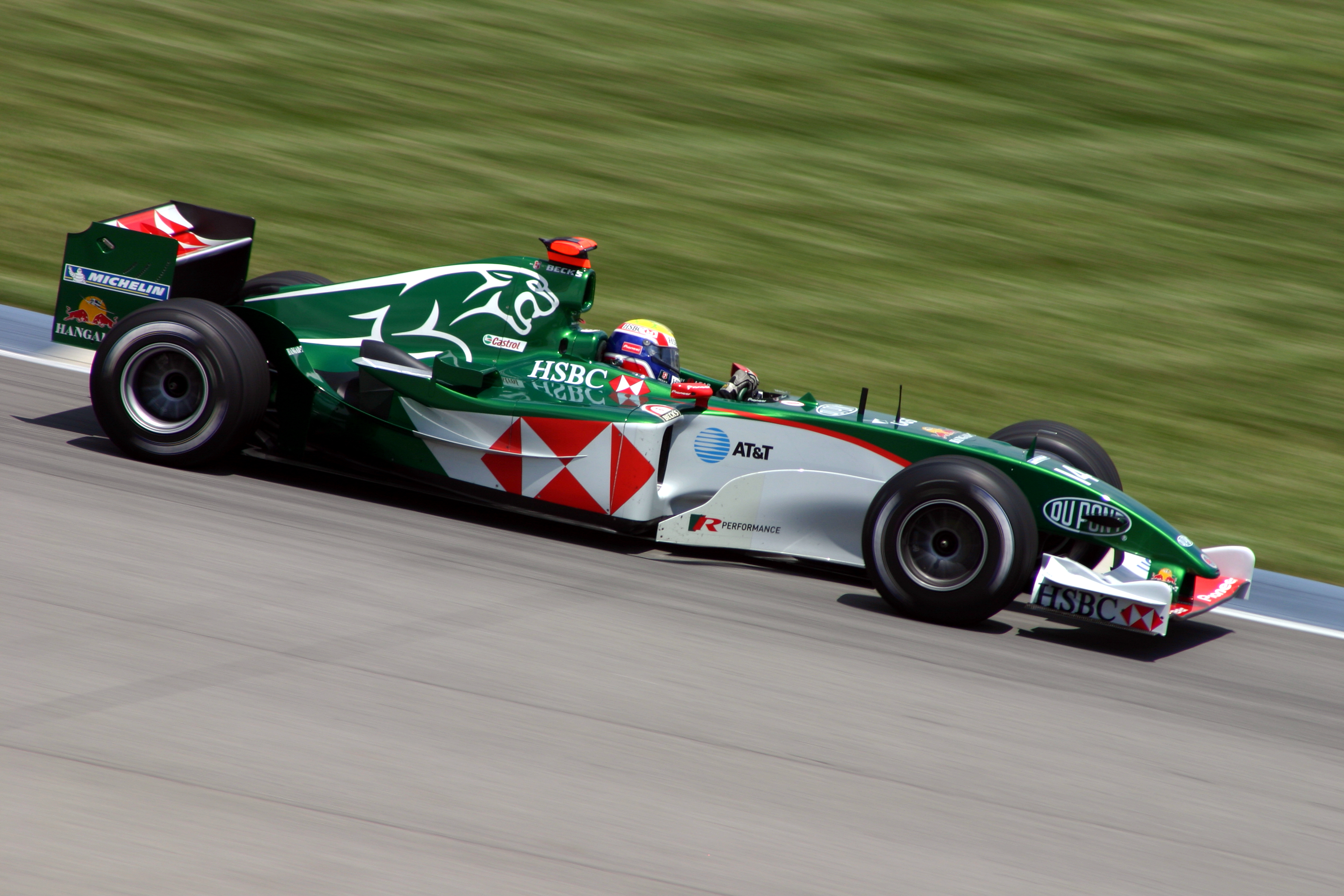
Mark Webber driving the Jaguar R5 at the 2004 United States Grand Prix.

== Jordan ==
Jordan Grand Prix competed in Formula One from 1991–2005. Both in 1991 and 1995 the Irish-licensed team entered cars painted in green, the racing colour of Ireland. Between 1997–2005, they were known for their distinctive bright yellow livery.

Year	Main colour(s)	Additional colour(s)	Livery sponsor(s)	Additional major sponsor(s)	Non-tobacco/alcohol livery changes
1991	Green	Blue	7-Up	FujiFilm, Visit Ireland, BP, Osama (a pen and calculator company based in Milan), Tic Tac, Brooksfield, CAPA, Shoei, City Hotels, De' Longhi, Ismoban, O.Z. Wheels	
1992–1993	Blue	White, Red	Sasol	Barclay, Philips Car Stereo, Kyosho (1992), Mitsui, Osama, Diavia, Arisco (1993), Unipart	Barclay was replaced with driver's surname
1994	Blue	Silver, White, Green, Aqua Green	Sasol	Arisco, Visit Ireland, Osama, Diavia, Unipart, ASR, Bruno Minelli, Ricardo, OMR Automotive, Fastar, Polti, Correios, A Storia, Tecno Ferrari, Glass Medic, Perar, Delicius	At the 1994 French GP, Visit Ireland was replaced with "Ireland 1 Italy 0", after Ireland's victory against Italy at the 1994 FIFA World Cup
1995	Aqua Green	White, Red, Blue	Peugeot	Beta Tools, Total, Kremlyovskaya Vodka, Ruffles, Polti, Diavia, Unipart, APE, Fujitsu ICL, Visit Ireland, Osama, ITC Ageco, Uliveto, Carrara, Hutchison	Kremlyovskaya Vodka logo was removed
1996	Gold (brighter yellow in opening races)	None	Benson & Hedges	Total, Davene, Peugeot, Goodyear, FIAMM, Diavia, Unipart, G de Z Capital, Corona, Control Techniques, BBS, Fox, GUAM, Pepsi, Lampo Zippers, Metagal	Benson & Hedges logo changed to special f1 and Jordan (on radiator) and driver surname plus 's on front wing and on engine cowling (for example: "Barrichello's")
1997–2004, 2005	Yellow	Black	Benson & Hedges (1997–2005), DHL (2002), Sobranie (2004–2005)	Total (1997), Repsol (1998), MasterCard (1997–2001), Deutsche Post (2000–2002), CCTV (2003), Ford (2003–2004), Galp Energia (2005), Peugeot (1997), Honda (2000–2002), Mugen (1998–1999), Tata (2005), G de Z Capital (1997–1999), s.Oliver (1997–1999), RTL (1997–1998), Control Techniques (1997–1998), BBS (1997), Pilsner Urquell (1999–2001), Liqui Moly (2002–2003, 2005), Danzas (2001), Damovo (2002–2003), Pearl (1999), Hewlett-Packard (1997–2001), Brother (2000–2003), Trust (2004), Intercond (1999–2000), European Aviation (1999), Zepter (1999–2000), PlayStation (1999–2000), Vodka V-10 (2003–2004), Gametrac (2003), RE/MAX (2003–2005), Ennistown Stud (2003), Libid-X.com (2004–2005), Carrefour Health Club (2003–2004), Speed (2005), Autocar (2005), Phard (2004), FZA Morse (2003), Moretti (2003), Sicily Tourism (2003), Portugal Tourism (2005), Shanghai International Circuit (2003), Steelback (2005), Imation (2000–2002), PURAC (2000), Brembo (2000), NatWest (1998–1999), Anglian Water (2000), Avex Group (1999), Lucent (2000–2001), Infineon (2001), Delphi (1998), Scania (1998), GdeZ (1998), Showa (1998), Serra (1998)	Benson & Hedges logo changed to "Bitten Hisses" or to snake-related puns with driver surnames such as "Fisssssi" and "Sssssschuey" (1997), "Buzzing Hornets" (1998 to 2000), "Bitten Heroes" (2001), and "Be On Edge" (2002 to 2005), Sobranie logo changed to "Be On Edge", replaced with the driver's given name or removed completely (2005), "200" at the 2001 USA GP (only on Jean Alesi's car for his 200th F1 start), "Lazarus" in the first races of 2004; The team used special livery with American flag decals for 2001 Italian Grand Prix and 2001 United States Grand Prix in remembrance of the 11 September 2001 attacks in the United States. At the 2005 Canadian Grand Prix, the slogan "Bring Back Hockey" was printed on the airbox as a reaction to the 2004–05 NHL lockout. Sobranie replaced Benson & Hedges at the 2004 and 2005 United States Grands Prix due to U.S. Tobacco Master Settlement Agreement conflicts.

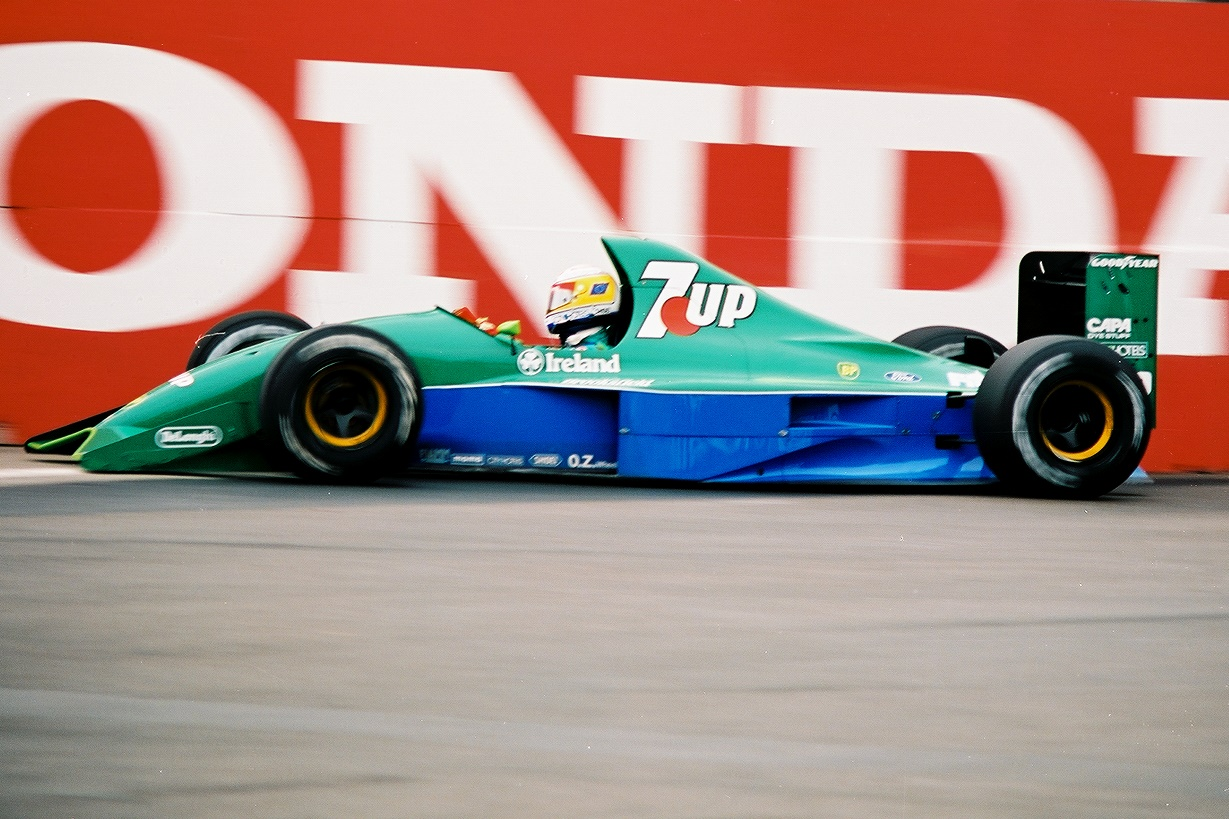
Bertrand Gachot driving the Jordan 191 at the 1991 USA Grand Prix

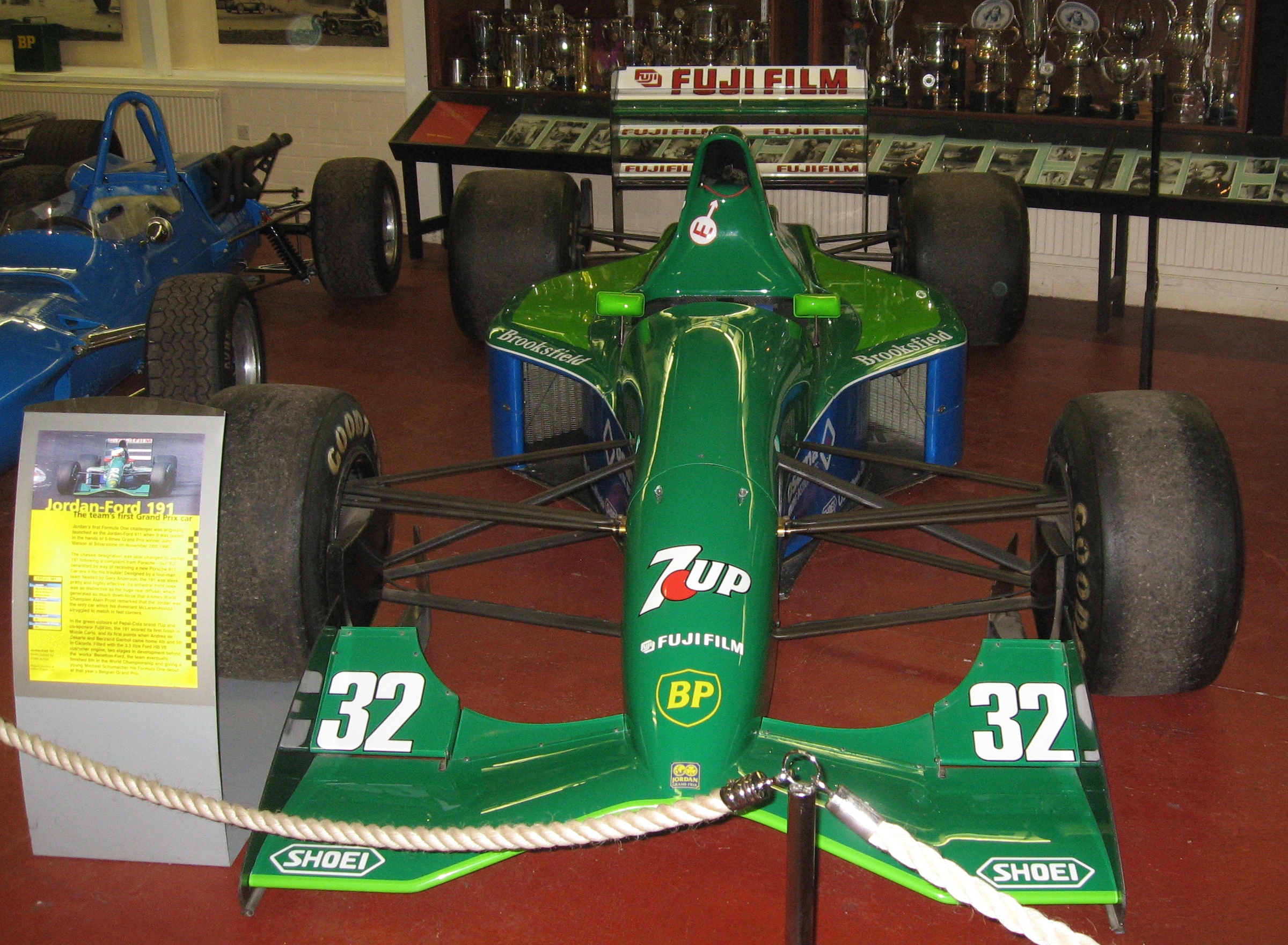
A Jordan 191 in display

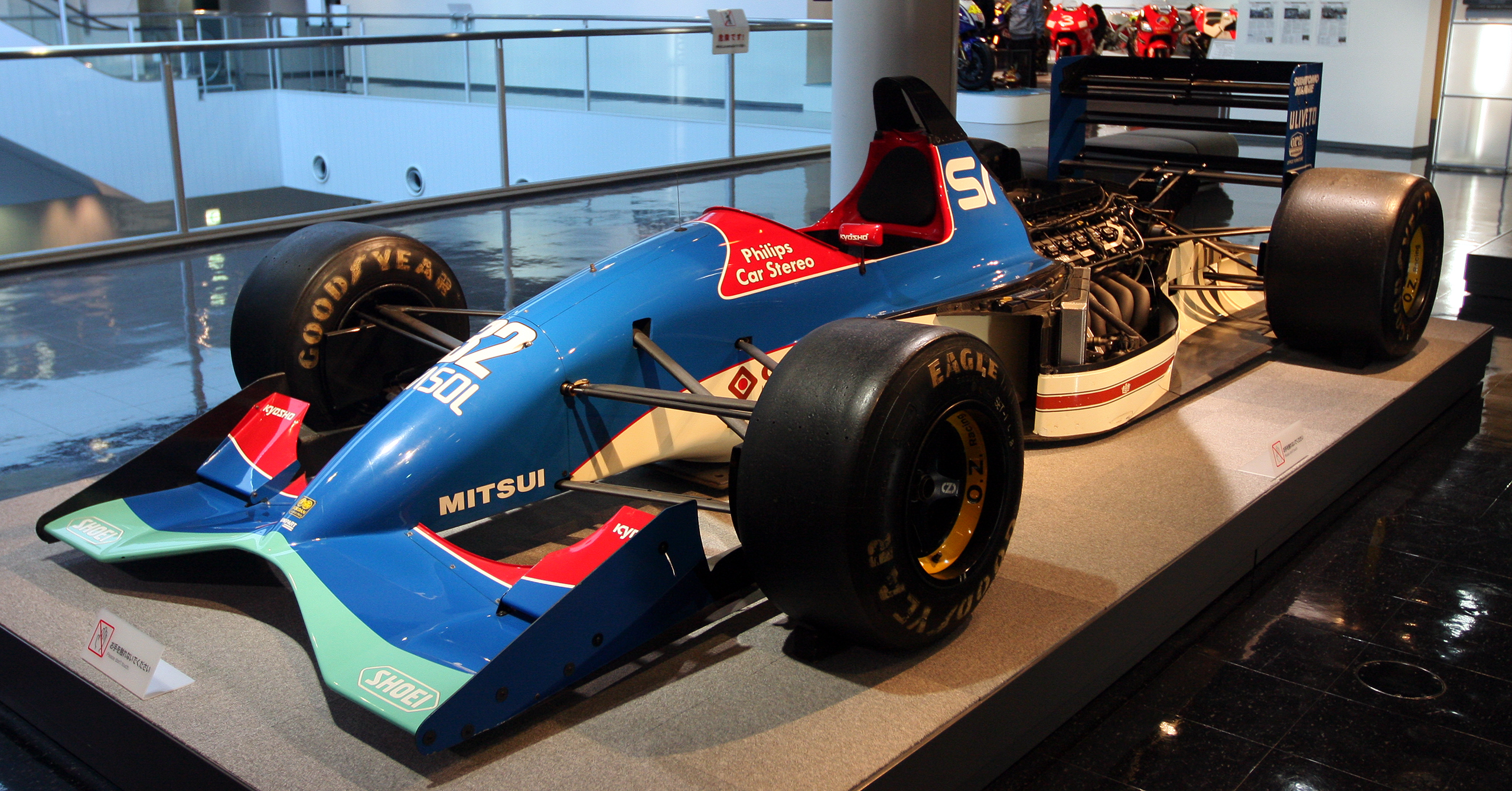
The Jordan 192 with its engine exposed at Yamaha communication Plaza

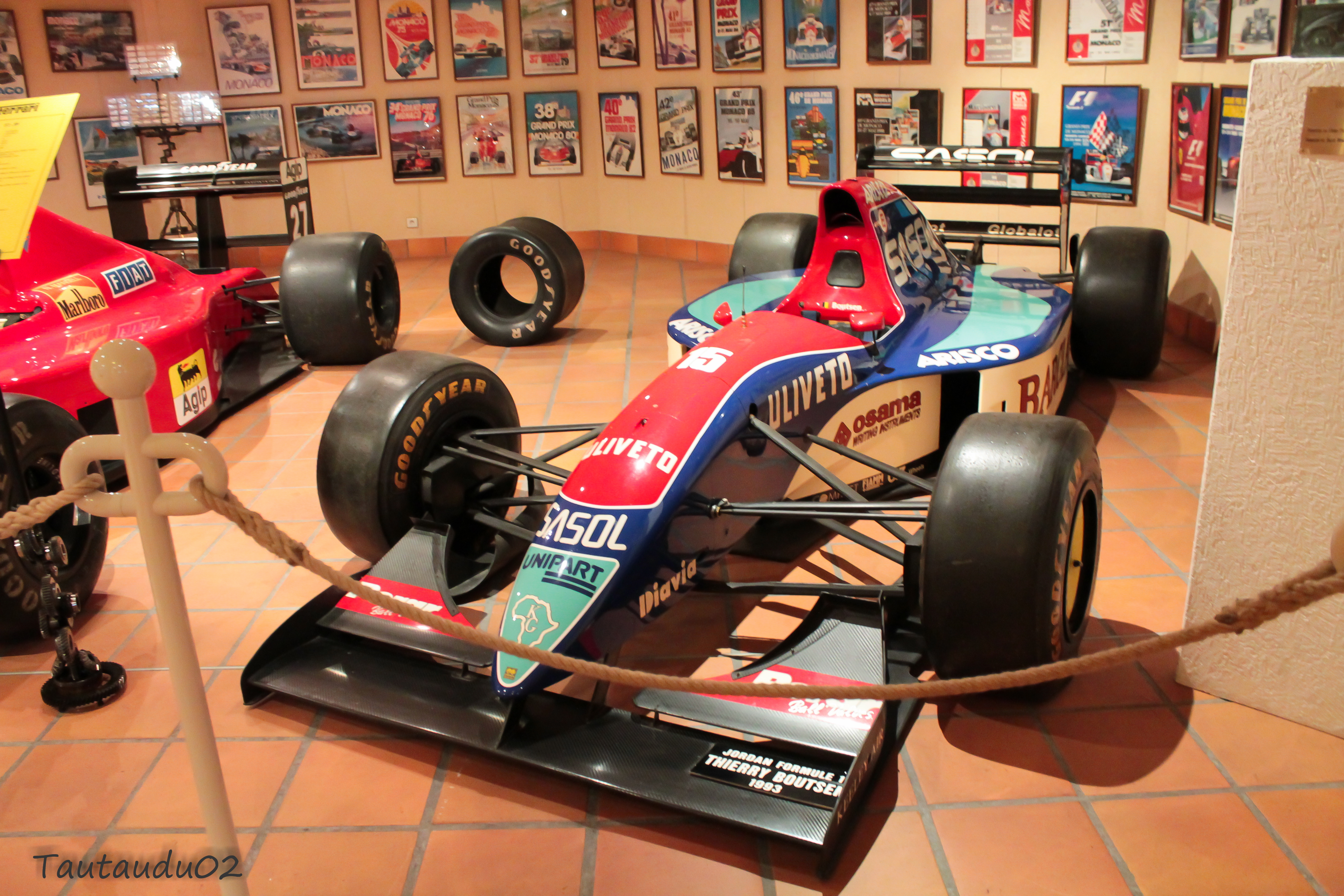
Thierry Boutsen's Jordan 193 on display at the Automobile Museum in Monaco

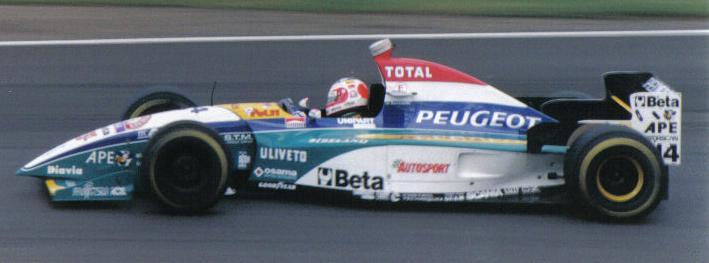
Rubens Barrichello driving the Jordan 195 at the 1995 British Grand Prix with aqua green livery.

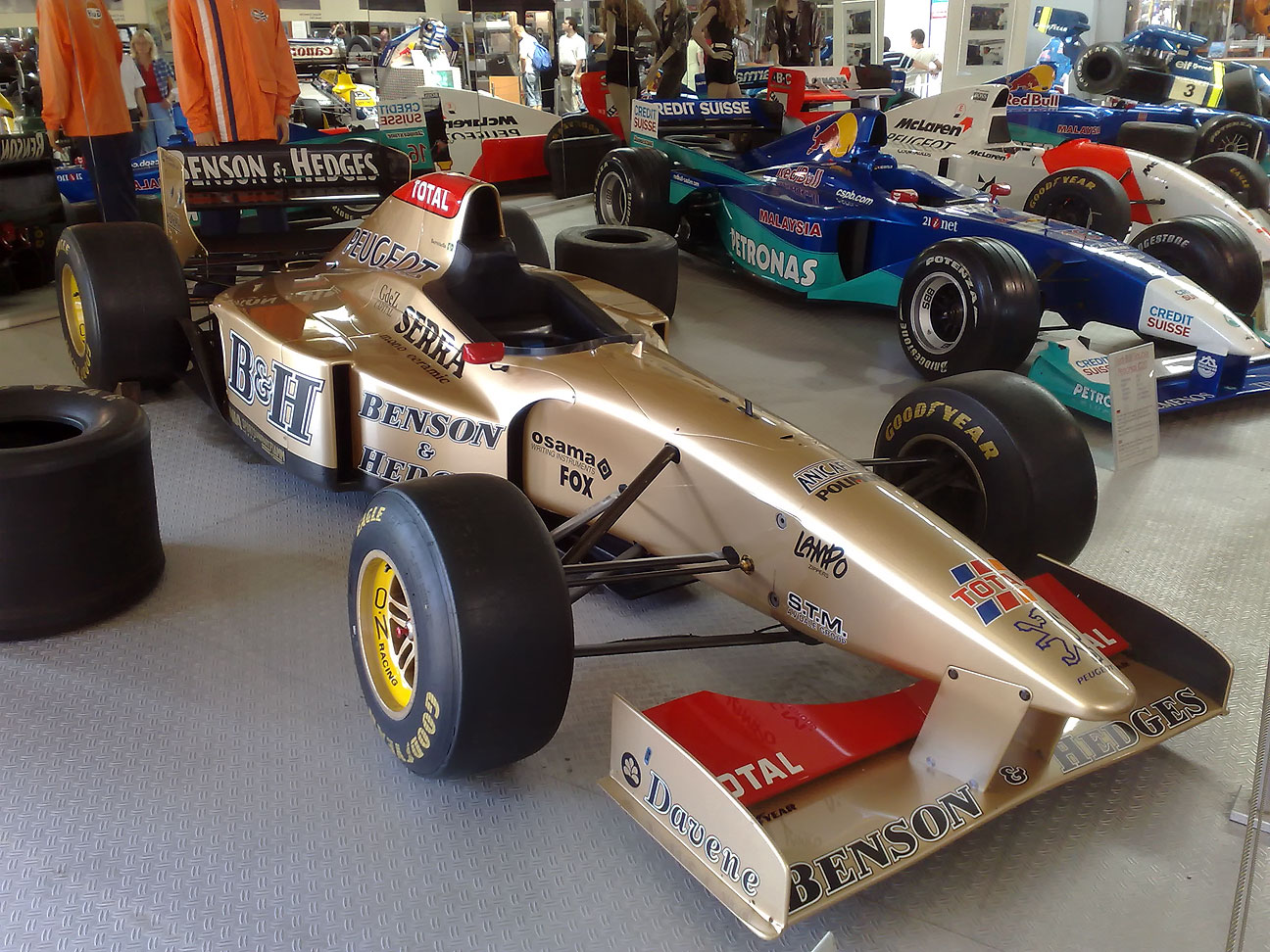
From 1996, Bensons and Hedges sponsored Jordan, This is the Jordan 196 from 1996 season with its golden livery

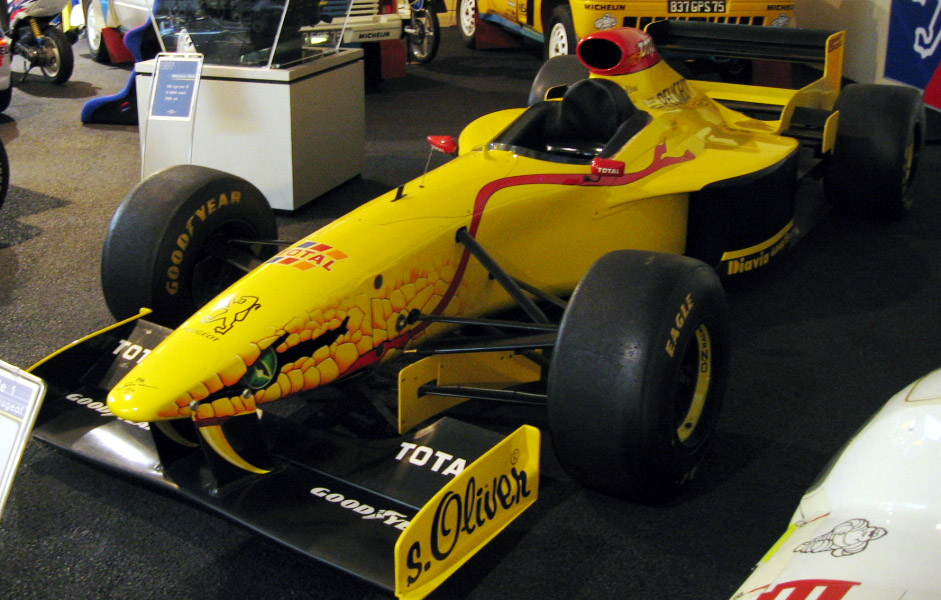
Jordan introduced nose arts from 1997 to 2001, this is a Jordan 197 painted with Bitten Hisses livery

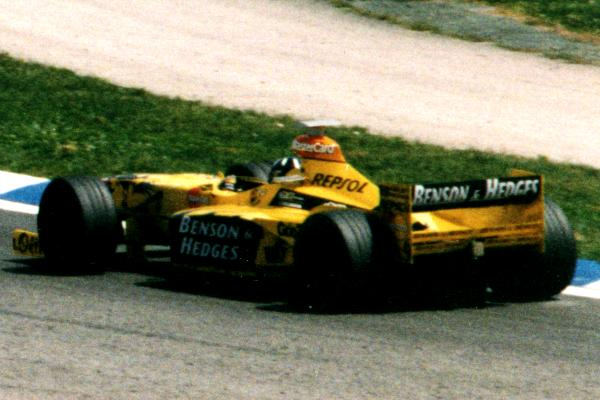
Damon Hill driving the Jordan 198 at the 1998 Spanish Grand Prix.

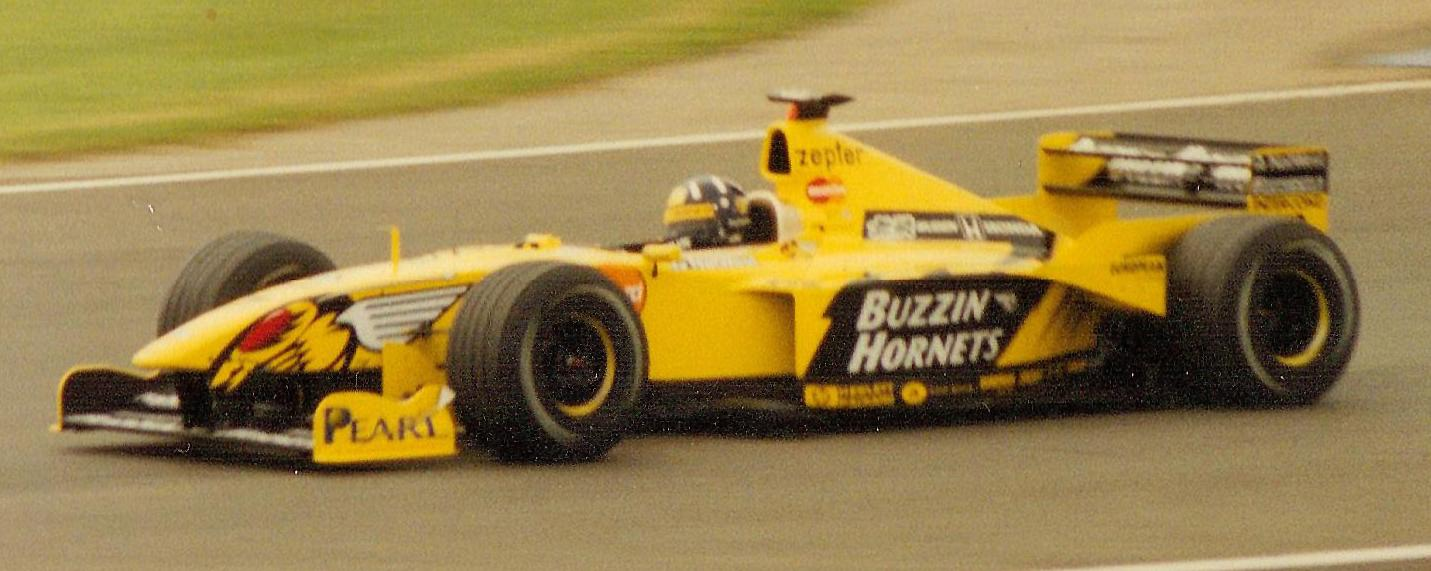
Damon Hill driving the Jordan 199 at the 1999 British Grand Prix with "Buzzing Hornets" livery.

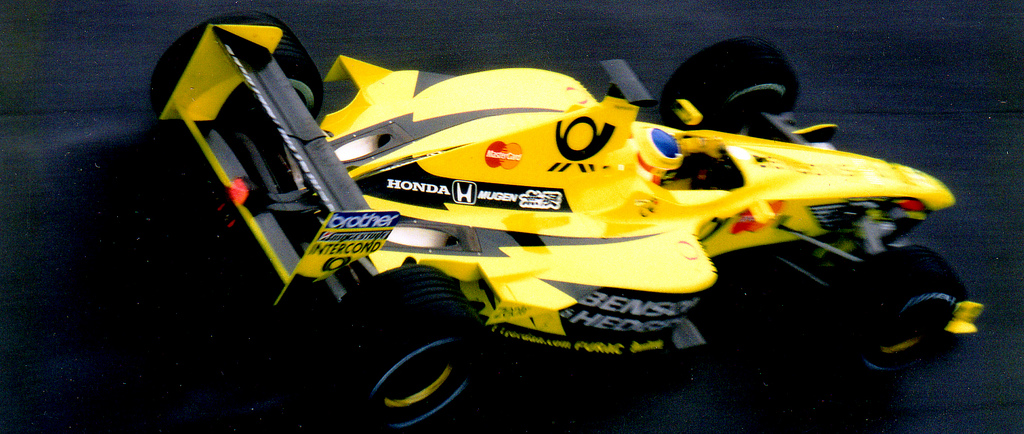
Jarno Trulli driving the Jordan EJ10 at the 2000 Italian Grand Prix.

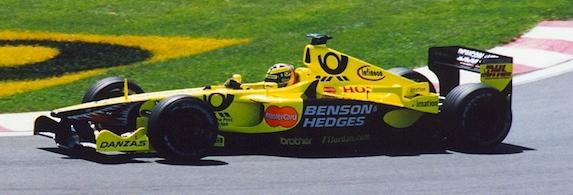
Heinz-Harald Frentzen driving the Jordan EJ11 at the 2001 Canadian Grand Prix with "Bitten Heroes" livery.

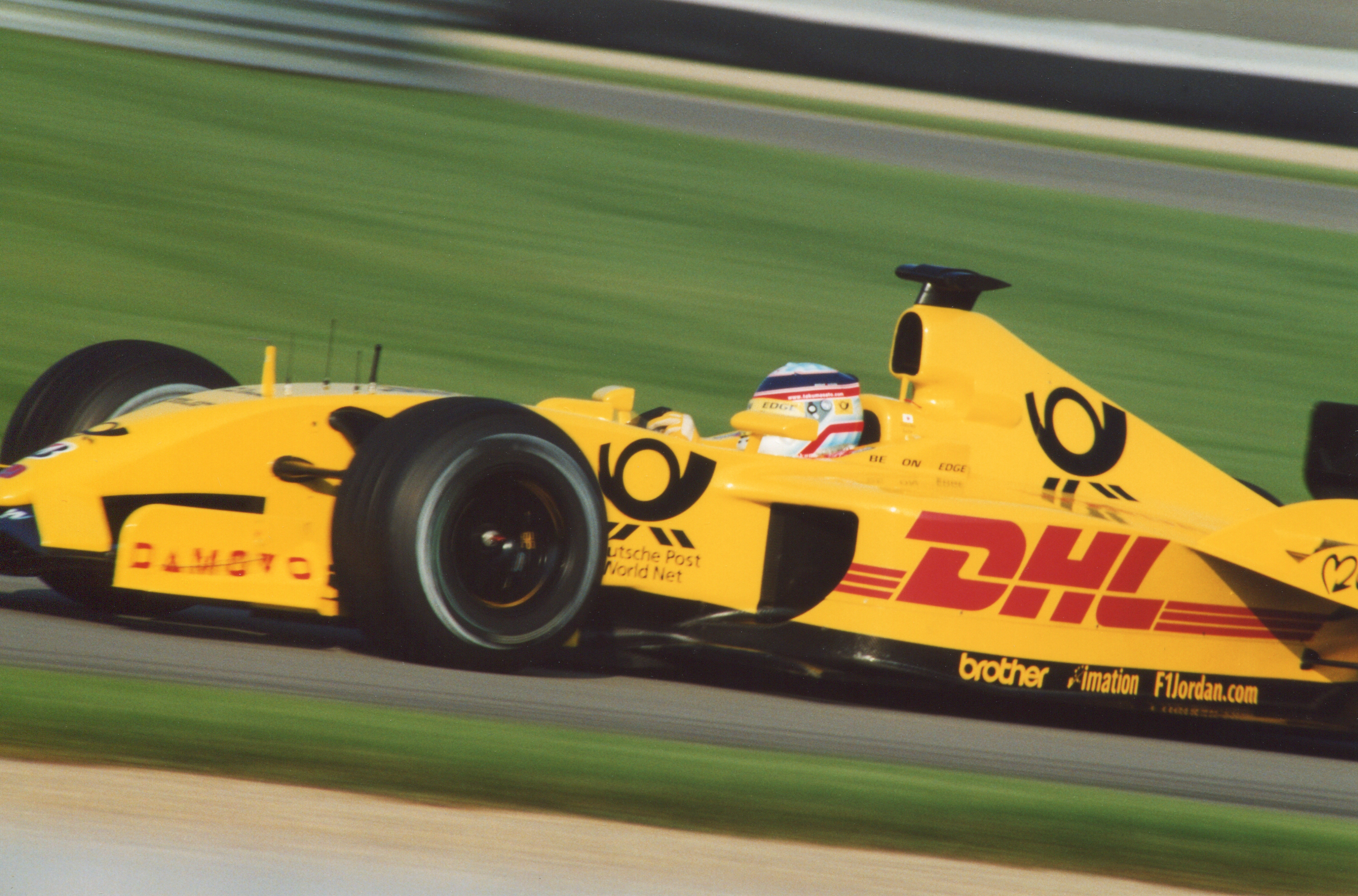
Takuma Sato driving the Jordan EJ12 at the 2002 United States Grand Prix.

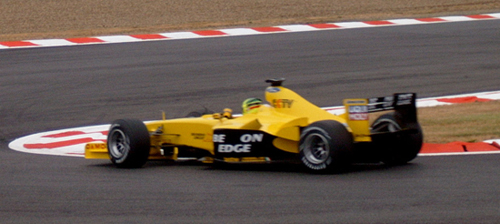
Ralph Firman's Jordan EJ13 shows the non-tobacco "Be On Edge" livery at the 2003 French Grand Prix.

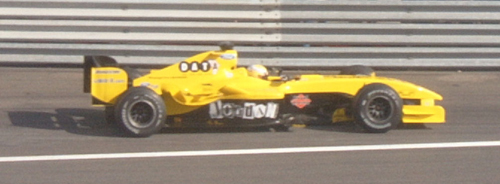
Giorgio Pantano driving the Jordan EJ14 at the 2004 French Grand Prix. You can see the lack of sponsorship on the sidepods, which instead has a Jordan logo.

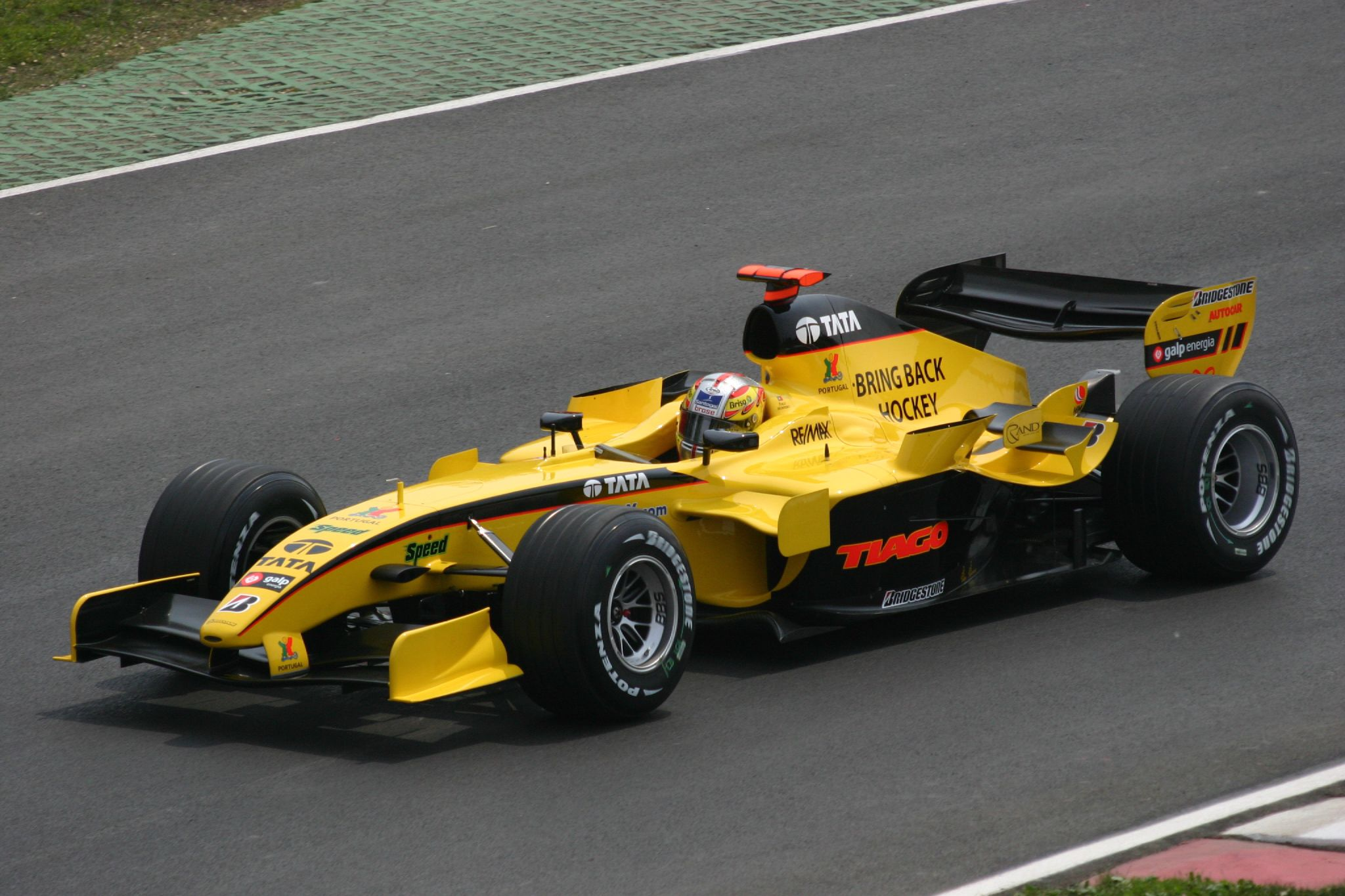
Tiago Monteiro driving the Jordan EJ15 at the 2005 Canadian Grand Prix without Sobranie livery, but with the "Bring Back Hockey" slogan.

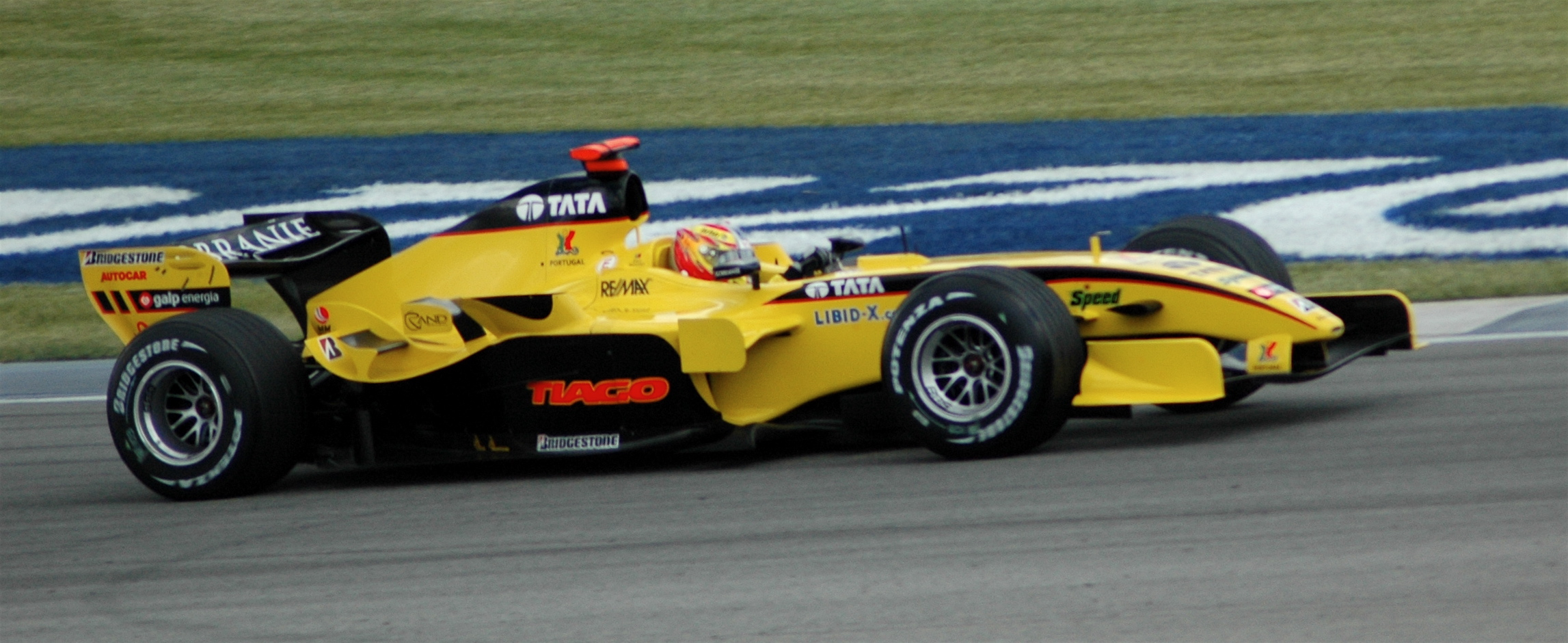
Tiago Monteiro in the EJ15 at the 2005 United States Grand Prix, this time with the Sobranie livery applied to the rear wing.

== Larrousse ==
Year	Main colour(s)	Additional colour(s)	Livery sponsor(s)	Additional major sponsor(s)	Non Tobacco/Alcohol changes(s)
1987	Blue	Red	Elkron, Daniel Hechter, Seine Maritime	BP	
1988	Blue	Red, Yellow, Green	Elkron, Camel, Adia	BP, Rhône-Poulenc, Seine Maritime	
1989	Blue	Red, Yellow, Green	Camel, Adia	BP, Seine Maritime, Goodyear, Lamborghini, Haute Normandie	
1990	Blue	Red, Green, Yellow	Toshiba	BP, Unisys, Adia, Towa, Goodyear, TDK, Espo Communications, Geo Corporation, Ghidini, Viel & cie, Rhone-Poulenc	
1991	Blue	Red, Green	Toshiba	BP, Unisys, Orangina, Central Park, Adia, Rizla+	
1992	Blue, Yellow	Red, Green	Venturi, Hype Energy	BP, Unisys, Orangina, Central Park, Adia, Goodyear, Chrysler, Zent, Apan777, Cabin, Lamborghini	
1993	Blue, Yellow	Red, Green	Zanussi	BP, Unisys, Goodyear, Chrysler, Rizla+	
1994	Red, White	Black, Green	Kronenburg, Zanussi	Ford, Goodyear, Adidas, Elf Aquitaine, Rizla+, Eurosport	
1994 (non-alcohol/tobacco races)	Green	Blue, Gold	Tourtel, Zanussi, Speedy	Ford, Goodyear, PACA, Adidas, Elf Aquitaine, Gauloises Blondes, Rizla+	In countries where advertising alcohol or tobacco is forbidden, Larrousse used the Tourtel livery

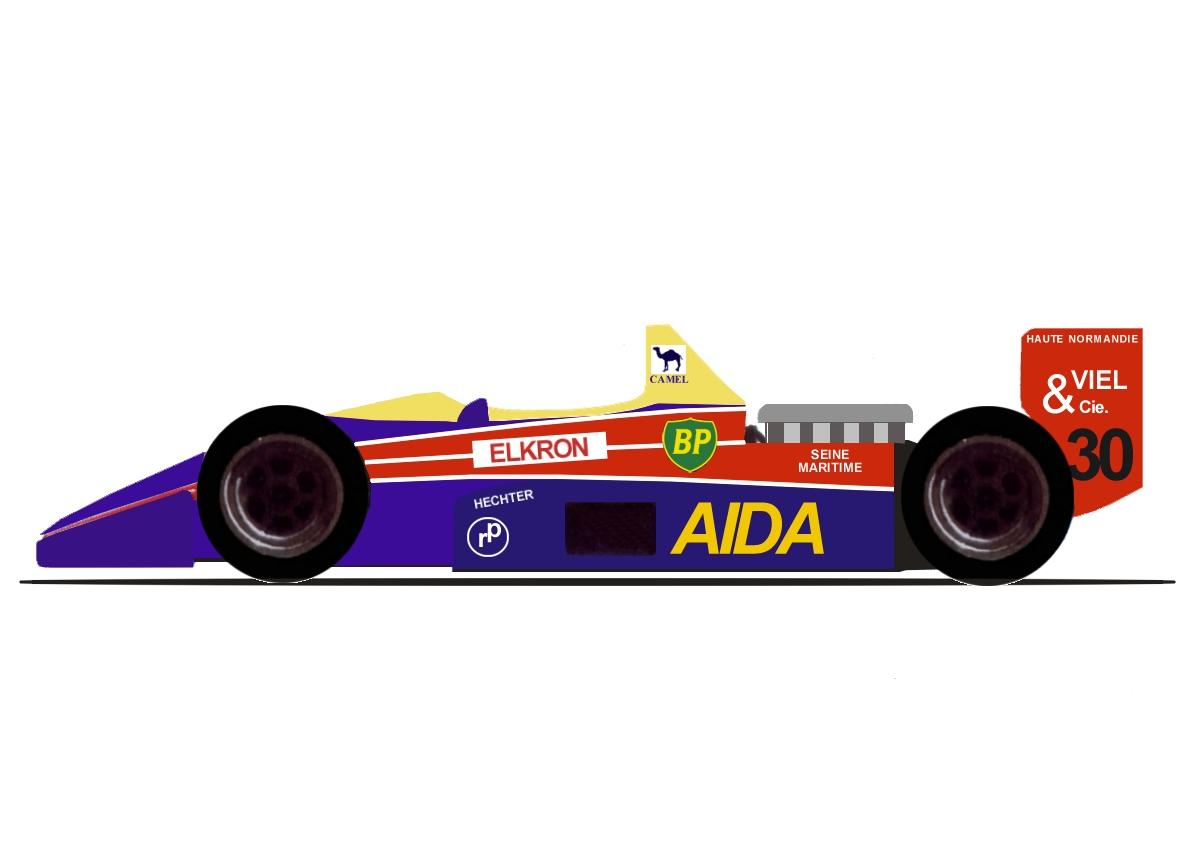
A Larrousse LC88 from the 1988 F1 Season

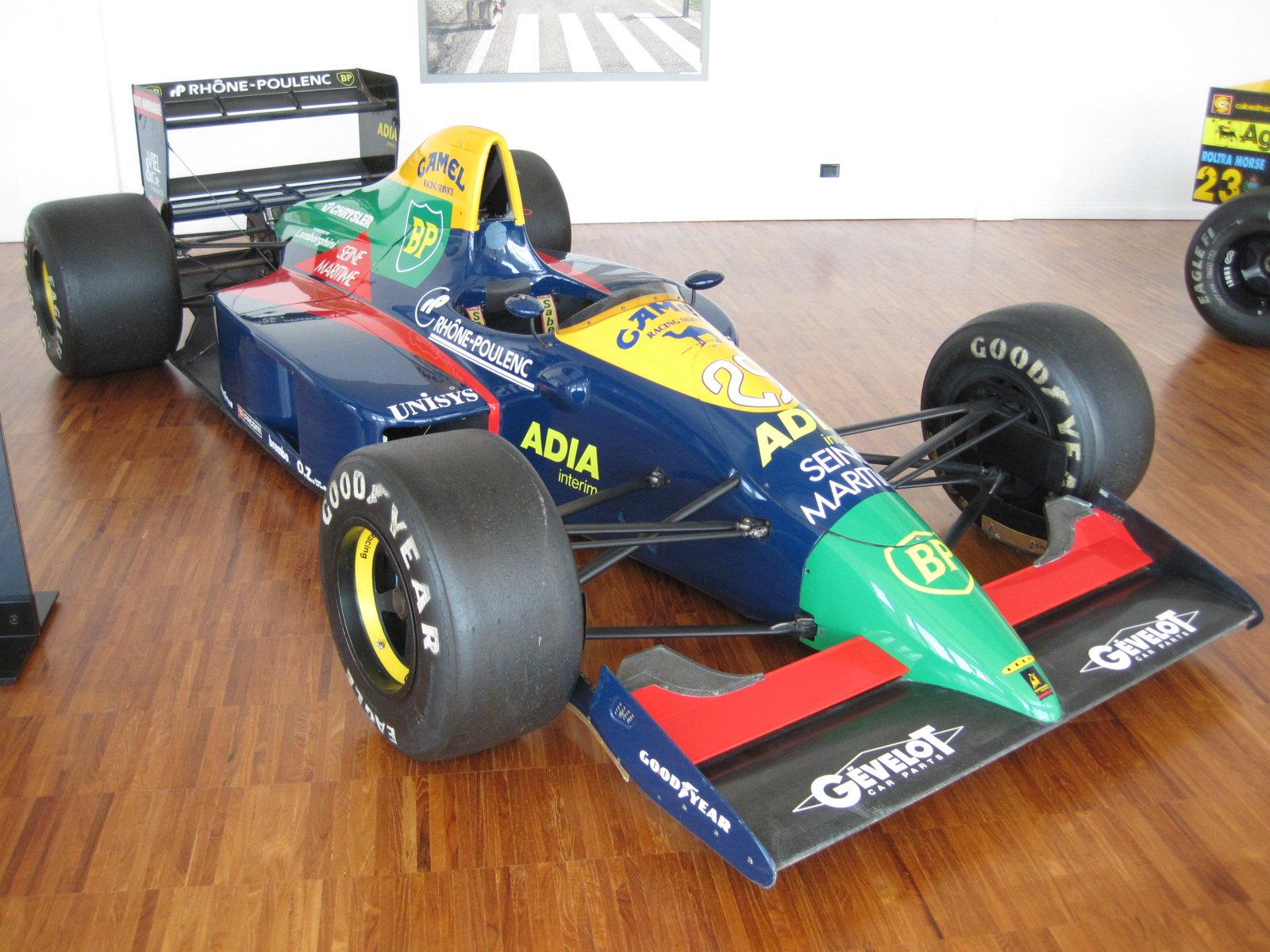
The Larrousse LC89 in the Lamborghini Museum

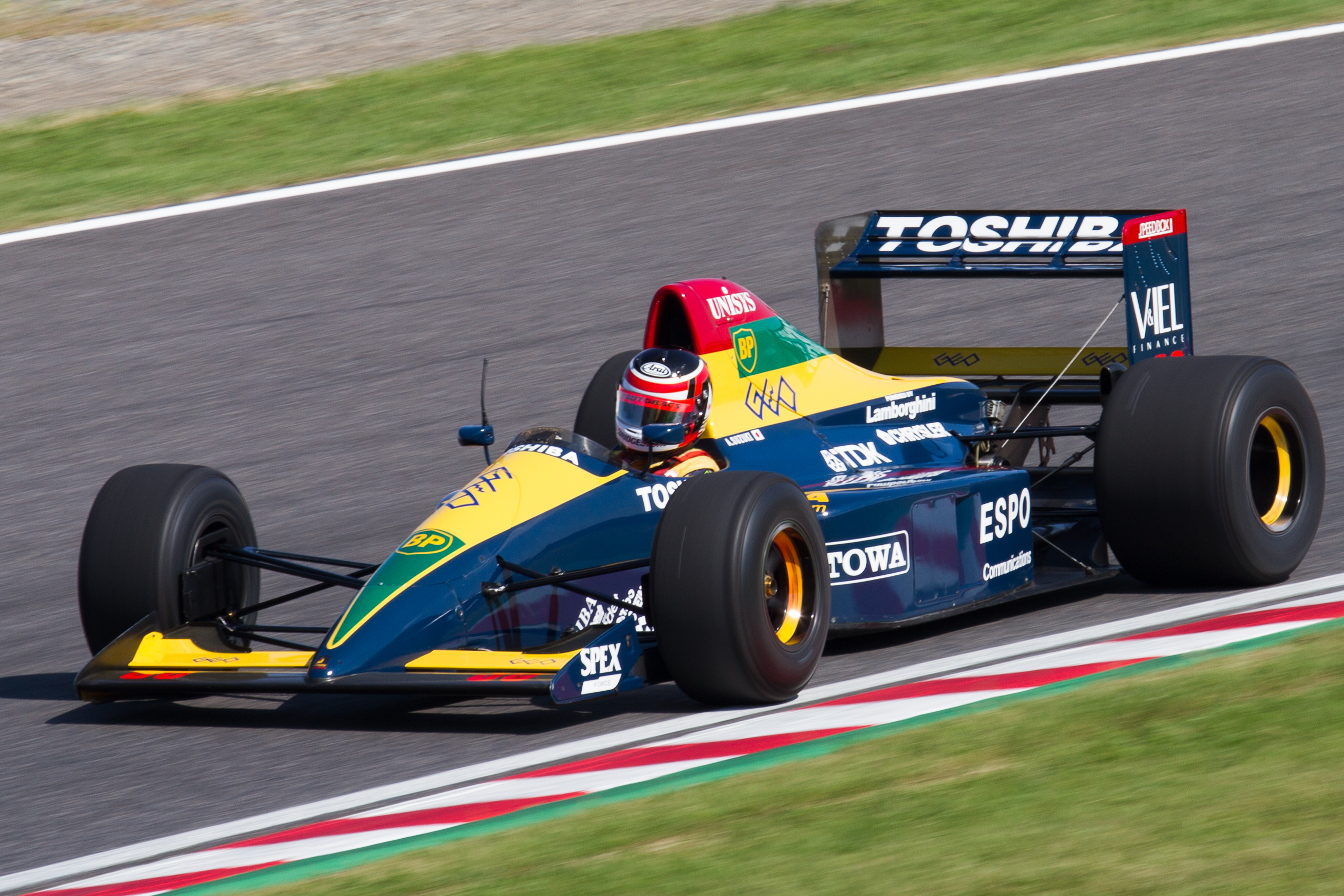
The Larrousse LC90 being demonstrated by Aguri Suzuki in Suzuka.

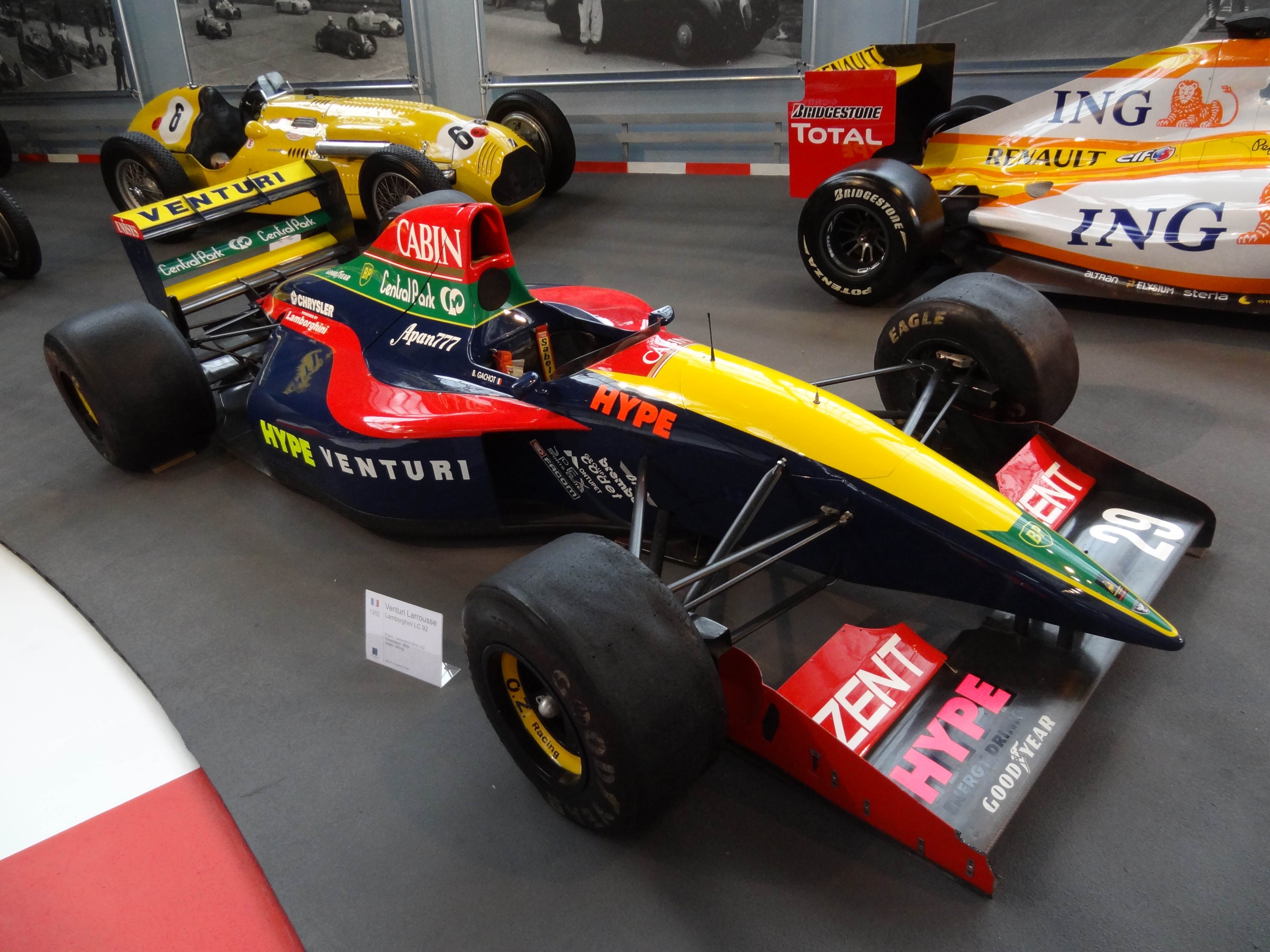
The Larrousse LC92 from the 1992 season at the Autoworld in Brussels

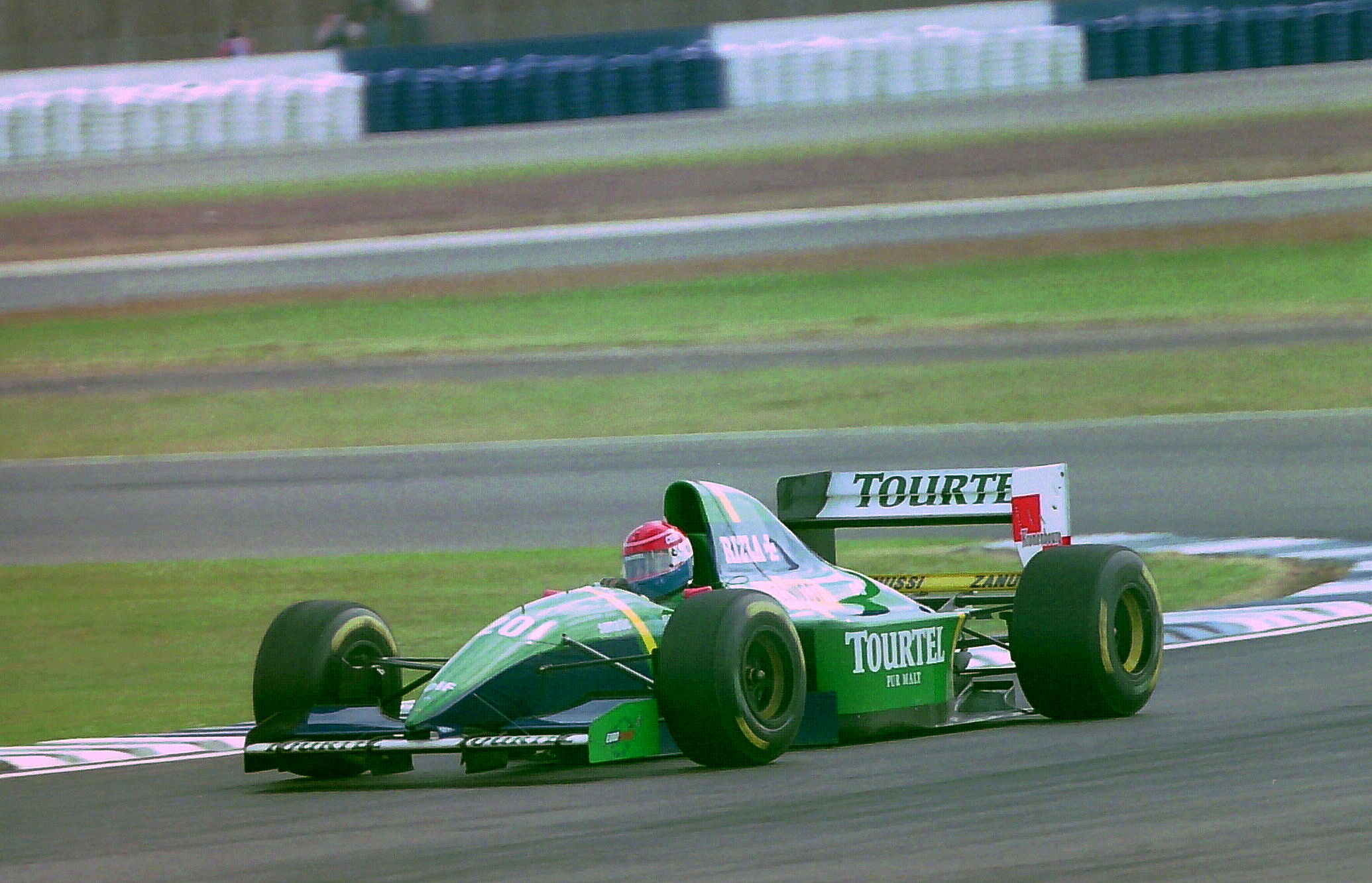
Érik Comas at the 1994 British Grand Prix

== LEC ==
LEC was a Formula One team and constructor from the United Kingdom. They participated in ten Grands Prix, using a March in 1973. In 1977 they built their own car, the LEC CRP1.

Year	Main colour(s)	Additional colour(s)	Main sponsor(s)	Additional major sponsor(s)	Non-tobacco/alcohol livery changes
1977	Blue	White, Red	LEC Refrigeration	Goodyear, Champion, Koni	

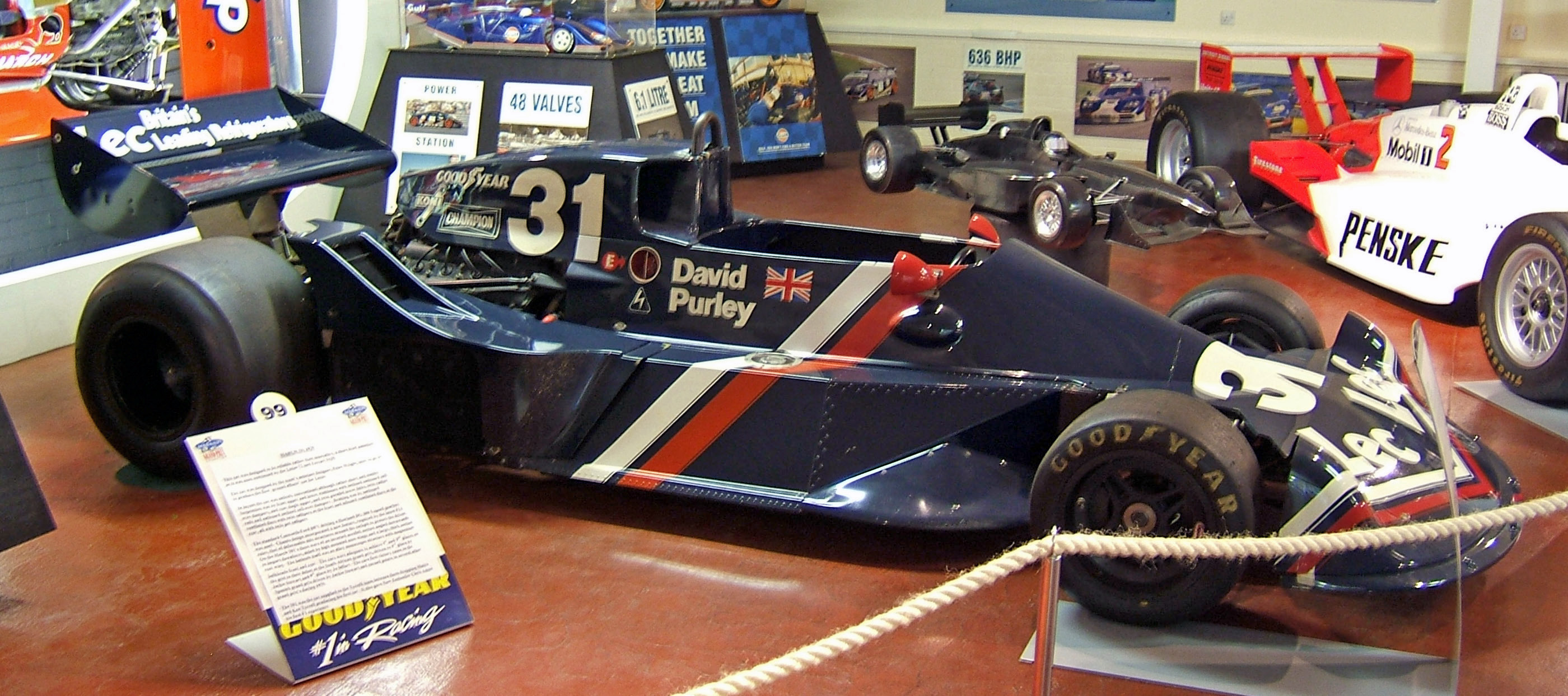
The LEC CRP1 from the 1977 season.

== Life ==
Year	Main colour(s)	Additional colour(s)	Main sponsor(s)	Additional major sponsor(s)	Non-tobacco/alcohol livery changes
1990	Red	Black	Albini & Fontanot, Life – Pic	Agip, Goodyear, Beta Tools, ICM, Champion, TDD, Nardi Borelli	

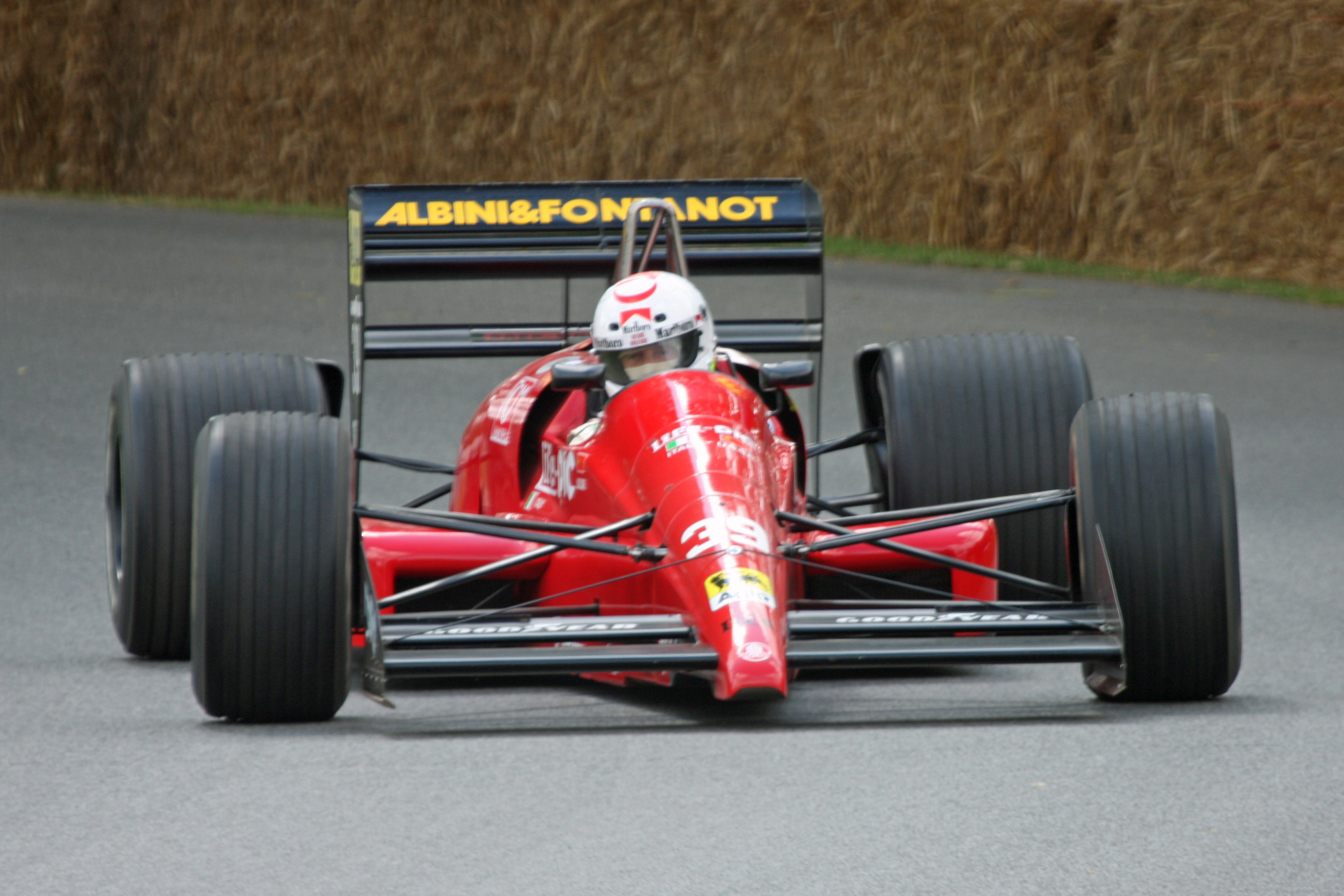
The Life L190 being demonstrated at Goodwood Festival of Speed 2009.

== Ligier ==
Ligier always raced with the Bleu de France, the national racing colour of France, with red, black or white parts.

Year	Main colour(s)	Additional colour(s)	Livery sponsor(s)	Additional major sponsor(s)	Non-tobacco/alcohol livery changes
1976–1991	Blue	White, Red (1982, 1984)	Gitanes	Norev (1977), Elf (1979–83, 1986–1990), Talbot (1980–1982), Michelin, Matra (1977–82), Café do Brasil (1983), LOTO (1984–1990), Ligier, Antar (1984–1985, 1989), Goodyear (1987–1990), Ricard (1986), Pirelli (1985–1986), Renault (1984–1990)	
1991–1995	Blue, White (1993)	White, Blue (1993), Black (1991, 1993), Red (1992, 1994)	Gitanes Blondes, Ligier, Zenith (1993), Les Pages Jaunes (1993), LOTO (1992, 1994–1995) Elf Aquitaine	Kickers, Mugen (1995), Goodyear, Giordana, Lamborghini (1991), Renault (1992–1994), Speedy (1995), Albatros (1995)	Gitanes text was removed (1991–1993), Gitanes logo with a barcode over name (1994–1995), or "Gitanes" was replaced with "Ligier" and the Gitanes logo was replaced with a man with the French flag (1995)
1993 (Japan GP and Australia GP)	White	Light Blue, Black	Gitanes	None	This Livery designed by Hugo Pratt was used only by Martin Brundle
1996	Blue	White, Yellow	Gauloises, Ligier, Parmalat, Elf Aquitaine	Kickers, Mugen, Goodyear, Giordana, Arisco, Amik, Fontana Bulloneria, Cricket & co, GUAM, BBS, Brembo, NGK, Tom Walkinshaw Racing	"Gauloises" was replaced with "Ligier"

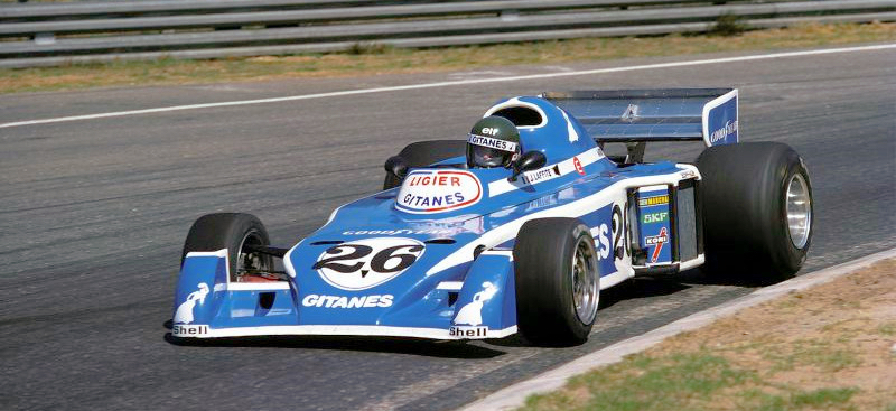
Jacques Laffite drives for Ligier at the 1976 Italian Grand Prix

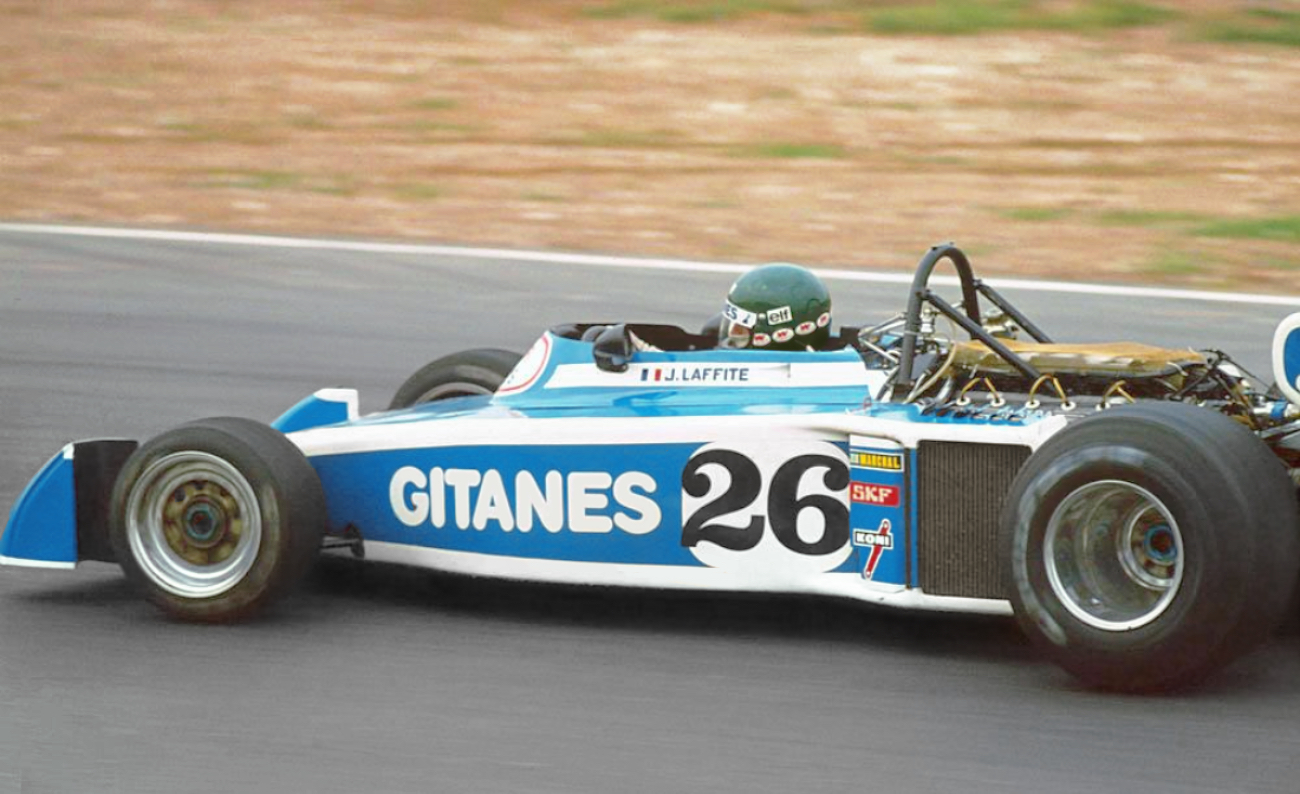
Jacques Laffite drives the Ligier JS7/9 in 1978

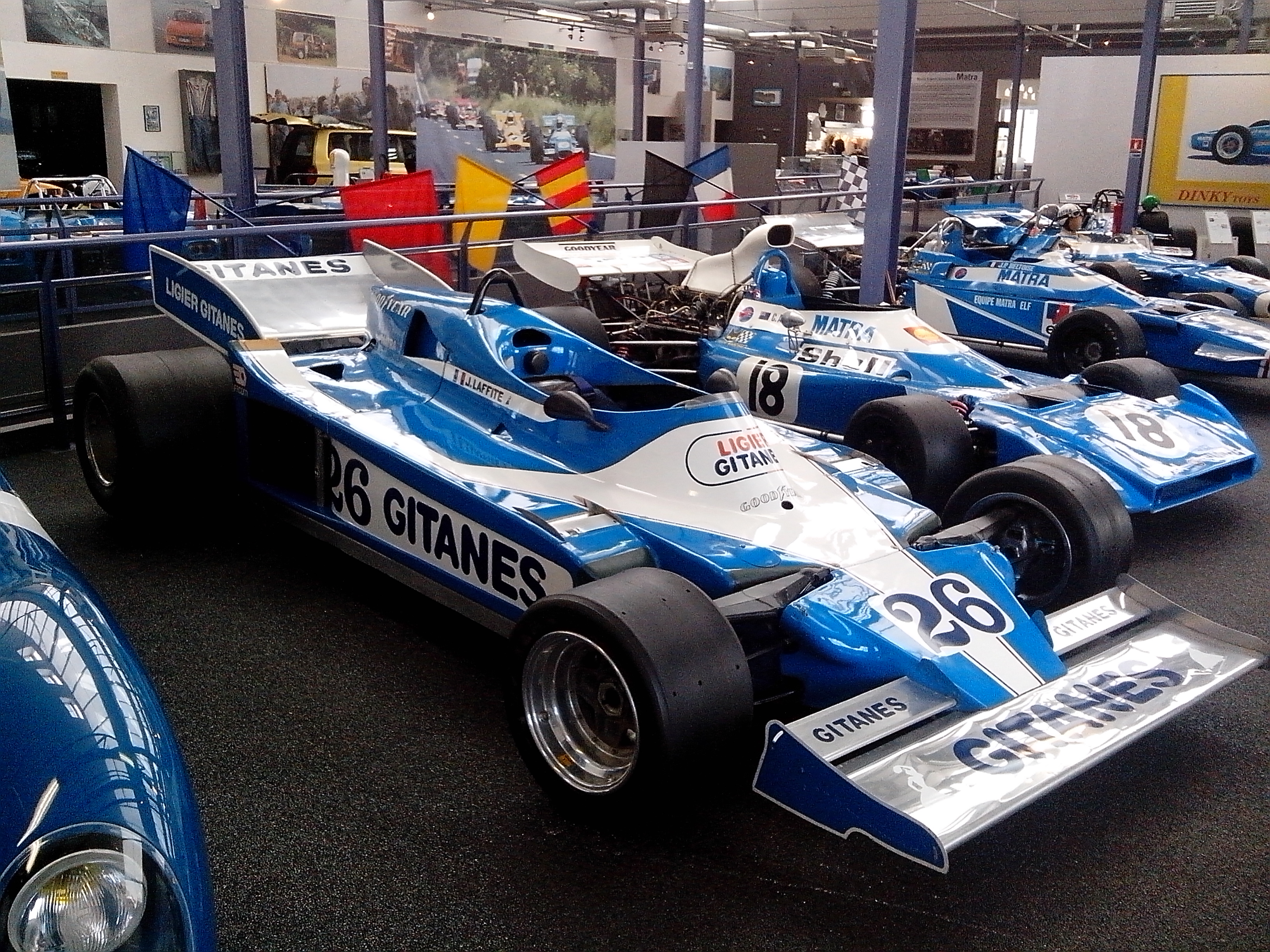
A Ligier JS9 from the 1978 season in display at the MATRA Museum.

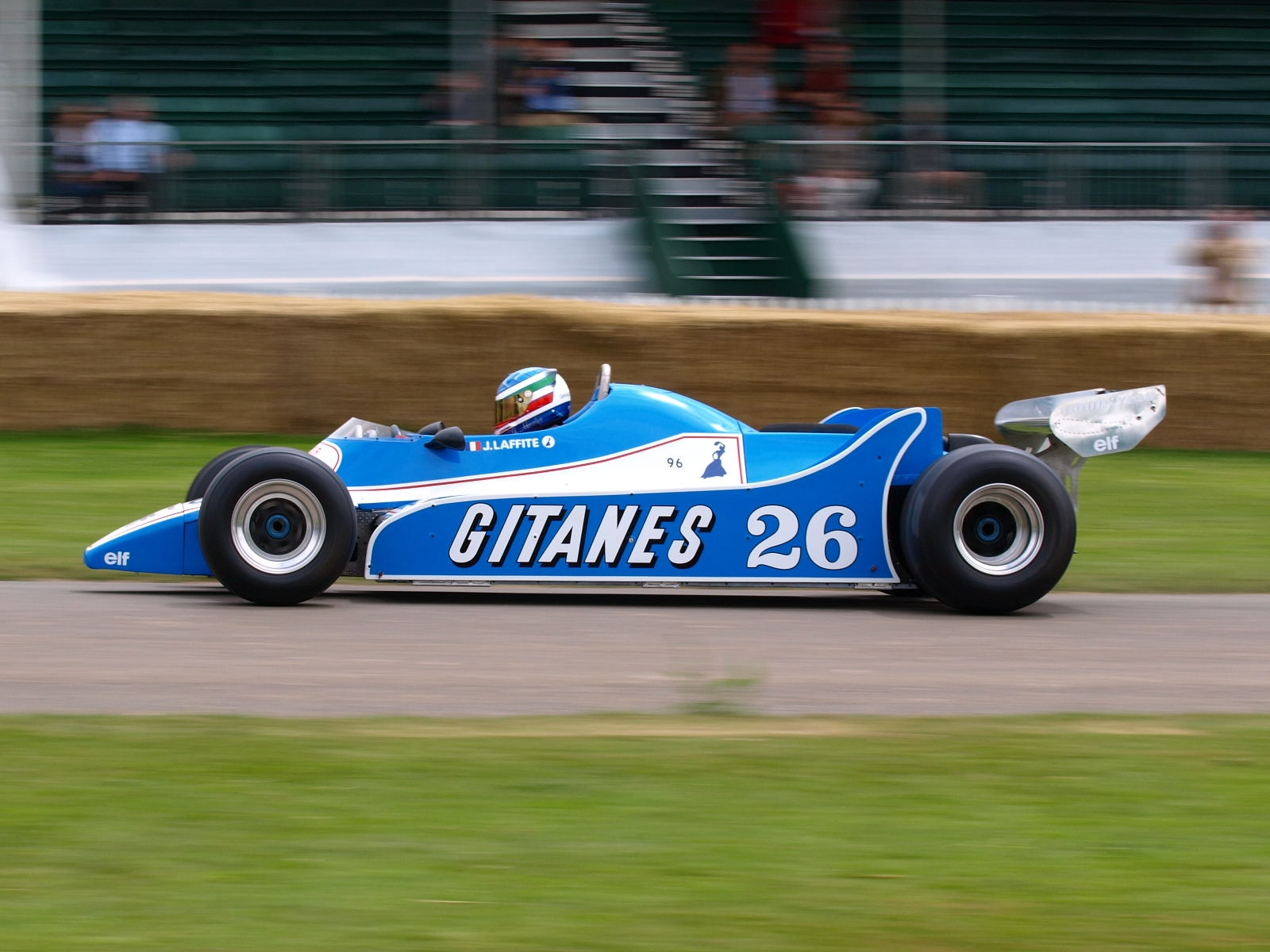
The 1979 Ligier JS11 being demonstrated at the 2008 Goodwood Festival of Speed.

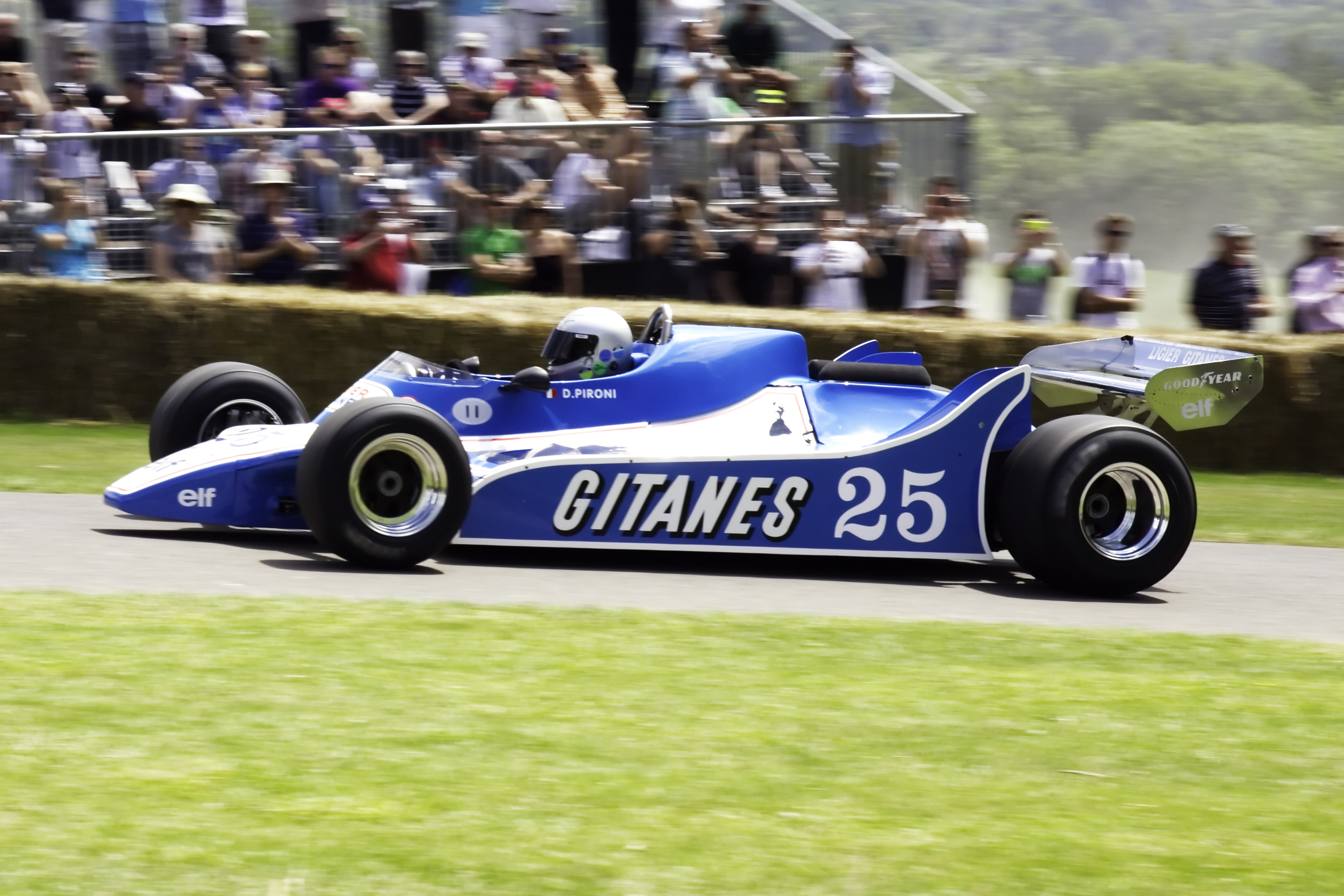
The 1980 Ligier JS11/15 being demonstrated

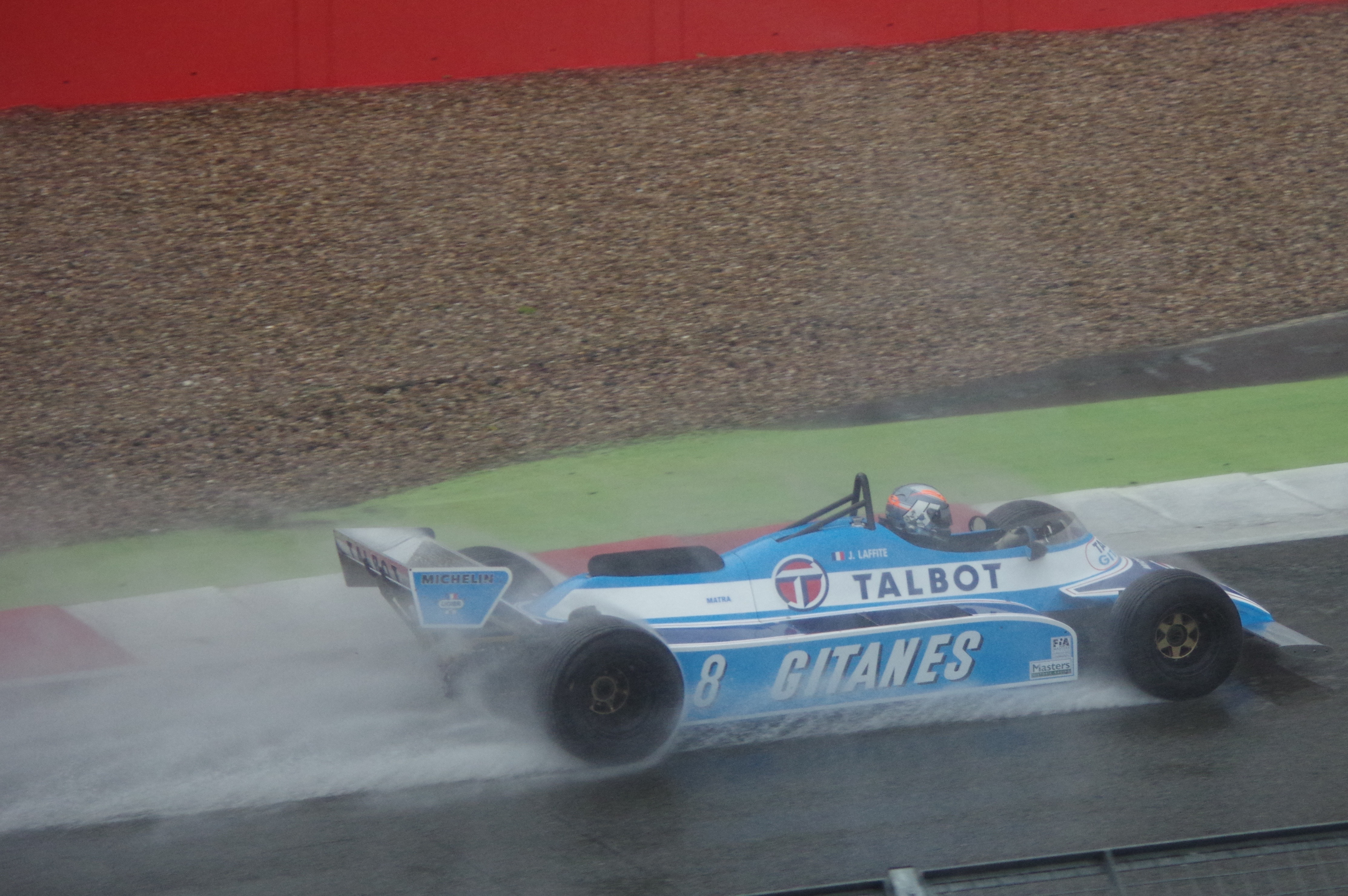
A Ligier JS17 being demonstrated at Silverstone in 2015

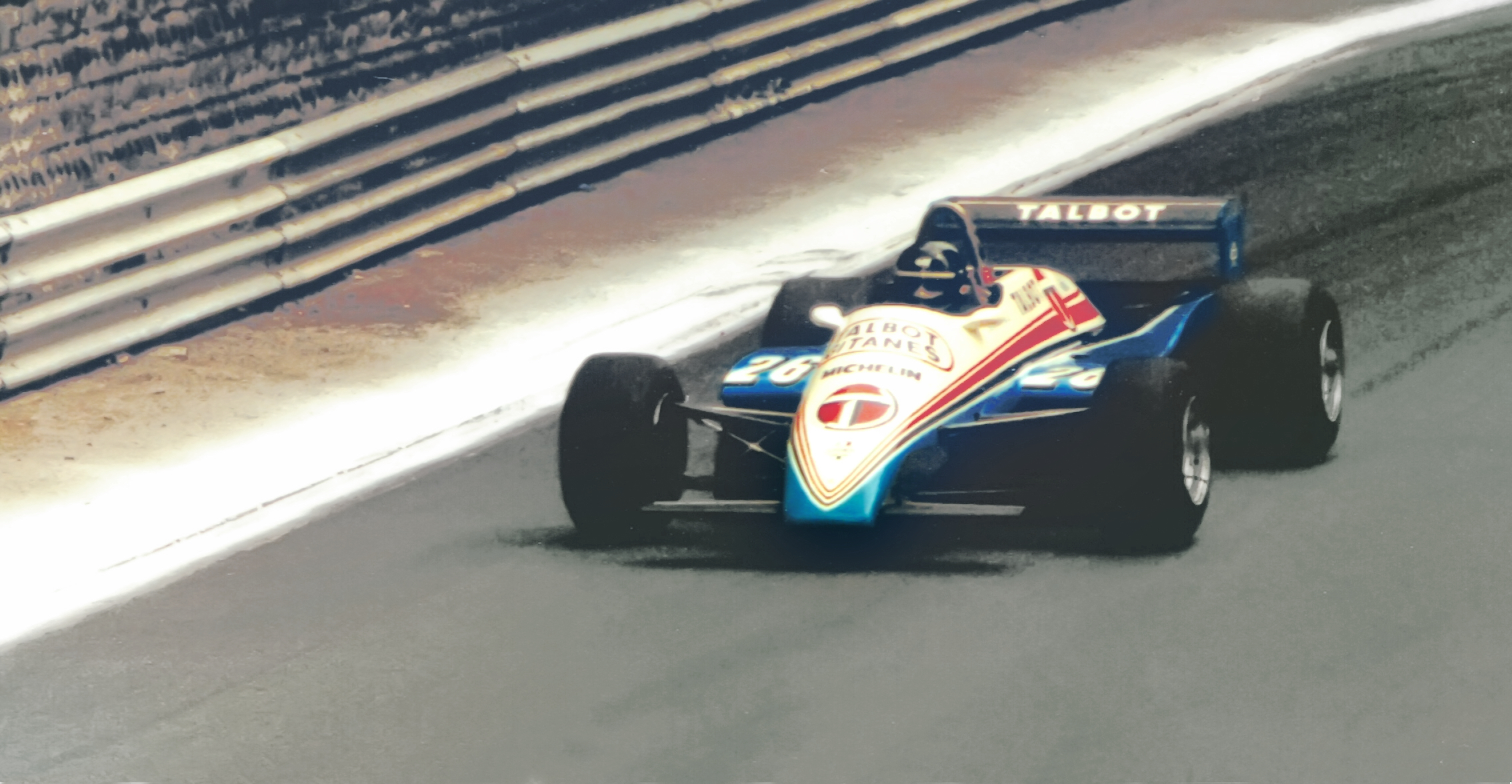
Jacques Laffite drives the JS19 at the 1982 Pau Grand Prix

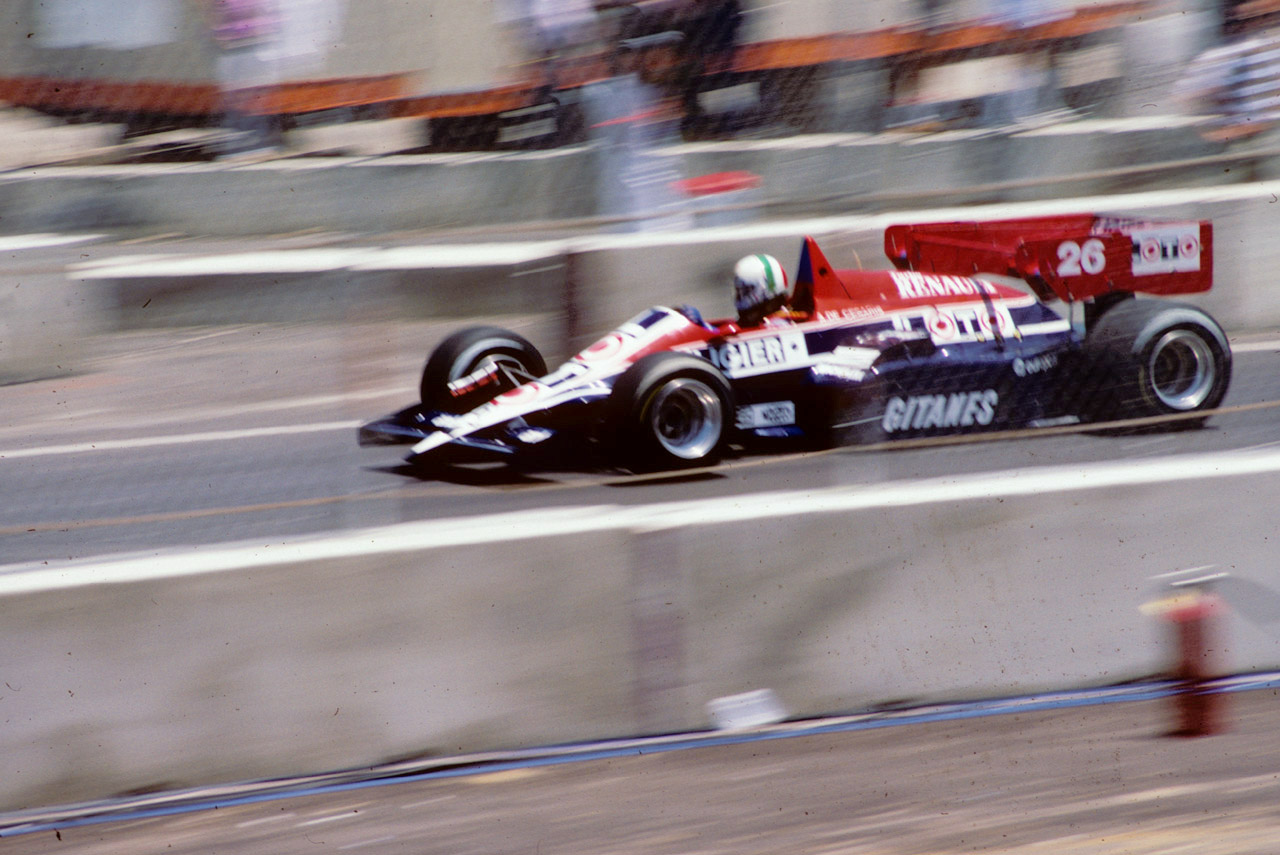
Andrea de Cesaris drives the JS23 chassis at the 1984 Dallas Grand Prix.

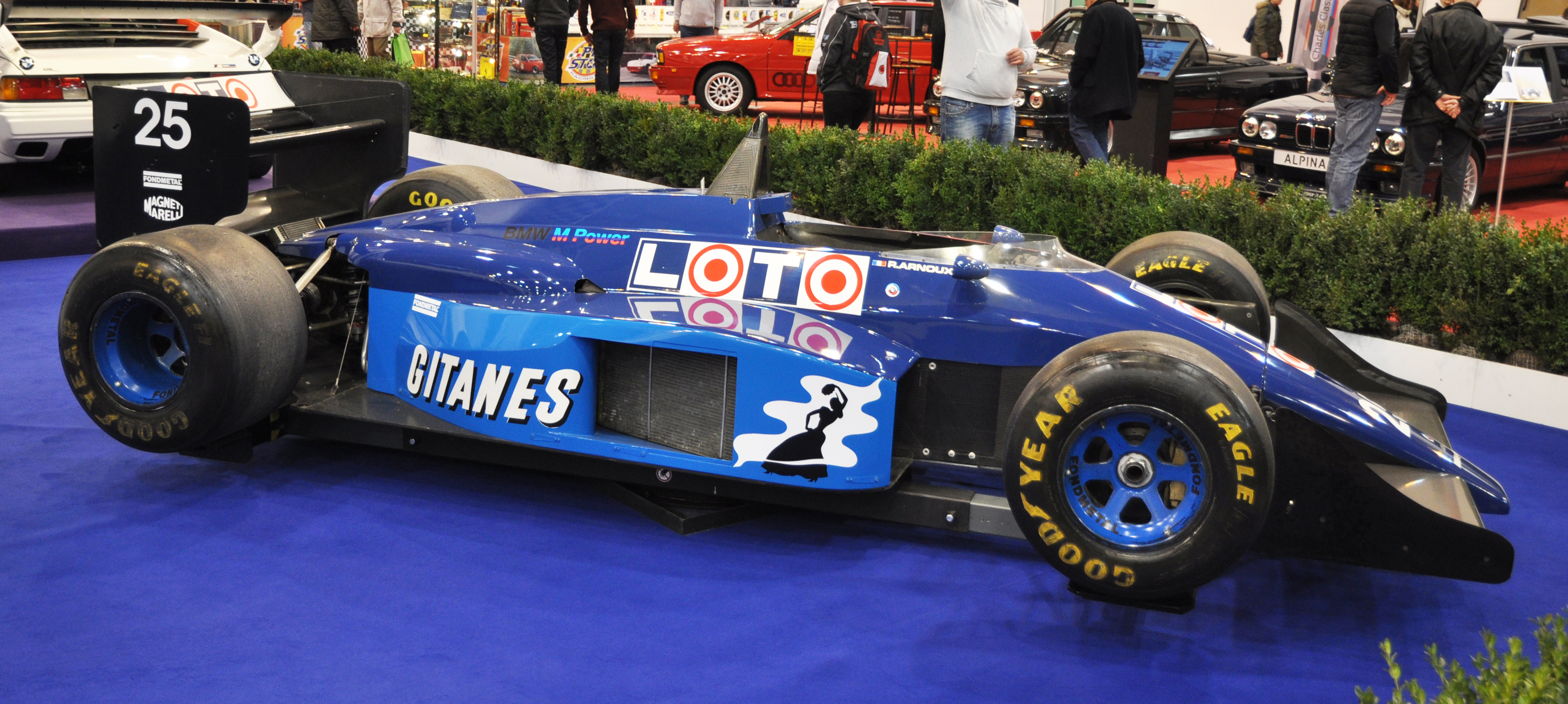
A Ligier JS29 from the 1987 season.

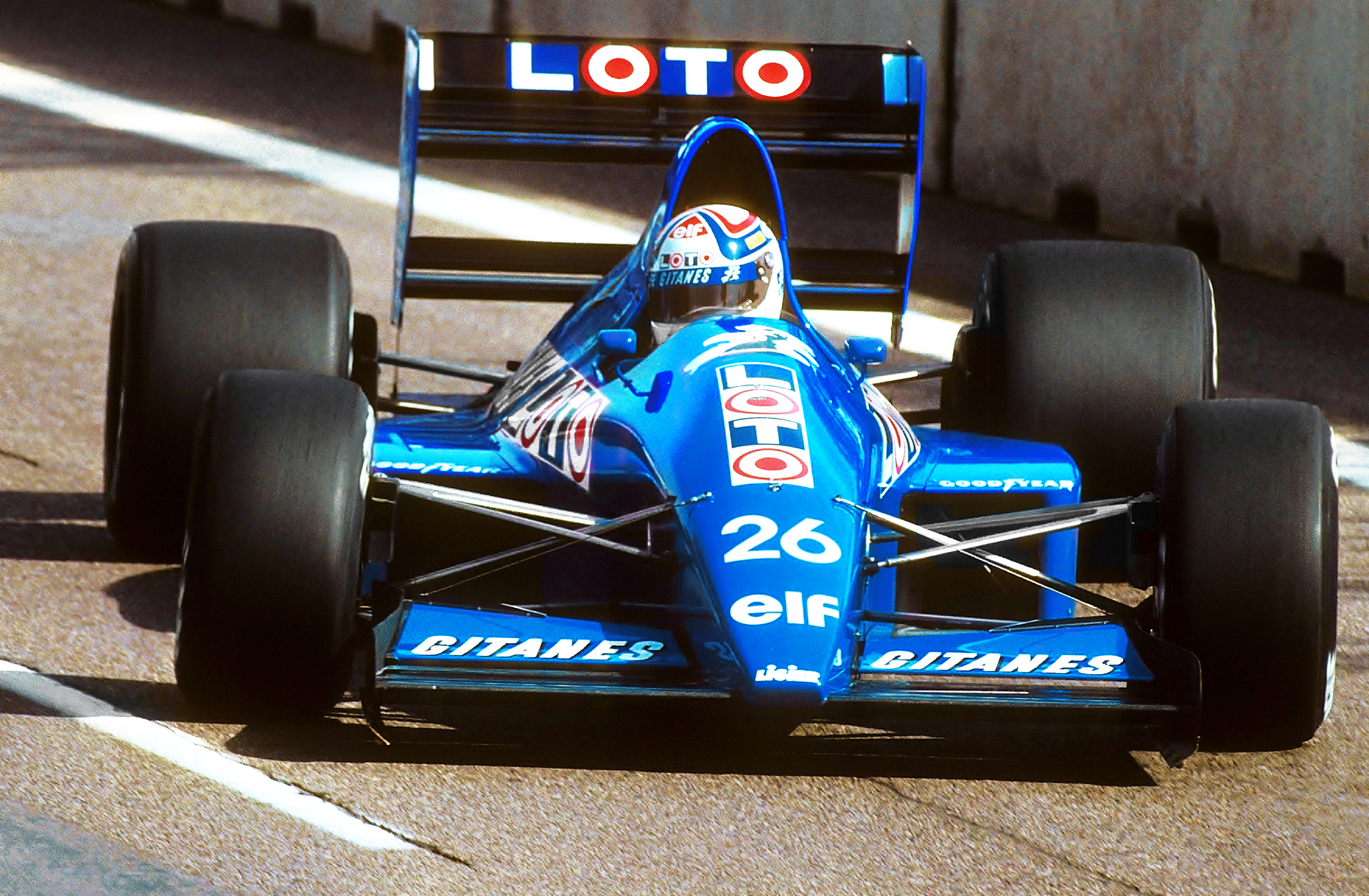
Philippe Alliot driving the Ligier JS33 at the 1990 United States Grand Prix.

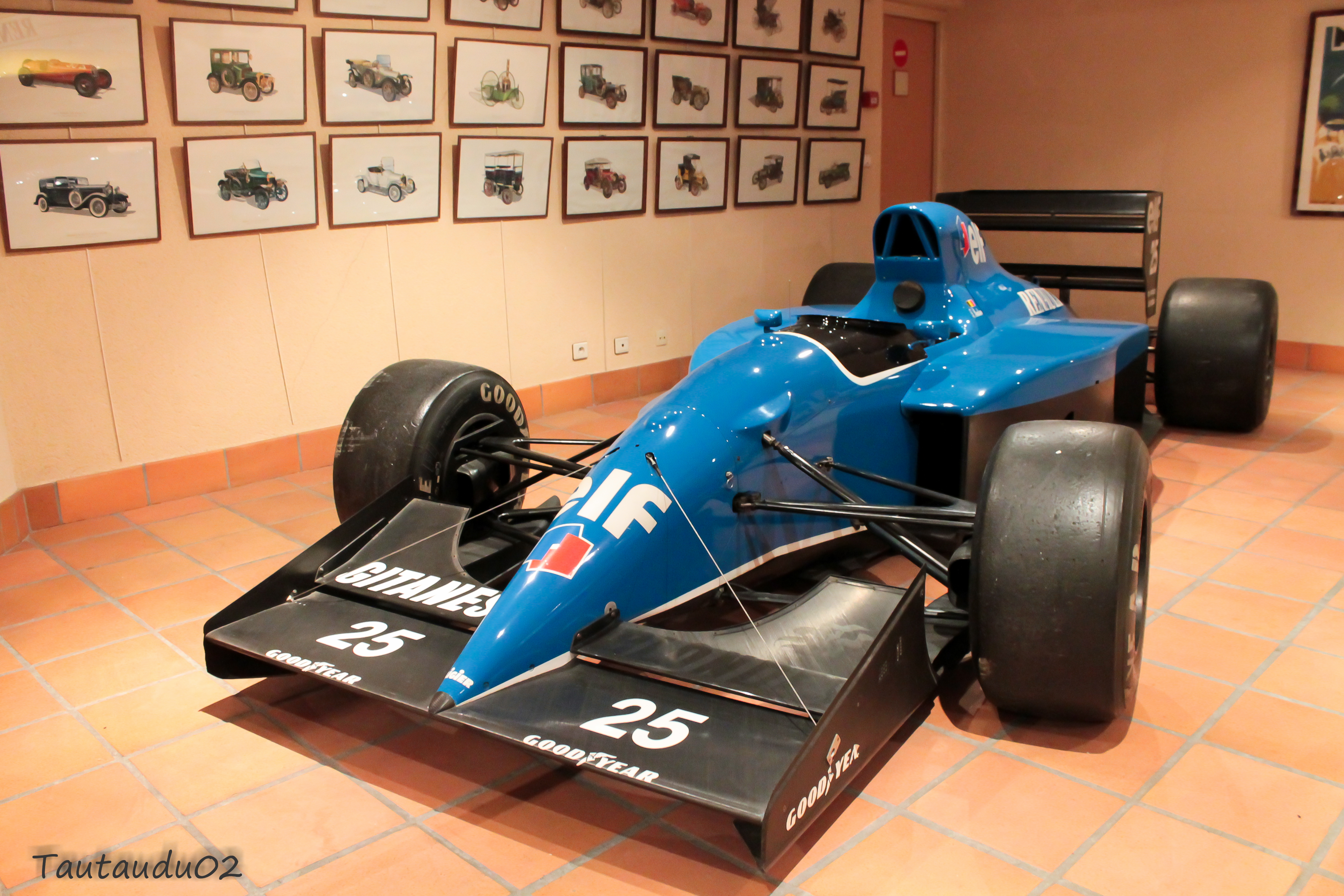
A 1991 Ligier JS35 on display at Musée Automobile de Monaco

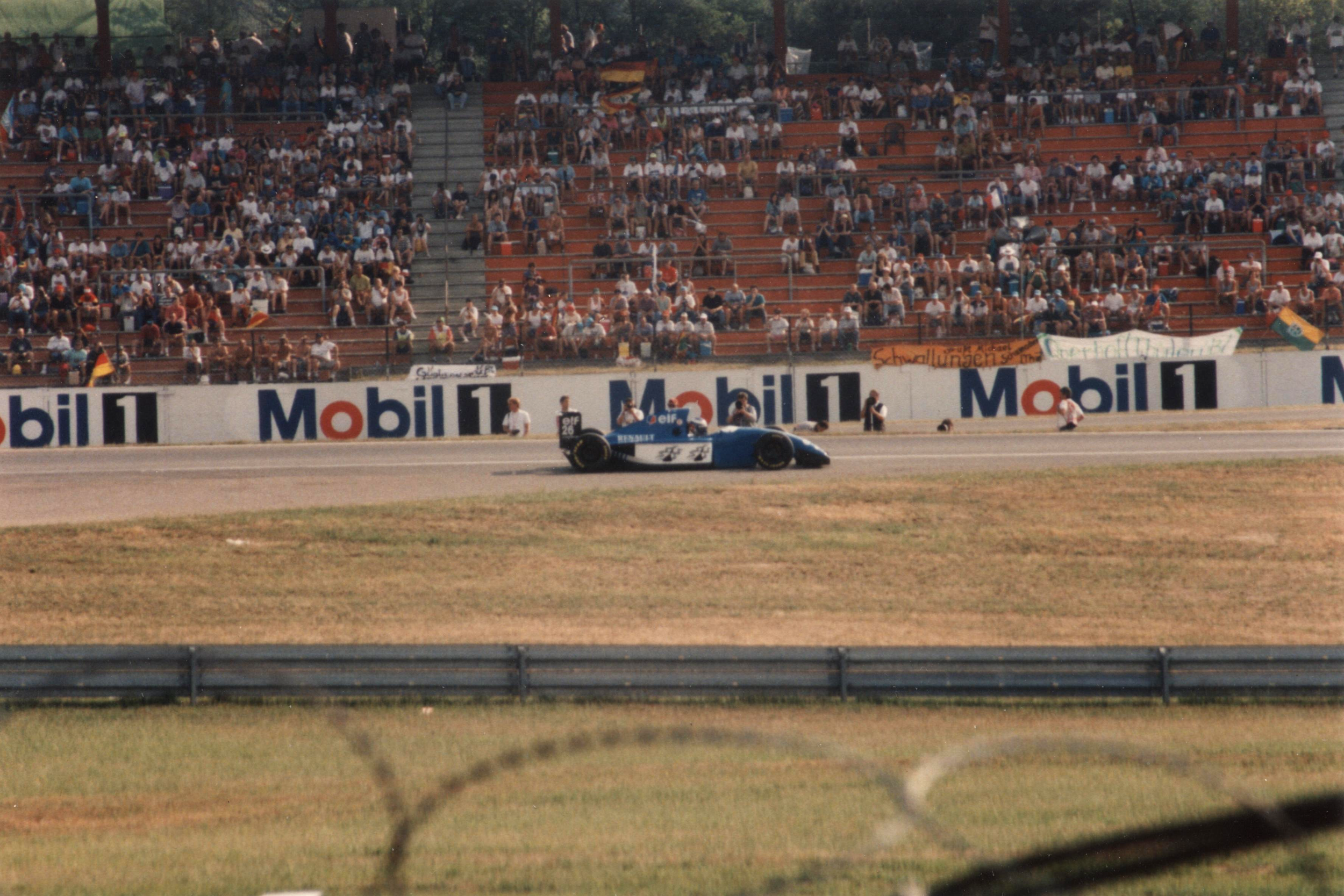
Olivier Panis driving the JS40 at the 1994 German GP.

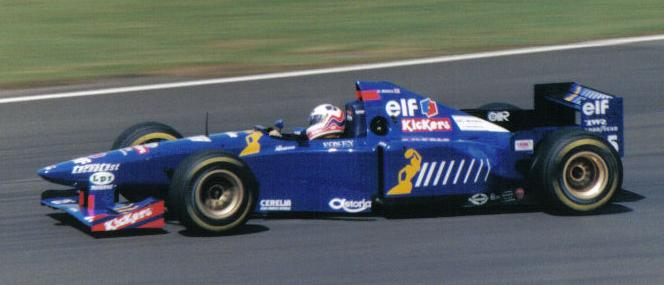
Martin Brundle Driving the JS41 in its non-tobacco livery at the 1995 British GP

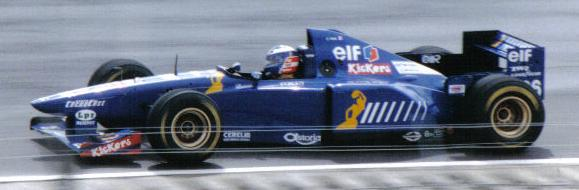
Olivier Panis Driving the JS41 in its non-tobacco livery at the 1995 British GP

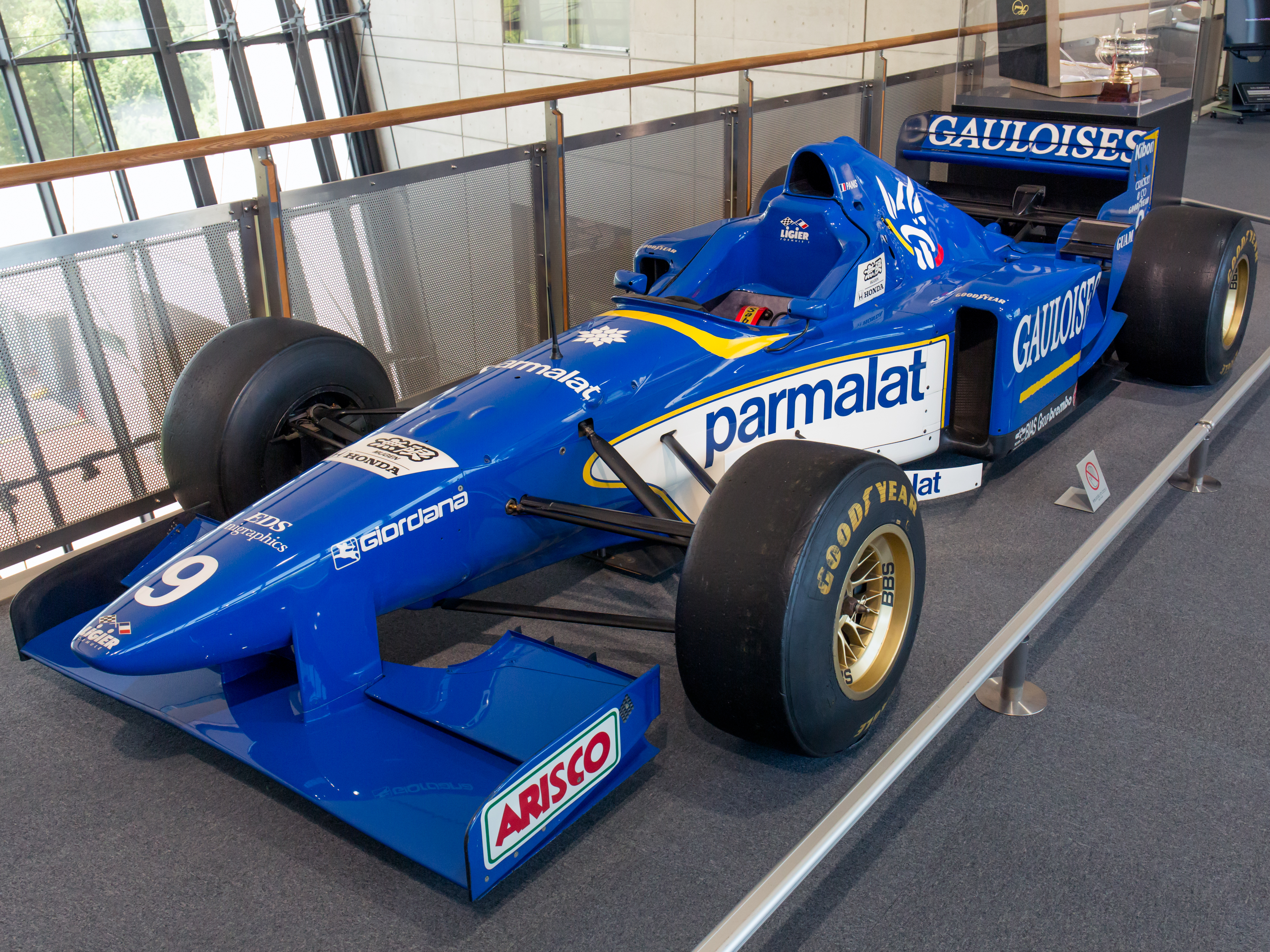
Ligier's last F1 car, the JS43, on display. Driven by Olivier Panis and Pedro Diniz, it provided Panis's only F1 victory and Ligier's last, at the 1996 Monaco Grand Prix.

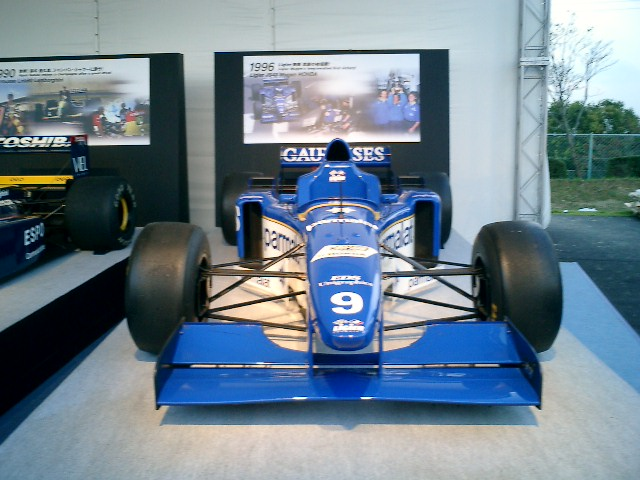
A Ligier JS43 at an exhibition in Suzuka

== Lotus (1958–1994) ==
At the 1968 Spanish Grand Prix the Lotus, initially using the British racing green, became the first works team (second only to Team Gunston entering a private Brabham car at the 1968 South African Grand Prix) to implement sponsorship brands as a livery when the possibility to do so was created in 1968. Lotus also had one of the longest sponsorship cooperations in Formula One history, making the black and gold of its John Player Special seasons (1972-1978 and 1981-1986) one of the best known liveries to this day.

Year	Main colour(s)	Additional colour(s)	Livery sponsor(s)	Additional major sponsor(s)	Non-tobacco/alcohol livery changes
1958–1962	Gray-Green	White, Black			
1962–1968	Green	White, Black, Yellow			
1968–1971	Red and White	Gold	Gold Leaf (Imperial Tobacco)		
1972–1978	Black	Gold	John Player Special (Imperial Tobacco)	Olympus (1978)	
1979	British racing green	Red, White and Blue	Martini	Tissot	
1980	Dark Blue	Red, White and Silver	Essex	Tissot	
1981–1986	Black	Gold	John Player Special (Imperial Tobacco)	Essex, Tissot, Courage (1981); Champion (1983); Pirelli (1983); Renault (1983–1986); Elf (1983–1986) Goodyear (1984–1986) Olympus (1985); DeLonghi (1986)	"John Player Special" and the "JPS" was replaced with Laurels designs
1987	Yellow	Blue	Camel	DeLonghi, Elf, Goodyear, Honda, Brembo, Micromax, Philips, Applicon	"Camel" was replaced with "Lotus"
1988	Yellow	Blue, Green	Camel	Epson, Goodyear, Honda, Courtaulds, Elf, OZ Wheels, Momo, Blistein	"Camel" was replaced with "Courtaulds"
1989	Yellow	Dark Blue	Camel	Epson, Goodyear, Courtaulds, Elf, OZ Wheels, Momo, Blistein, NGK, PIAA Corporation, Raychem	"Camel" was replaced by the Camel logo
1990	Yellow	Blue, Light Green	Camel	Epson, Goodyear, Courtaulds, Elf, OZ Wheels, Momo, Blistein, NGK, Phenix, BP, Raychem, Chrysler, Lamborghini	"Camel" was replaced by the Camel logo
1991–1992	Green	White (1991); Yellow (1992)	BP	Hitachi, Tamiya, Tommy Hilfiger, Komatsu, Nichibutsu, Shionogi, Castrol, Yellow Hat, Dirt Devil, Frazer-Nash, Secol, Neste, NGK, Eurojersey, GWS, Eibach, Sematic, Momo, Raychem, Lobo, David Charles, Iltalehti, Sukhoi	
1993–1994	Green, White and Red	Black and Yellow	Castrol	Hitachi, Tamiya, Tommy Hilfiger, Miller, Loctite, Shionogi, Mobil 1, Pepe Jeans, Komatsu, Nichibutsu, SG Gigante (on Pedro Lamy's Car, as it was his sponsor)	

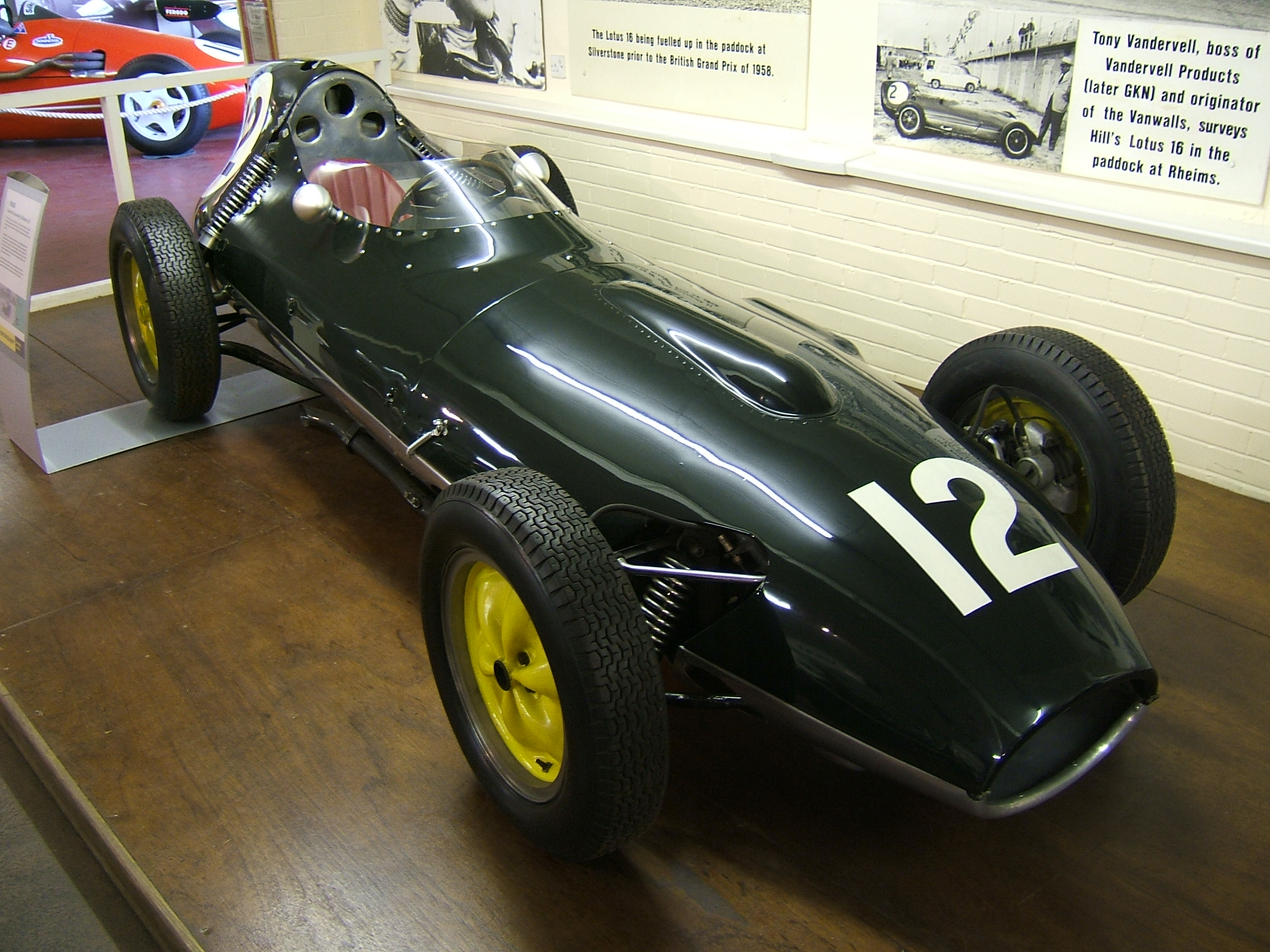
Prior to commercial sponsorship, Lotus cars ran in a livery of British racing green. This is the Lotus 16, which raced from 1958-1960.

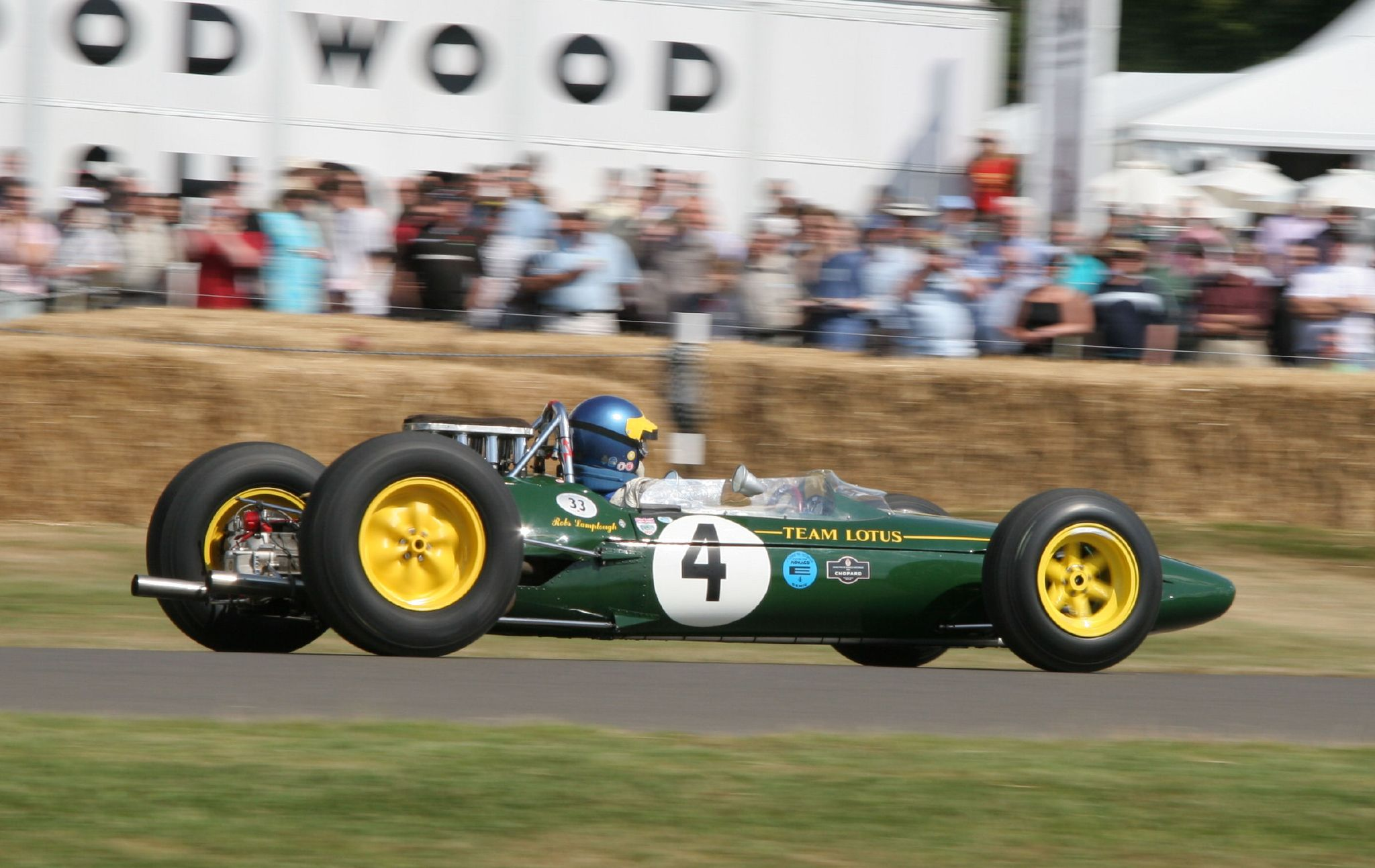
The Lotus 33 being demonstrated at the 2006 Goodwood Festival of Speed.

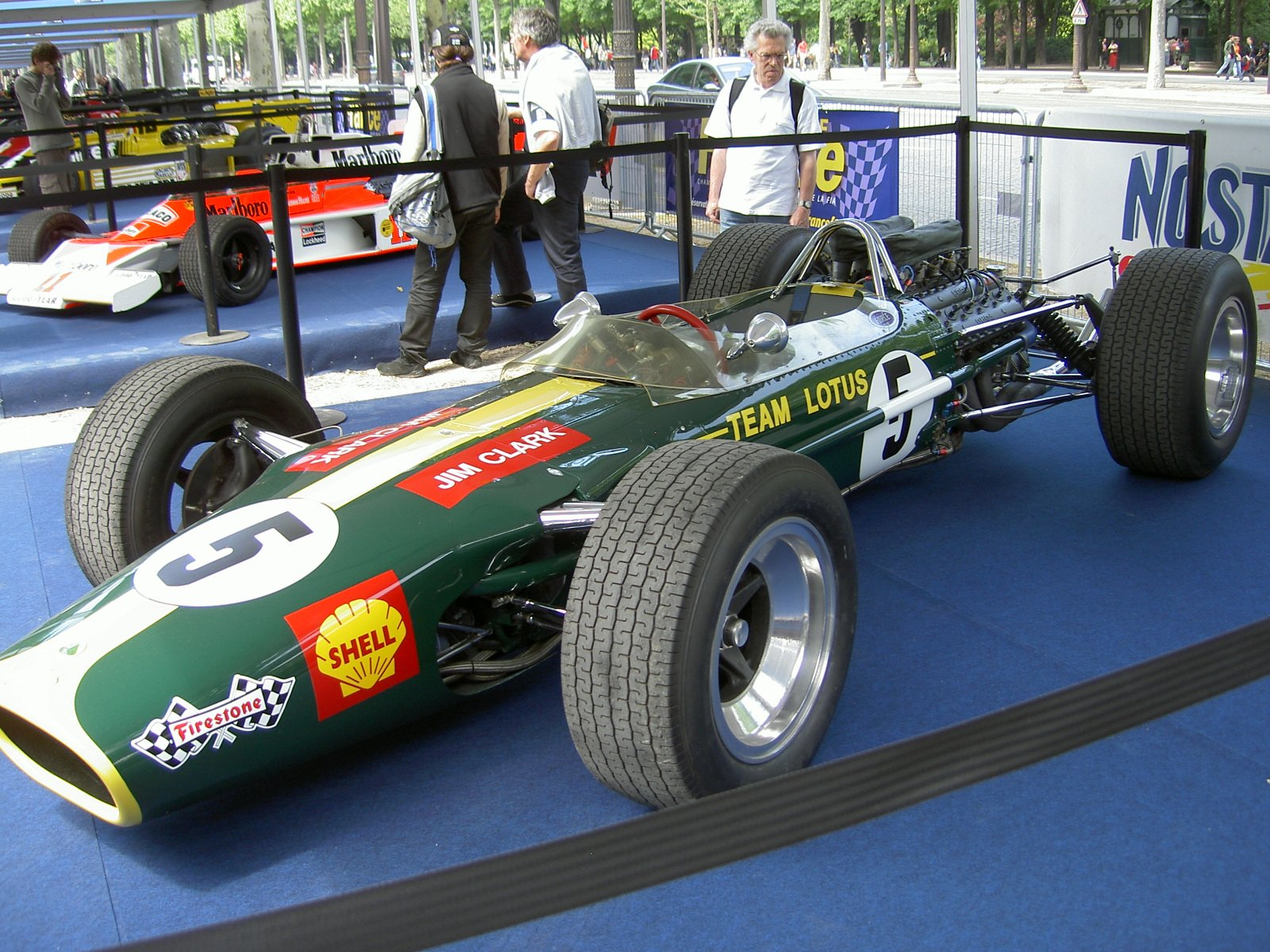
This is a Jim CLark's Lotus 49 with some sponsors, prior to Gold Leaf Sponsorship in 1967

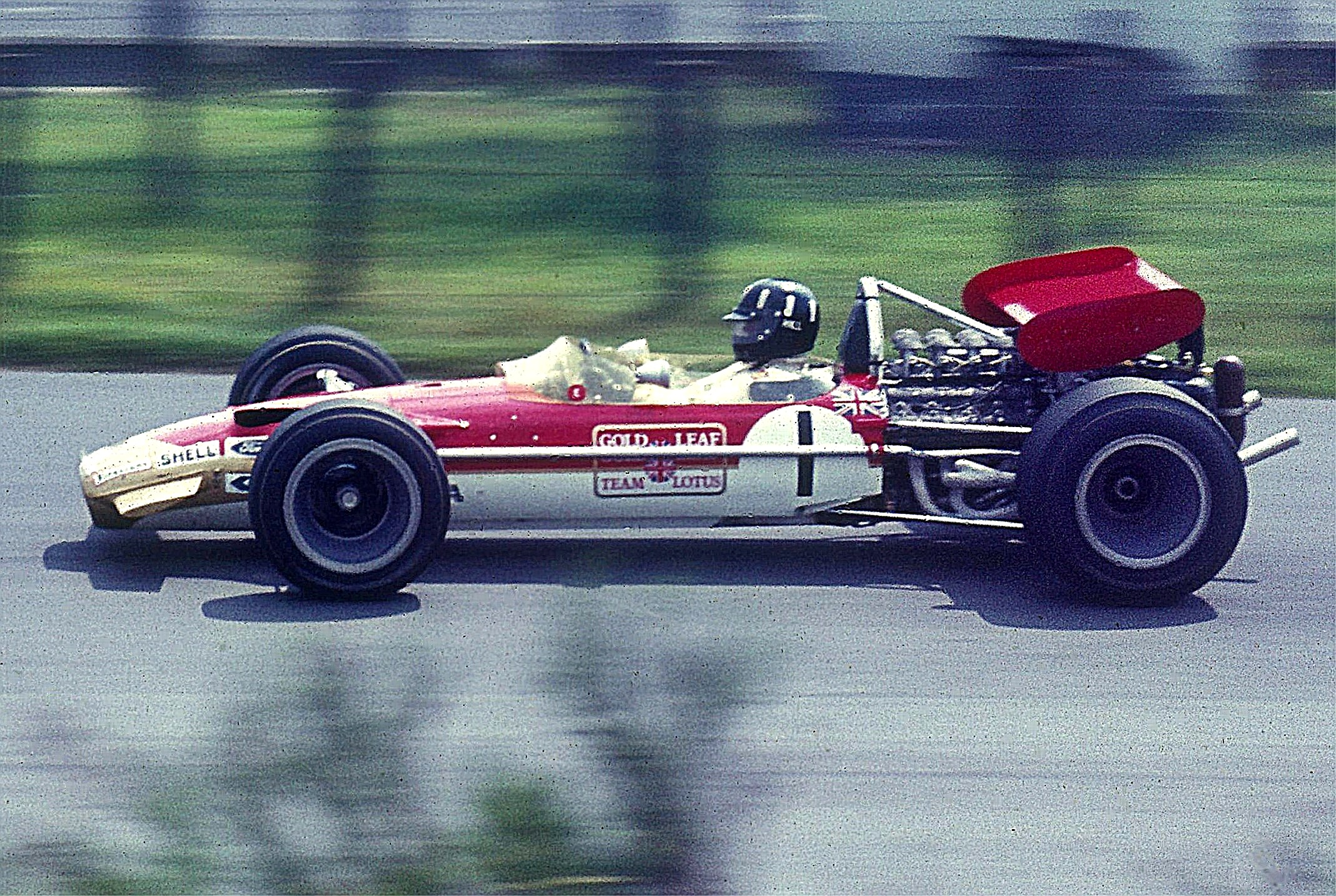
Lotus pioneered sponsorship in F1 through its deal with Imperial Tobacco, which resulted in the cars racing with a "Gold Leaf" livery. This is Graham Hill driving a Lotus 49B at the 1969 German Grand Prix.

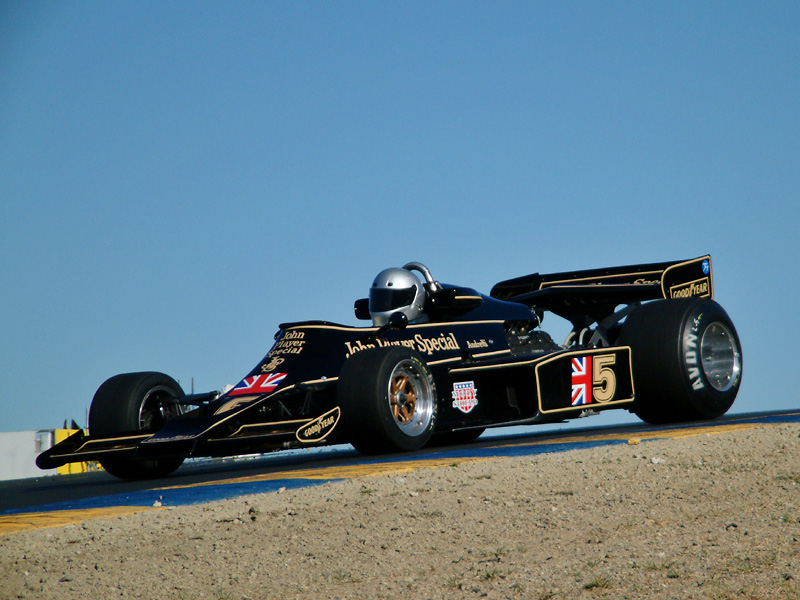
A Lotus 77 in the famous John Player Special colours.

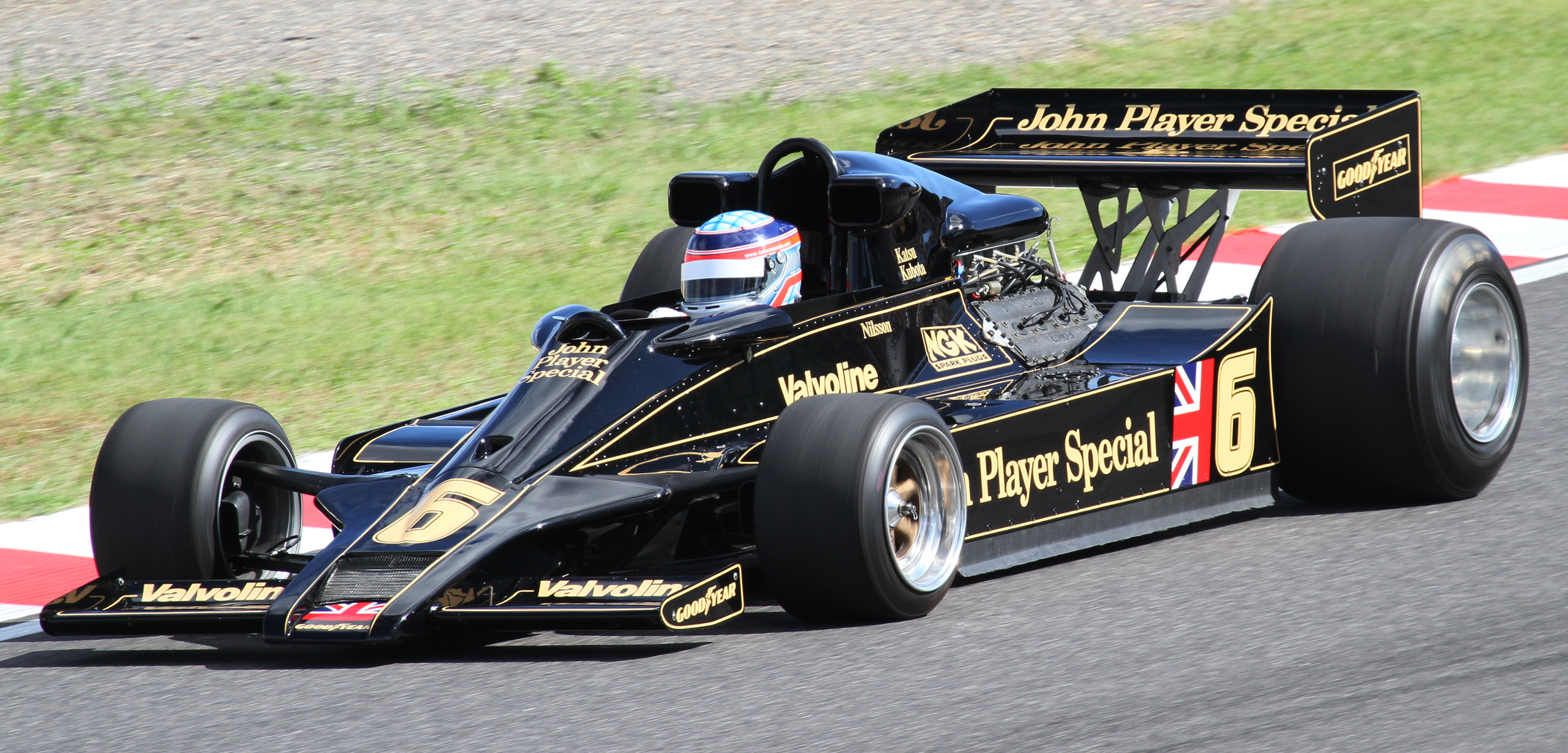
Takuma Sato Driving a Lotus 78 with its John Player Special Livery

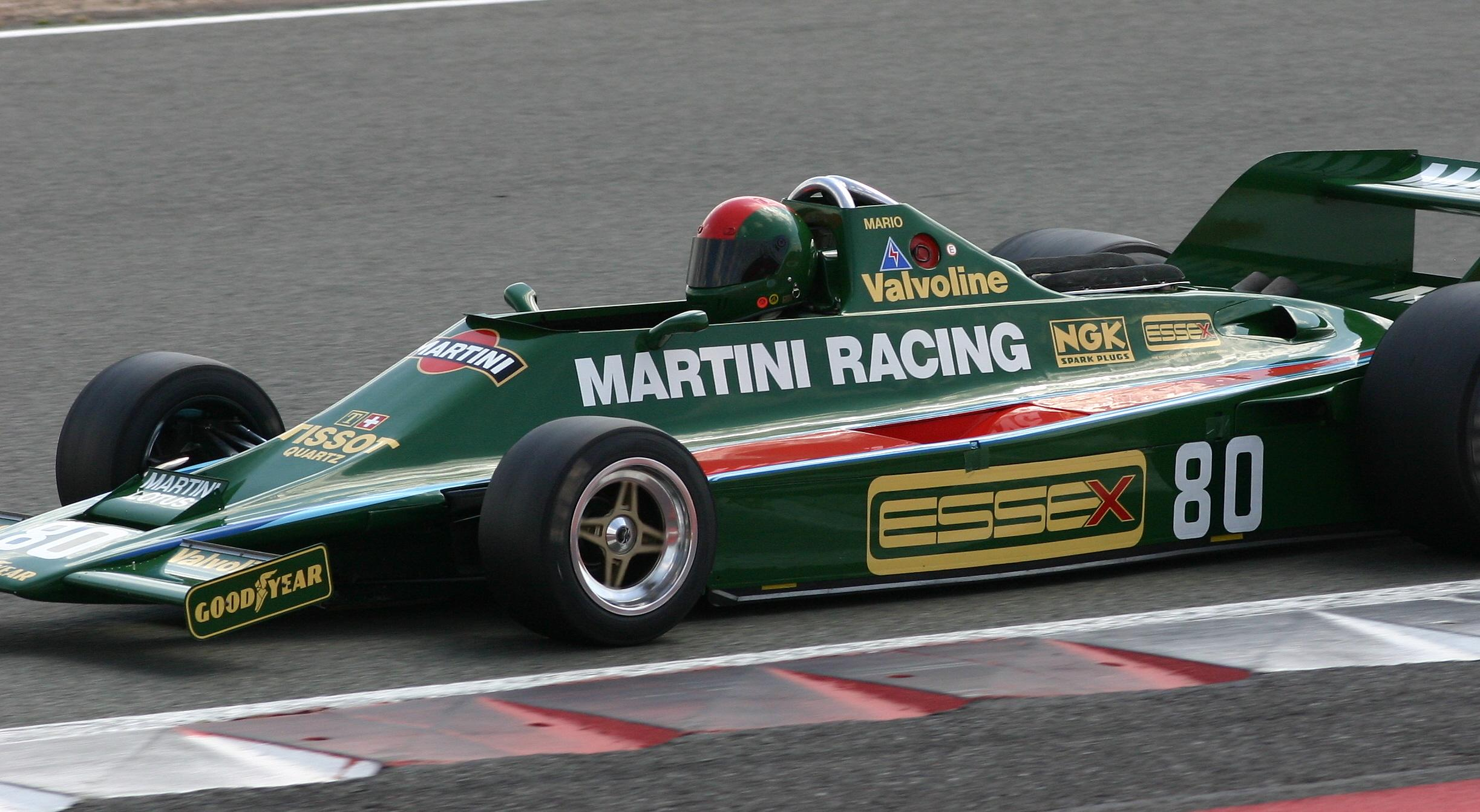
The Lotus 80 being driven at the 2008 Silverstone Classic race meeting.

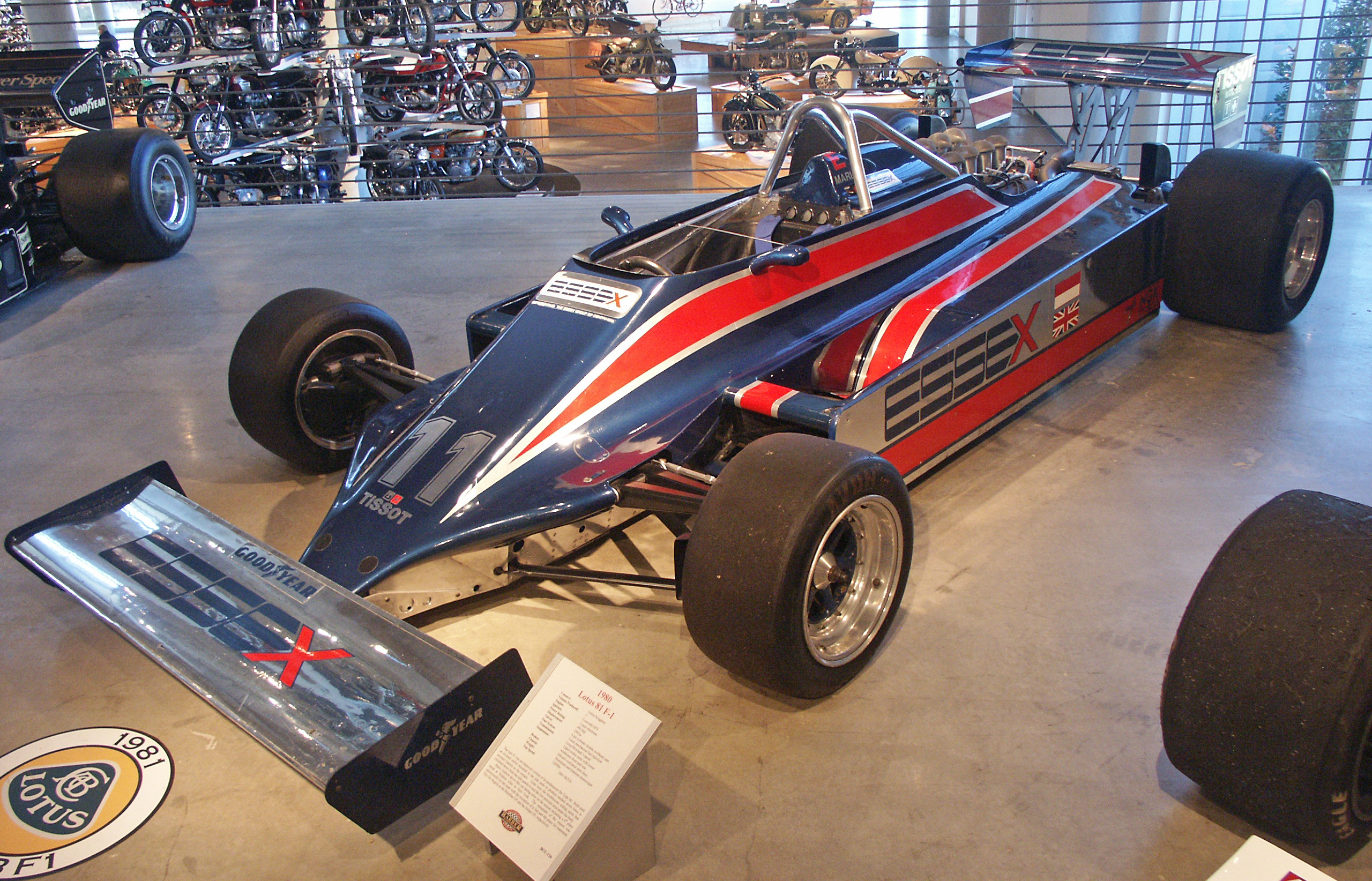
Mario Andretti's 1981 Lotus 81

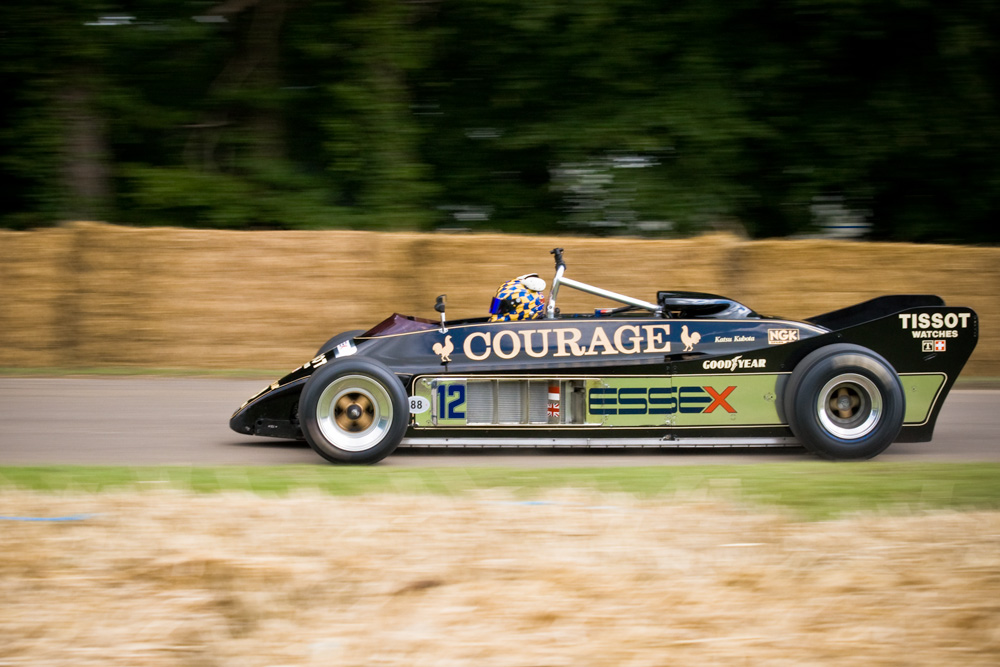
Lotus briefly parted ways with JPS in the early 1980s, as is evidenced by this Lotus 88 originally from 1981.

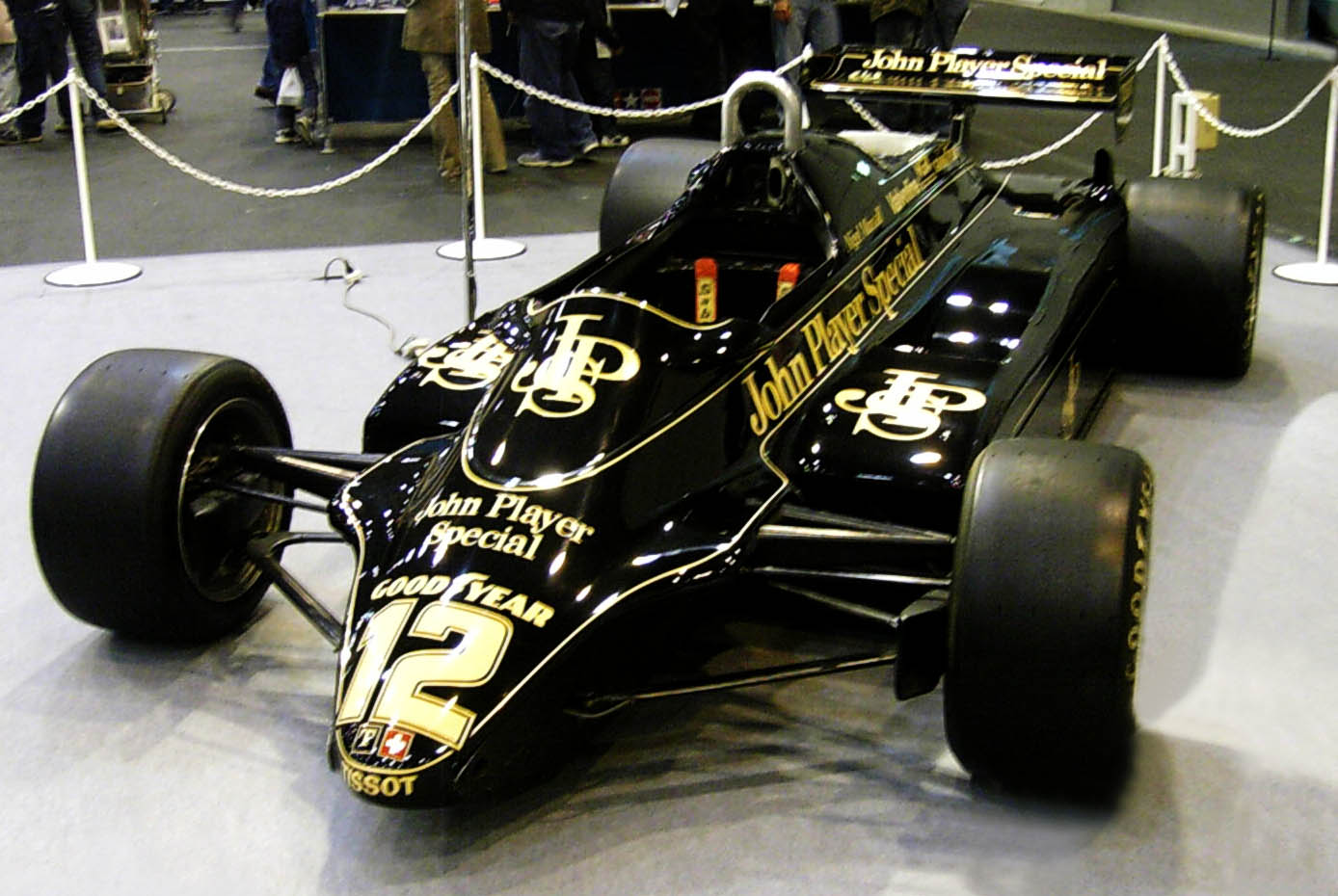
The Lotus 91 Formula One car being exhibited in Japan. A Nigel Mansell's car.

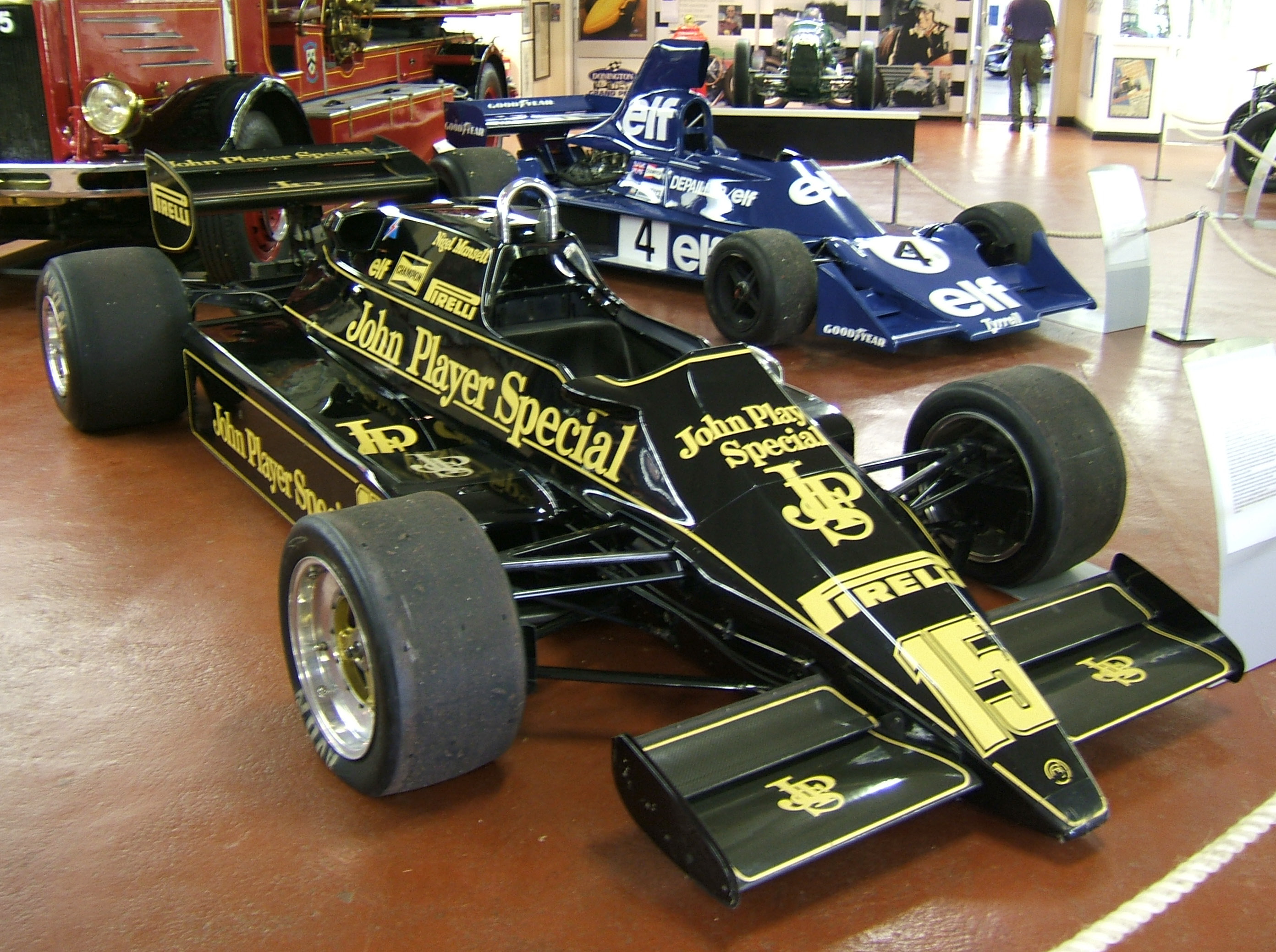
A Lotus 92 in display

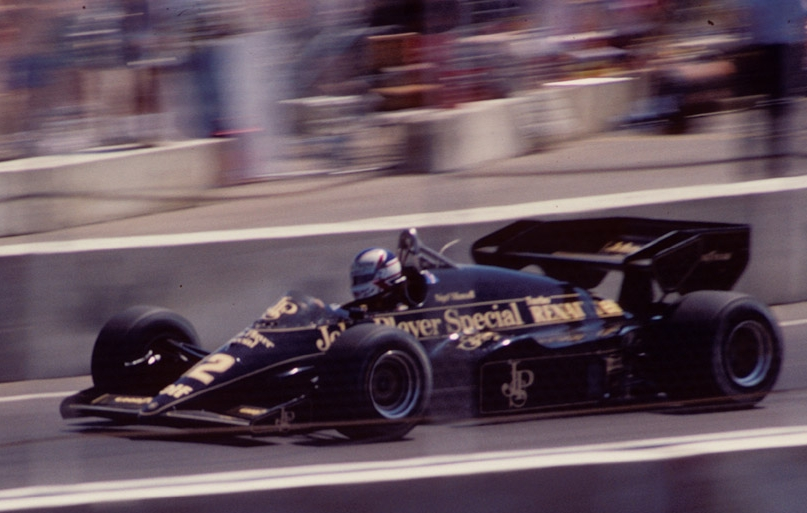
Nigel Mansell driving his Lotus 95T at the 1984 Dallas Grand Prix

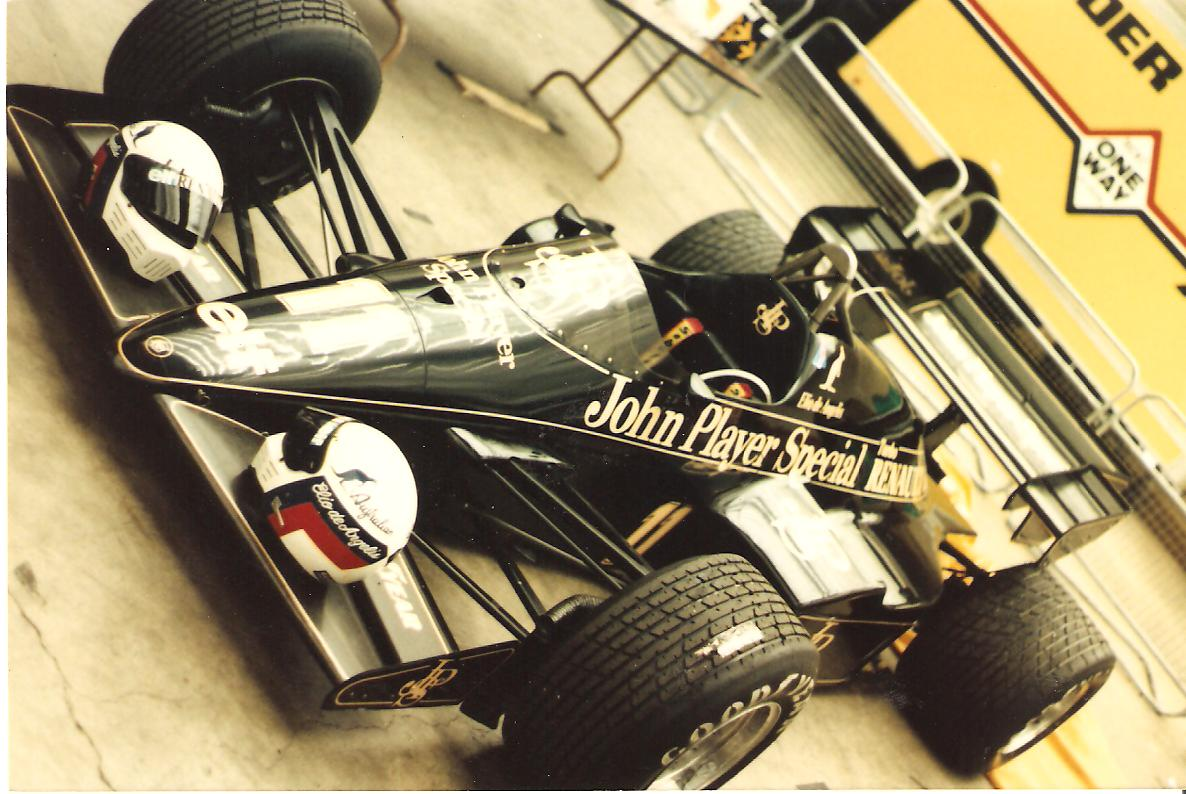
Lotus 95T in the garages of the 1984 Detroit Grand Prix

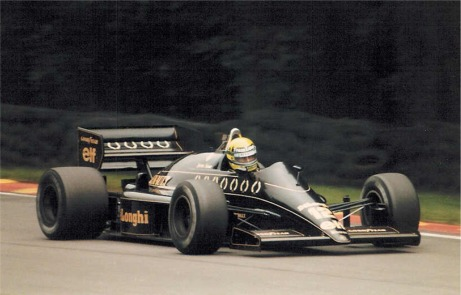
However, the partnership was soon renewed, although the JPS logo had to be replaced with a non-tobacco livery on Ayrton Senna's Lotus 98T at the 1986 British Grand Prix.

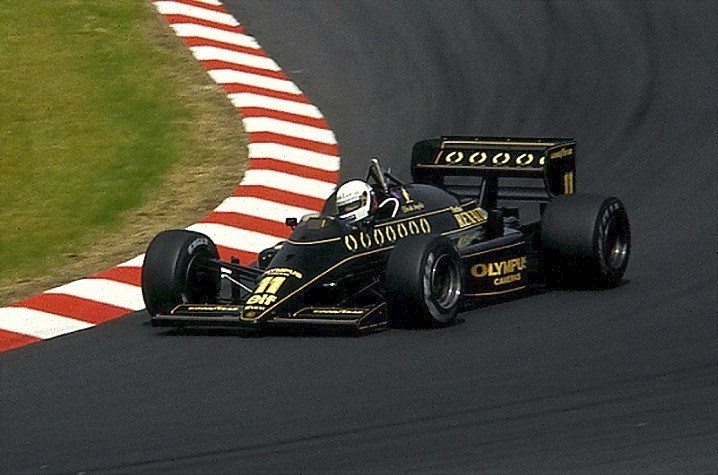
Elio de Angelis driving a Lotus97T at the 1985 German GP

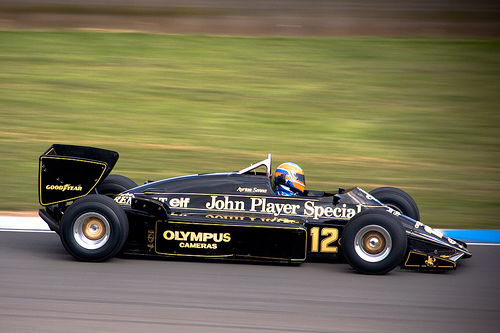
1985 Ayrton Senna Lotus 97T at the Renault World Series

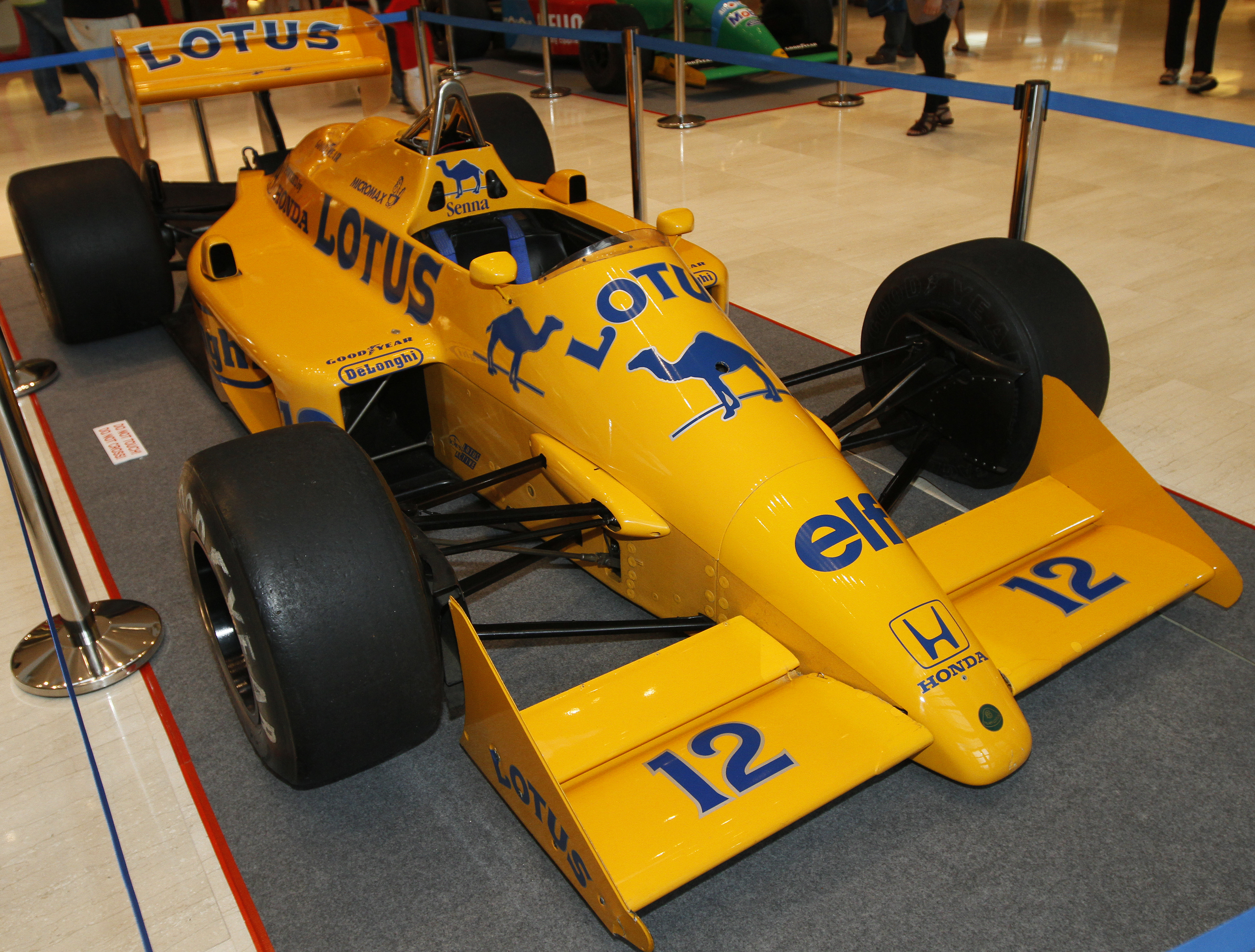
Ayrton Senna's Lotus 99T from 1987 Season

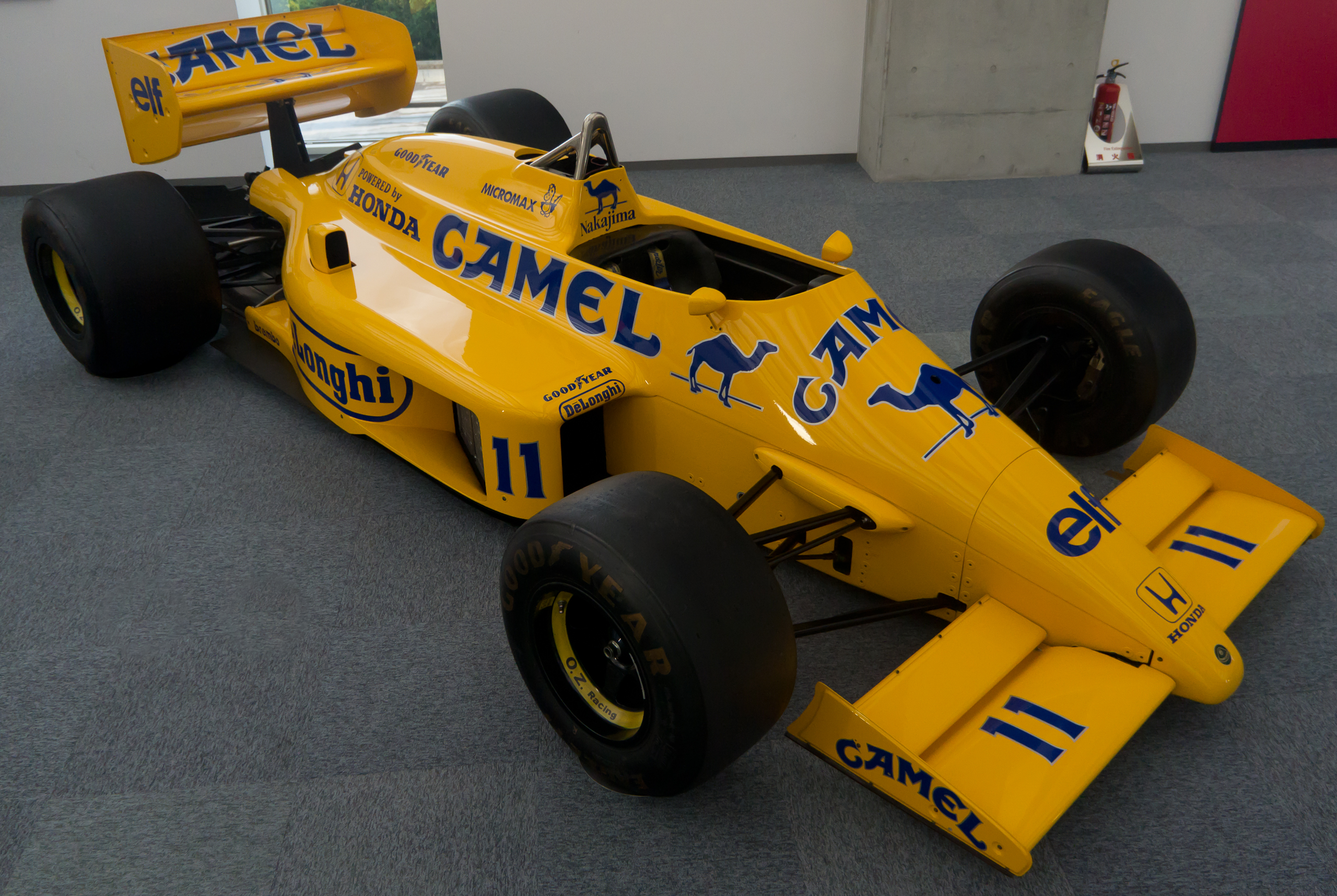
Satoru Nakajima's Lotus 99T from 1987 Season

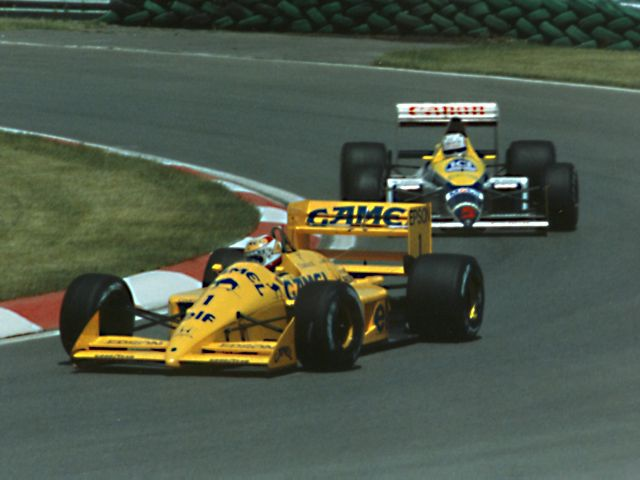
Nelson Piquet driving for Lotus at the 1988 Canada Grand Prix

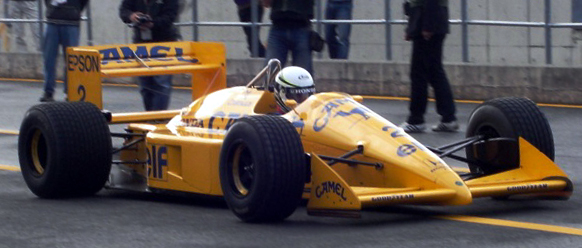
Lotus were sponsored by Camel in the period 1987–1990.

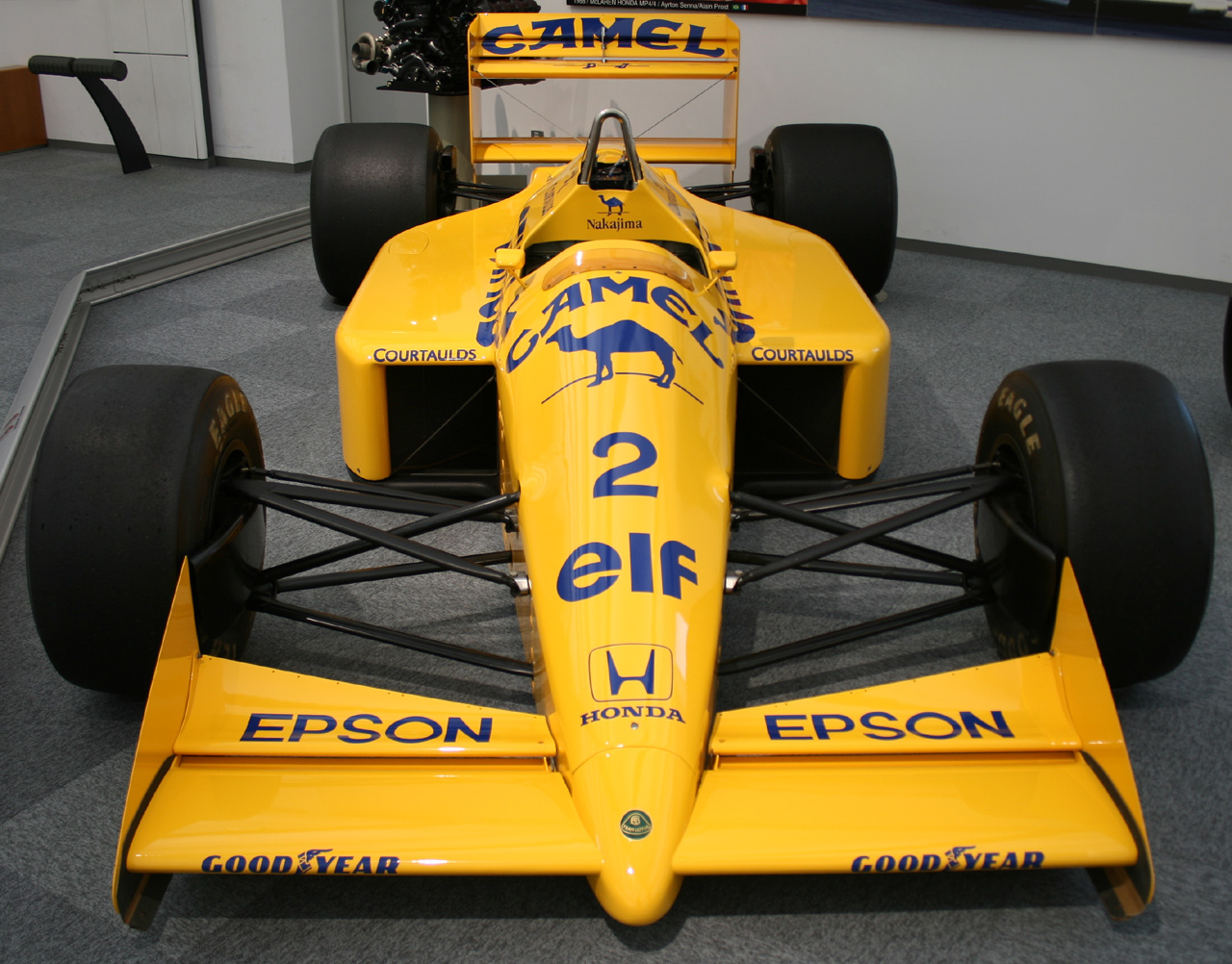
A Lotus 100T on display at the Honda Collection Hall in Japan.

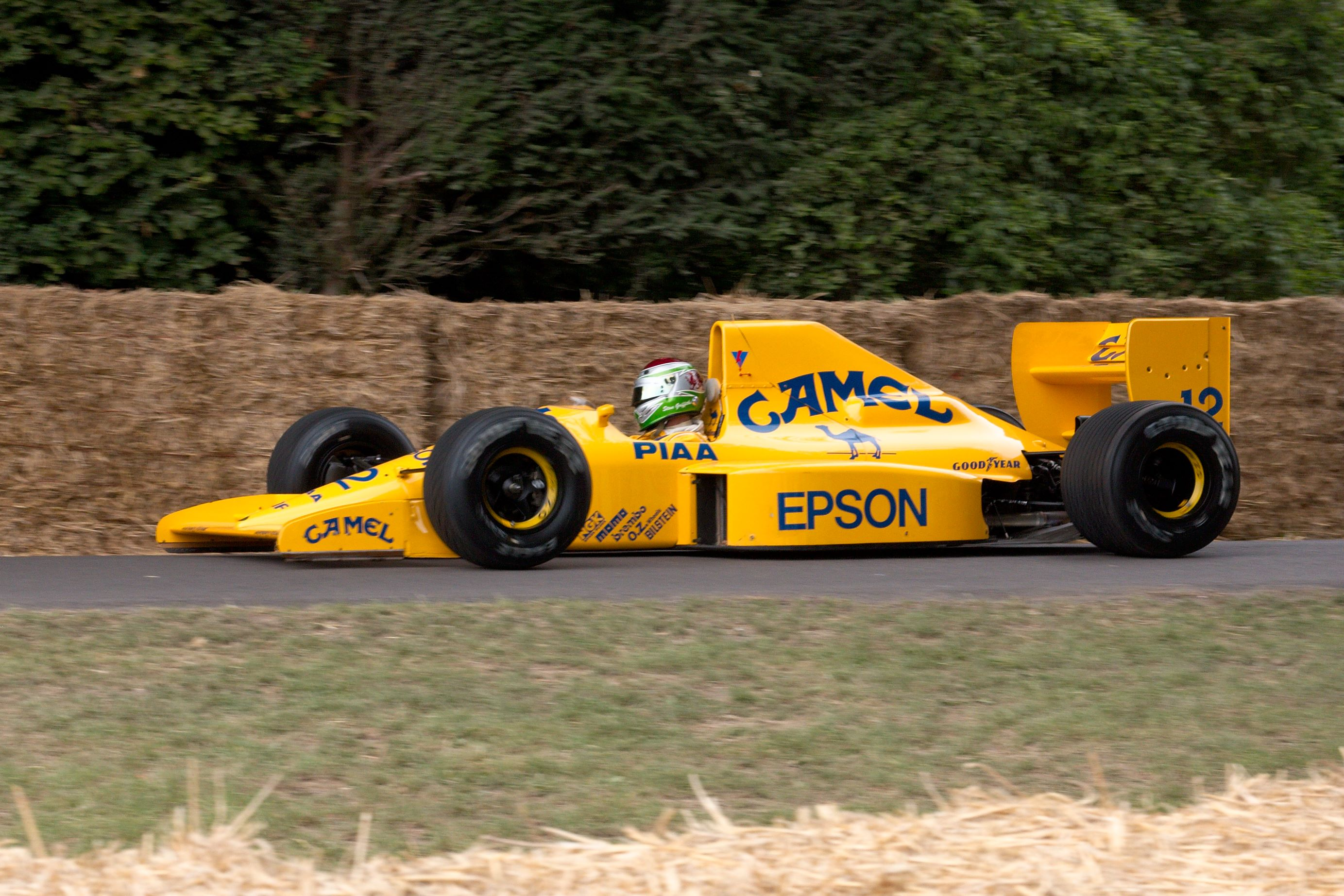
This is a Lotus Judd 101 from 1989 season

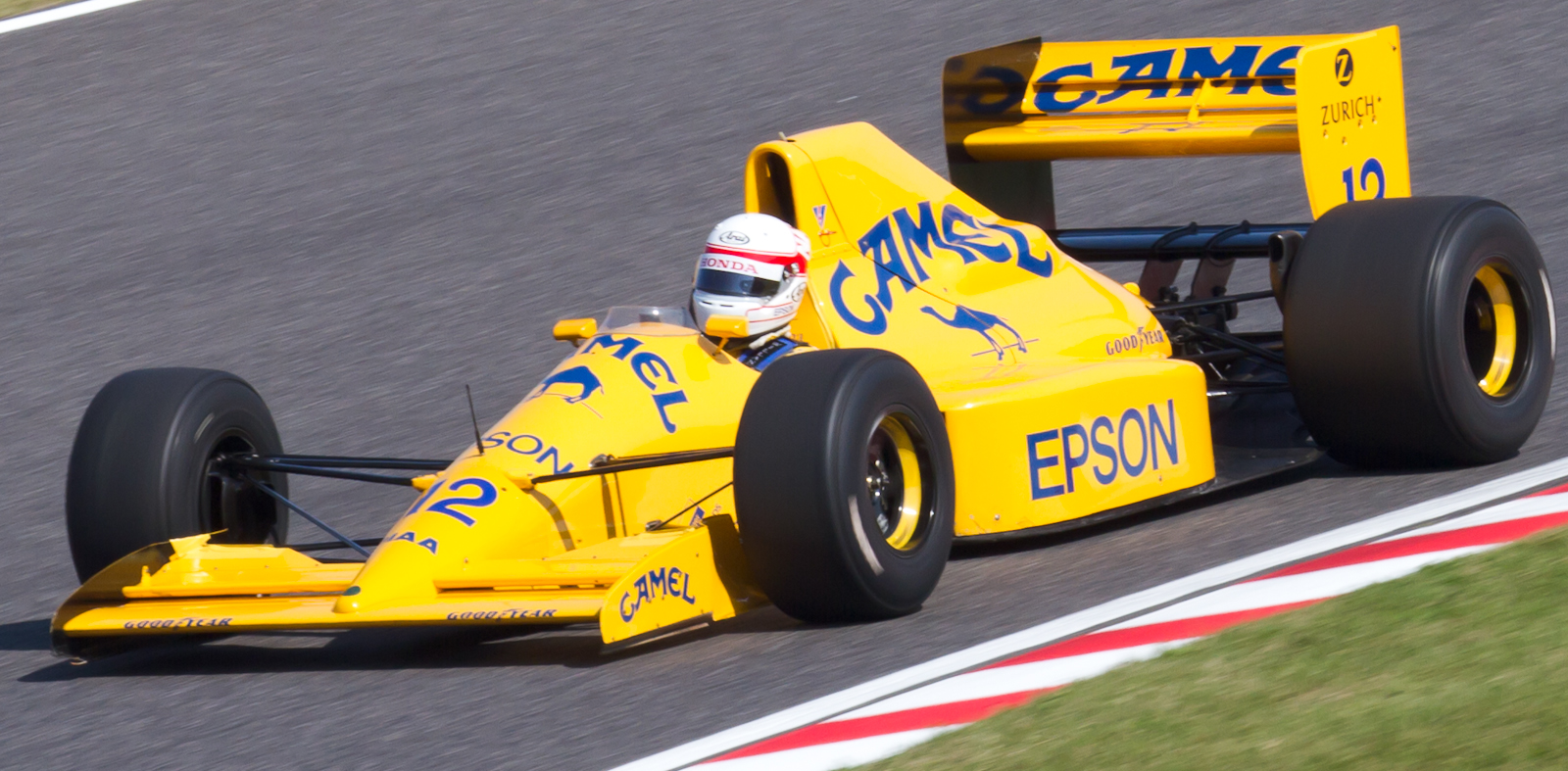
Satoru Nakajima demonstrating his Lotus 101.

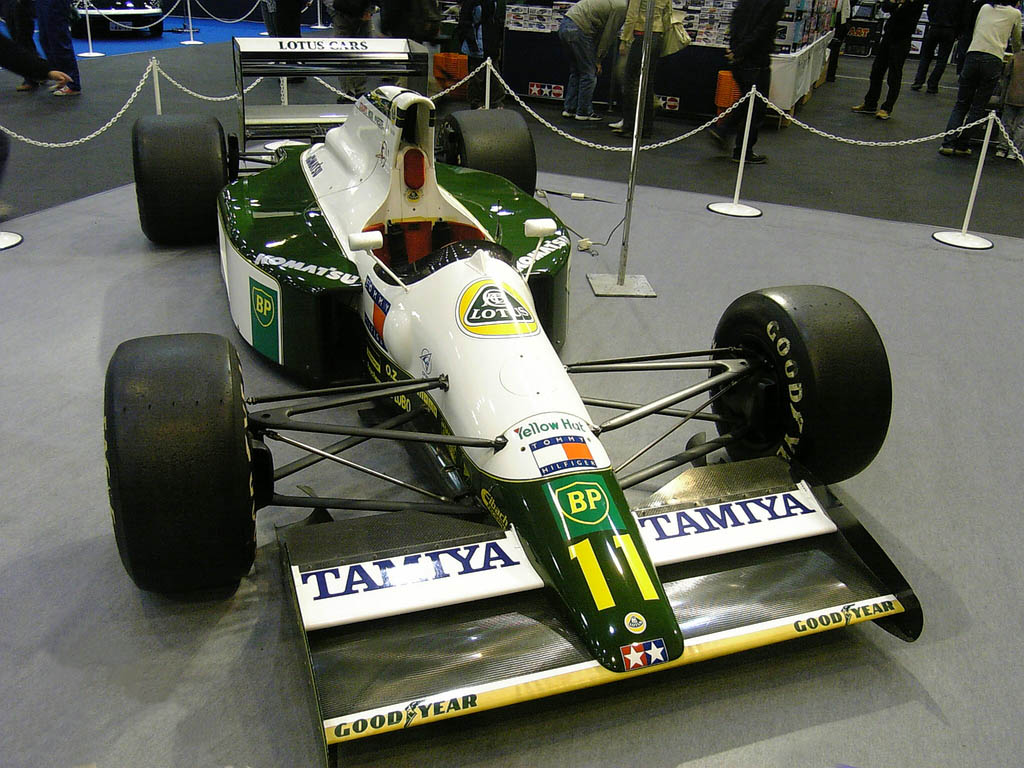
After Camel withdrew support from Lotus, Lotus had to rely on some Japanese sponsors such as Tamiya, Yellow Hat and Komatsu

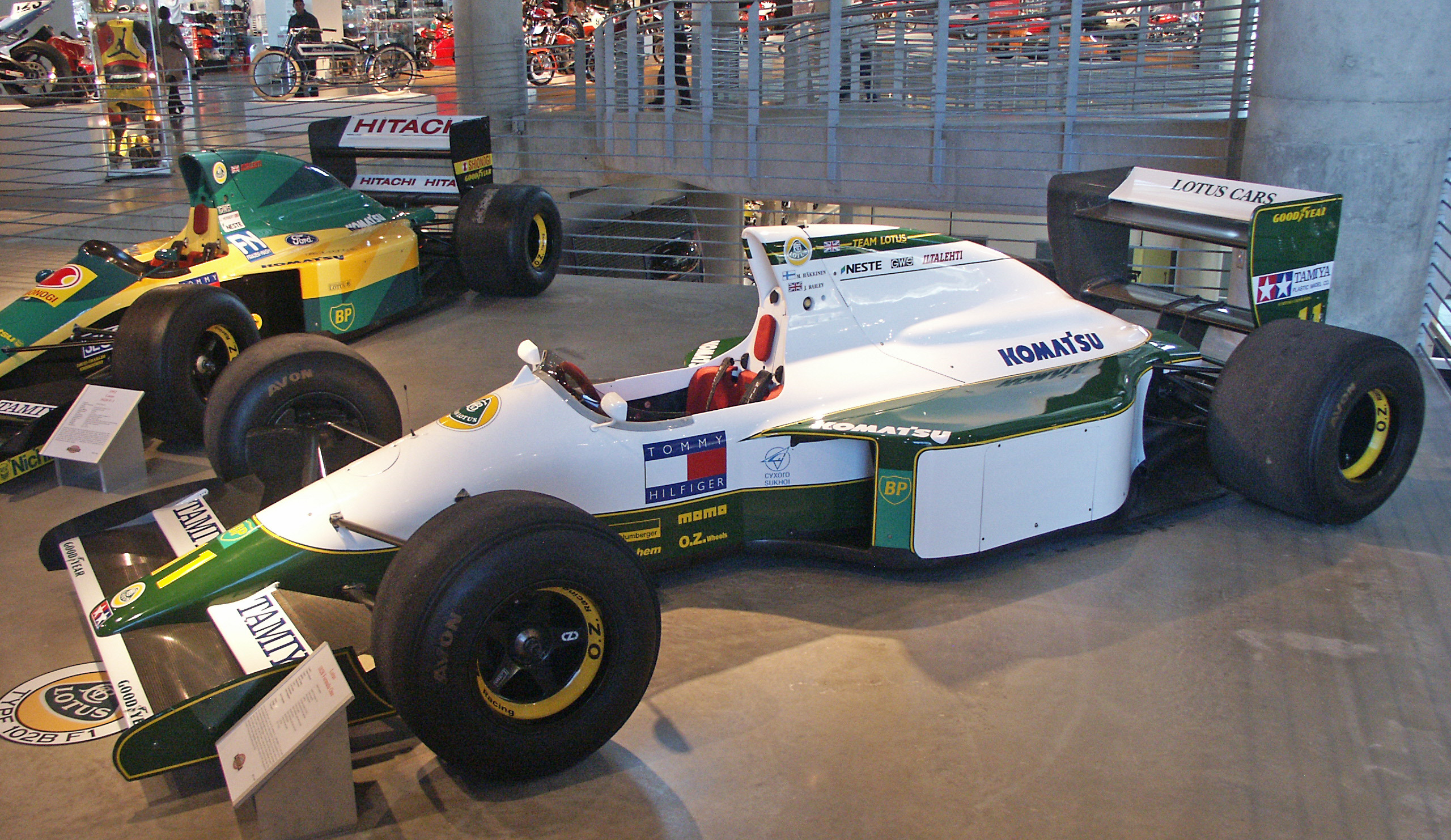
A Lotus 102B from 1991 in display

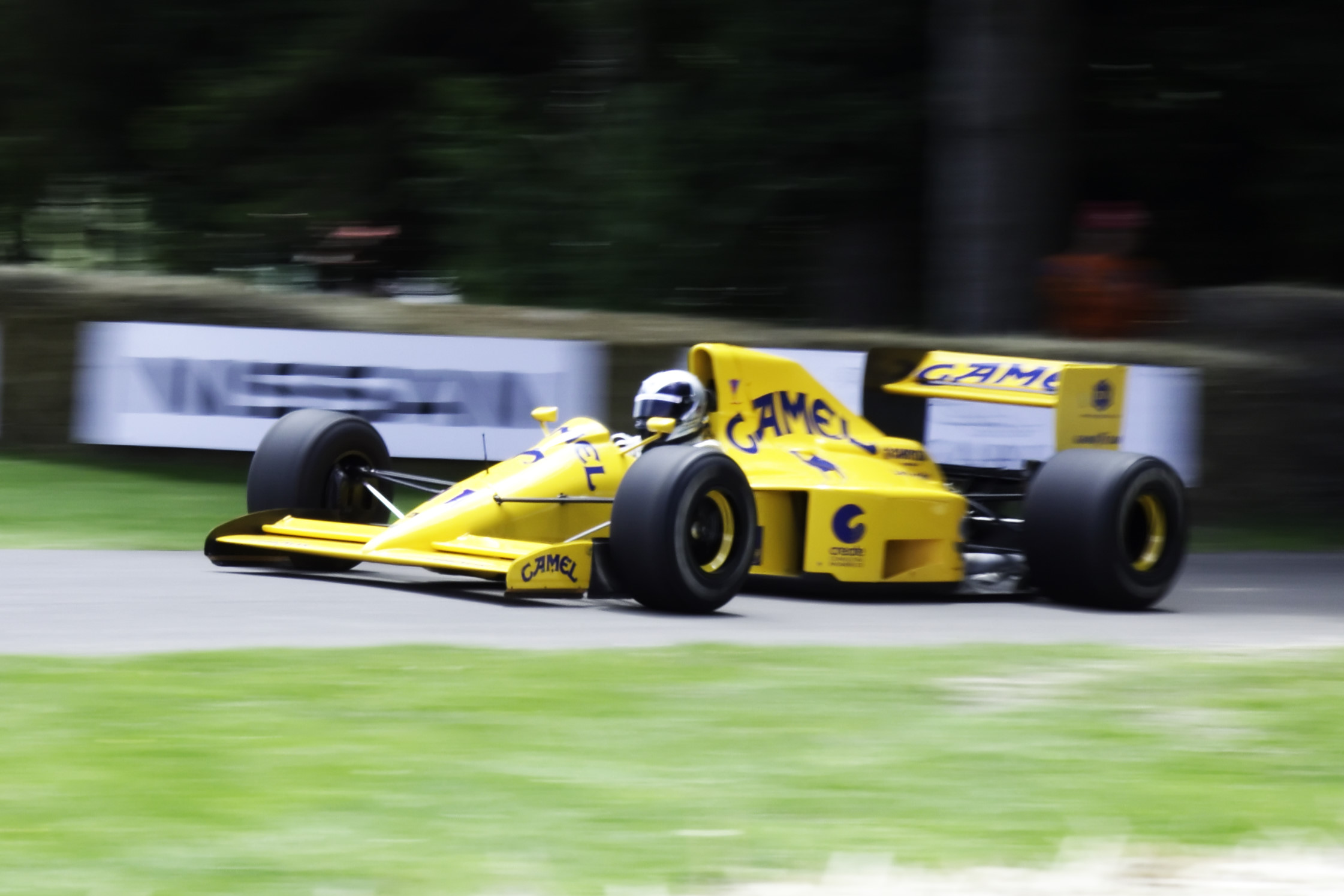
A Lotus 102 in Camel livery.

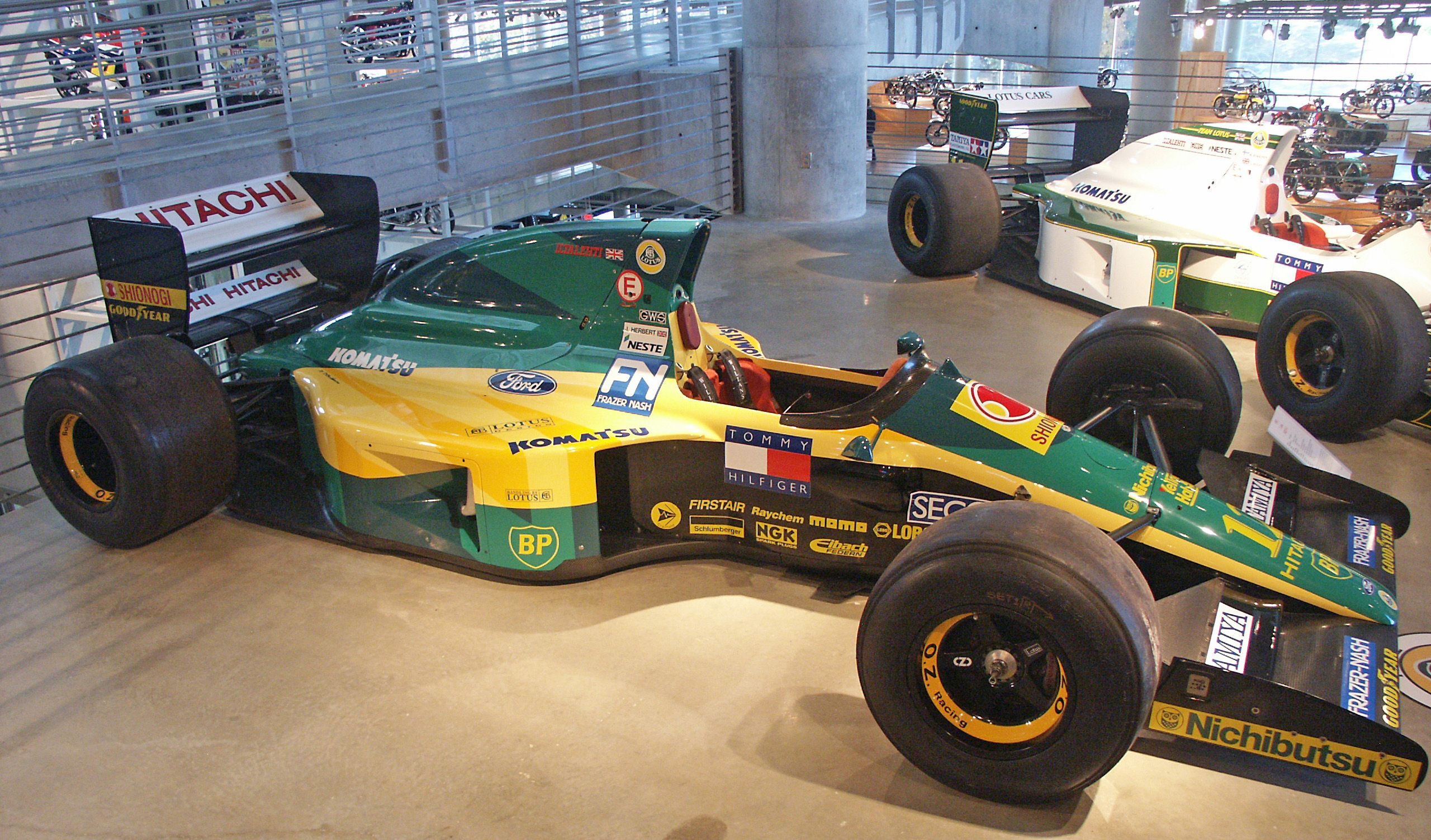
A Lotus 102D from 1992 in display

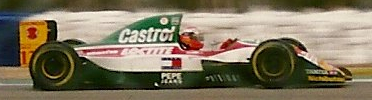
Johnny Herbert driving for Lotus at the 1993 British GP

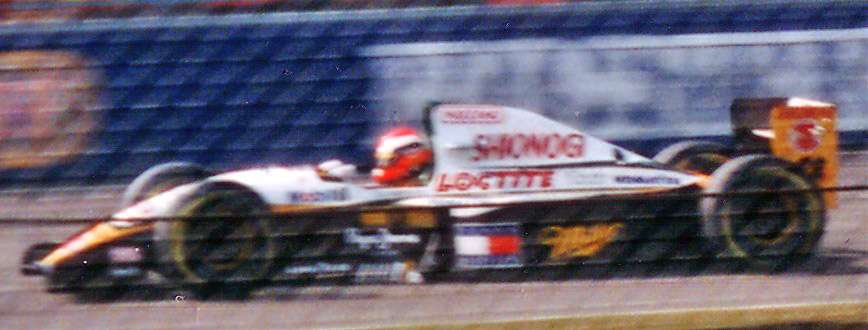
Johnny Herbert driving for Lotus at the 1994 British GP

== Lotus (2010–2011) ==
The new Lotus team, Lotus Racing and later Team Lotus, made its début in 2010. It competed with a license from Malaysia but used a British racing green livery similar to the original Team Lotus. The team was later renamed to Caterham in 2012 following a dispute on the usage of the Lotus name between team founder and principal Tony Fernandes and Group Lotus.

Year	Main colour(s)	Additional colour(s)	Main sponsor(s)	Additional major sponsor(s)
2010	British racing green	Gold, White	Tune Group	1Malaysia, Naza Group, Bridgestone, Proton, PACT, CNN, Cosworth, Maxis, LR8 Energy Drink, Hackett London
2011	British racing green	Gold, White	AirAsia, Caterham	1Malaysia, Naza Group, Renault, EQ8 Energy Drink, CNN, Dell, General Electric, Pirelli, Tune Group, PACT

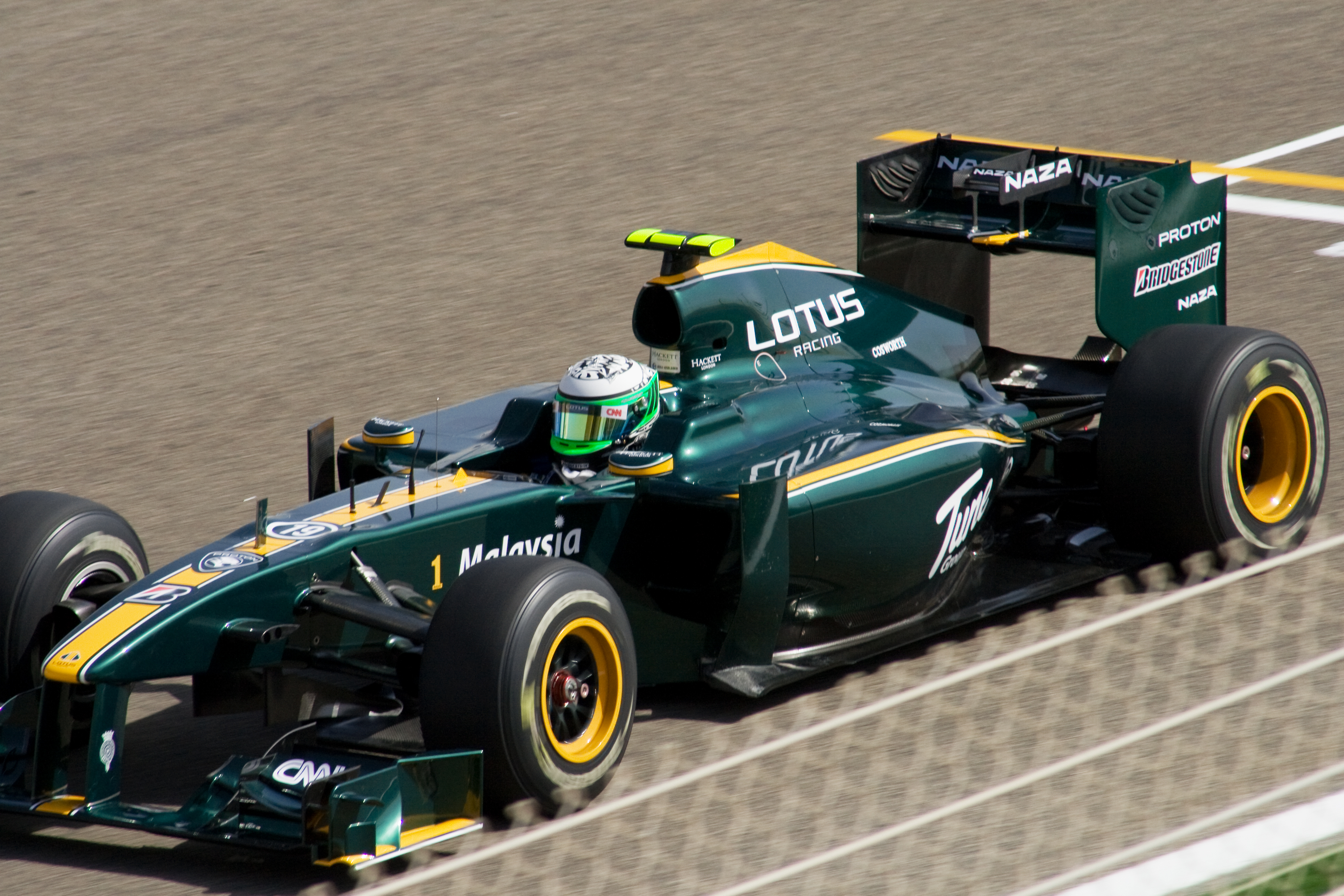
Heikki Kovalainen driving the Lotus T127 at the 2010 Bahrain Grand Prix, March 2010.

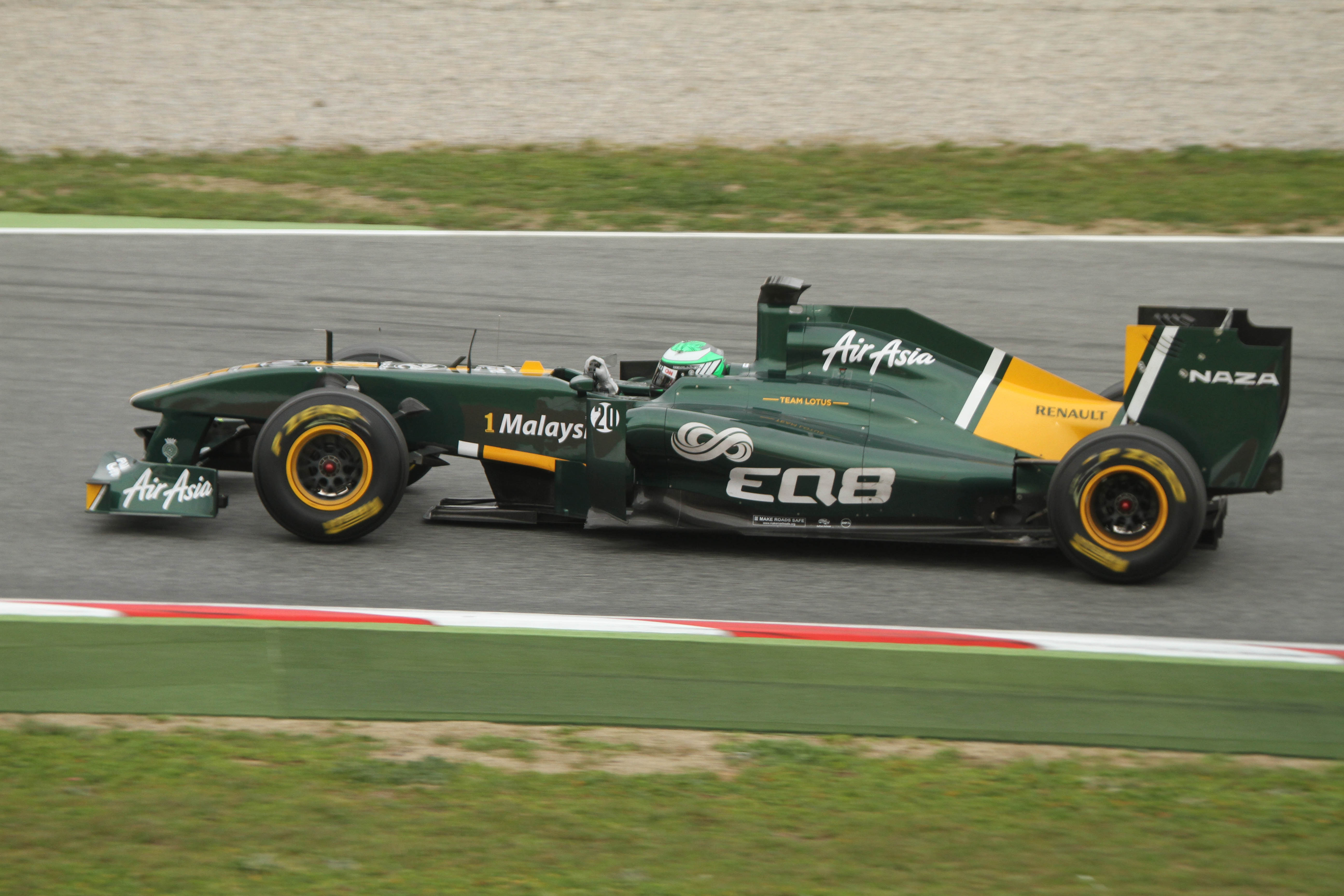
Heikki Kovalainen testing the Lotus T128 at the Circuit de Barcelona-Catalunya.

== Lotus (2012–2015) ==
Renault, then competing as Lotus Renault GP in 2011, was renamed Lotus F1 Team in 2012 following a dispute on the usage of the Lotus name between Group Lotus (who was allowed to use the "Lotus" name and roundel) and Lotus Racing/Team Lotus founder and team principal Tony Fernandes (who was allowed to only use the "Team Lotus" name and roundel). The team was owned by Luxembourg-based venture capital group Genii Capital (who bought a majority stake in Renault) and named after its branding partner Group Lotus. Its livery, introduced back in 2011 with the Renault R31, was designed as a tribute to the Team Lotus cars of 1981–1986 and their famous John Player Special liveries.

Year	Main colour(s)	Additional colour(s)	Livery sponsor(s)	Additional major sponsor(s)	Notes
2012	Black	Gold, Red	Lotus, Genii Capital	Total, Rexona/Sure/Degree, Clear, Trina Solar, TW Steel, Renault, Microsoft Dynamics, Avanade, Japan Rags, Advanced Global Trading, Auden Mckenzie Group, Pirelli	The team partnered with alternative rock band Linkin Park at the Monaco Grand Prix to promote an iPad application. The team promoted the movie The Dark Knight Rises at the British Grand Prix.
2013	Black, Red	Gold	Lotus, Genii Capital	Total, Rexona/Sure/Degree, Clear, Burn, Renault, Microsoft Dynamics, Columbia Records, Japan Rags, Advanced Global Trading, CNBC, Avanade, Auden Mckenzie Group, Peace One Day, Pirelli, Renault Samsung Motors	The Lotus livery changed a little for 2013, with both cars featuring their drivers' respective names near the top air intake.
2014	Black, Red	Gold	Lotus, Genii Capital	EMC, Total, Saxo Bank, Rexona/Sure/Degree, Clear, Burn, Renault, Microsoft Dynamics, Columbia Records, Yota Devices, Avanade, Richard Mille, Peace One Day, Venezuela Tourism, Pirelli, PDVSA	
2015	Black	Gold, Red	Lotus, Genii Capital	EMC, Pirelli, Saxo Bank, Microsoft Dynamics, Mercedes-Benz, Richard Mille, Altran, Yota Devices, CD-adapco, Peace One Day, Elysium Inc., Venezuela Tourism, Microsoft Lumia, PDVSA	The team promoted the movie Mad Max: Fury Road at the Spanish Grand Prix.

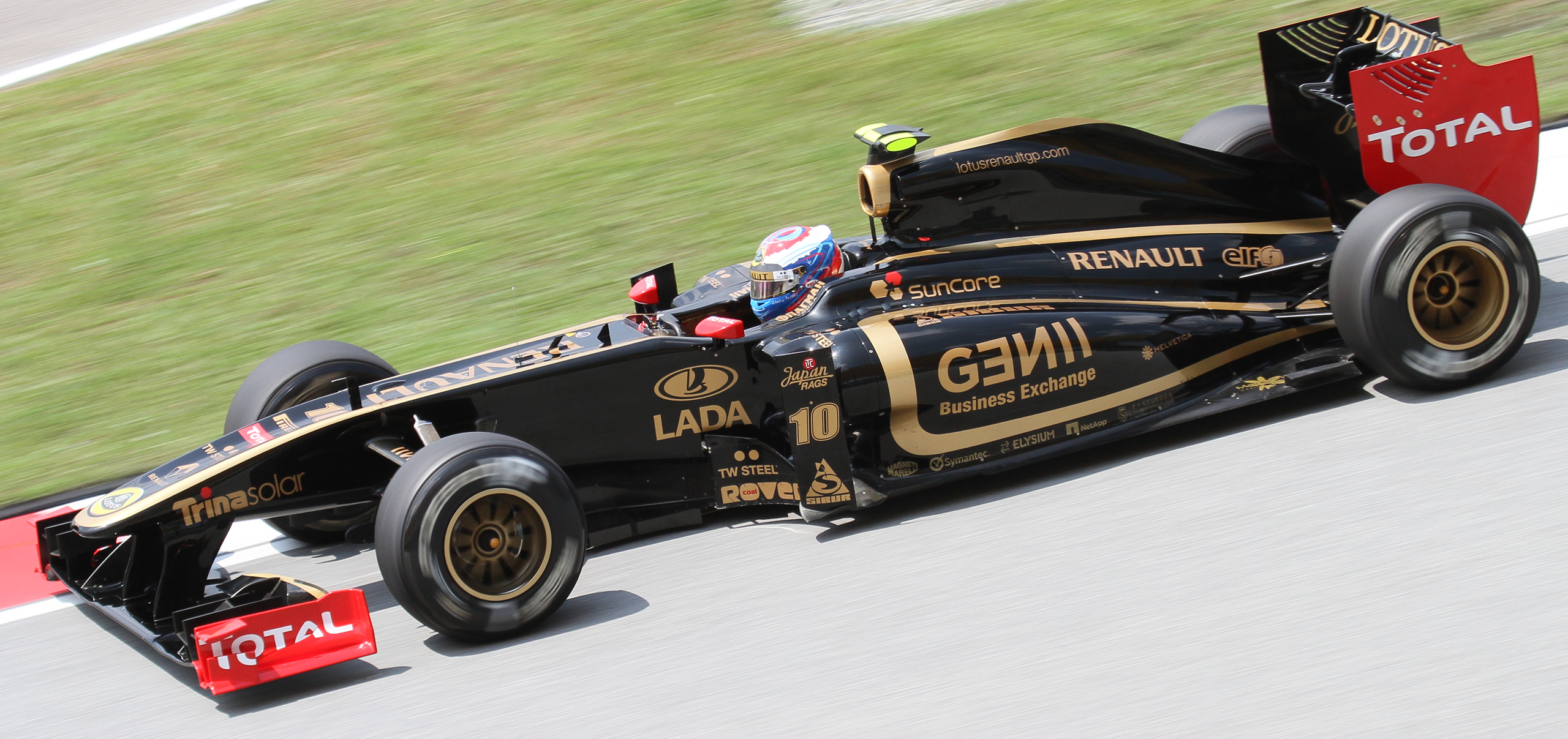
Renault R31 livery resembled old Lotus liveries one year before the team was renamed.

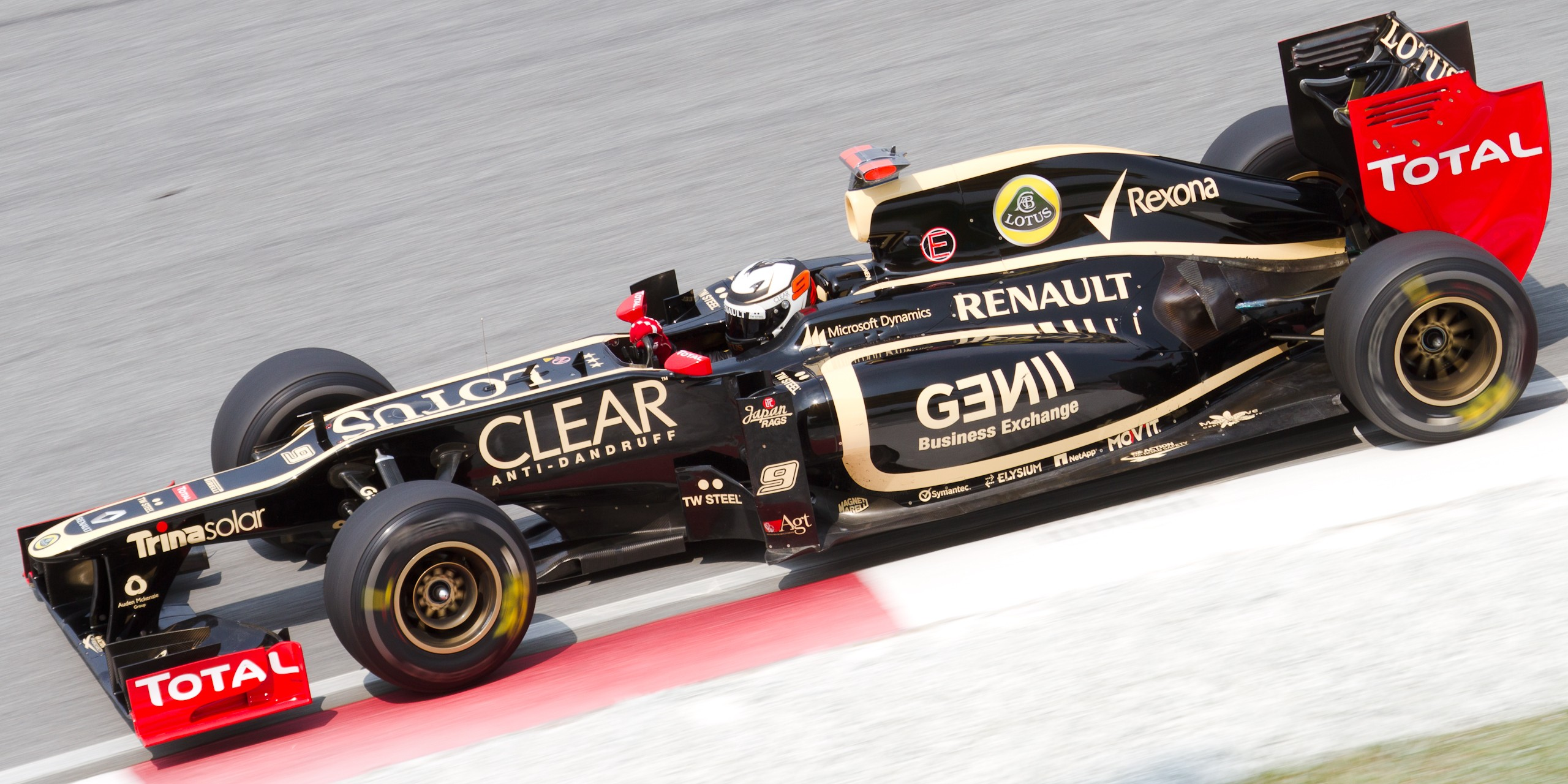
Kimi Räikkönen driving the Lotus E20 at the 2012 Malaysian Grand Prix.

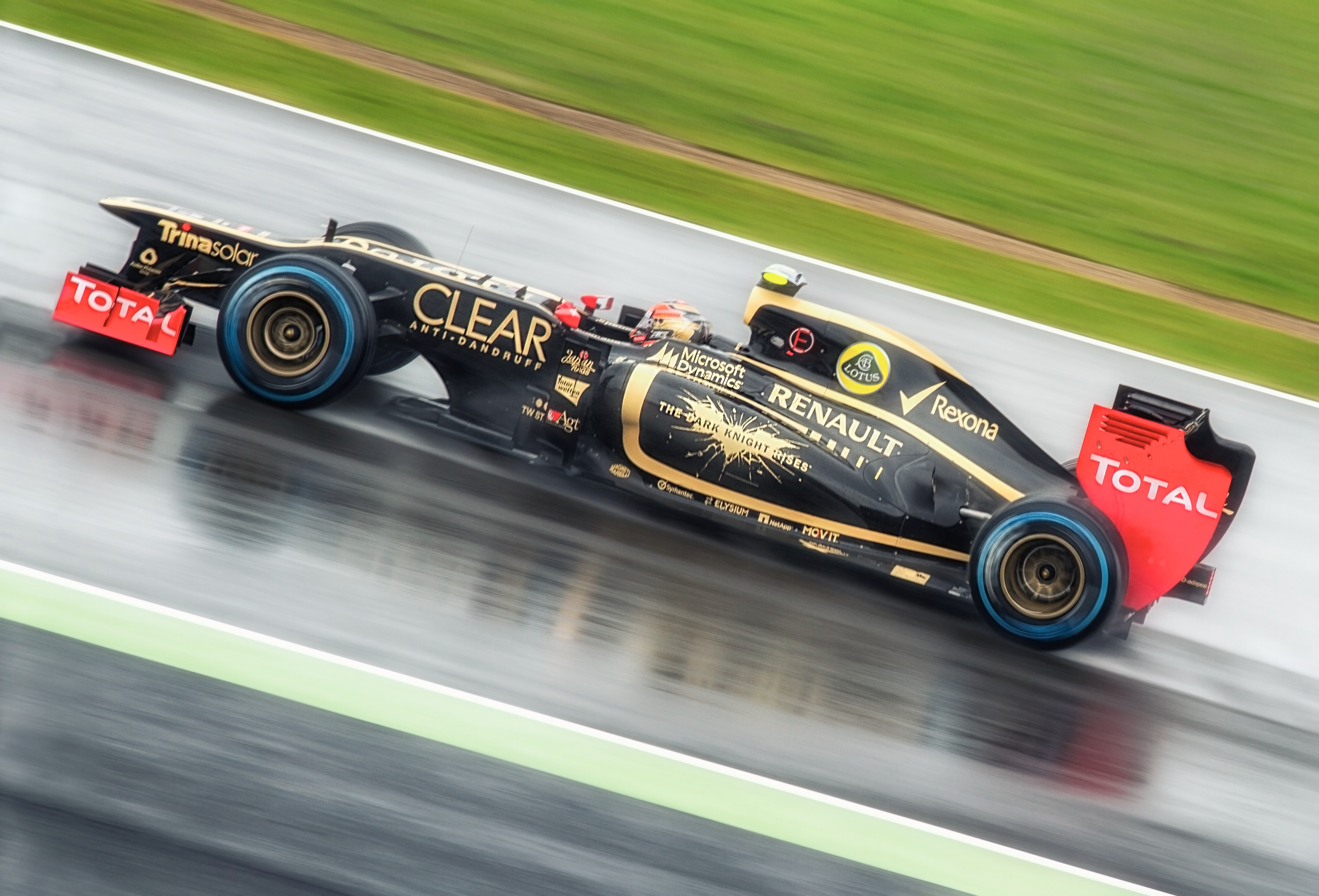
The special The Dark Knight Rises livery (2012).

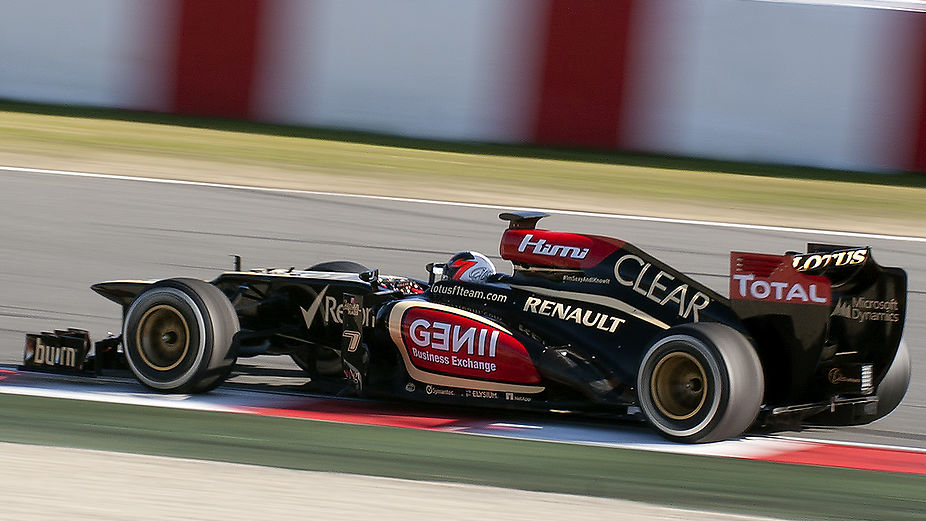
Kimi Räikkönen testing the Lotus E21 in Montmelo (2013).

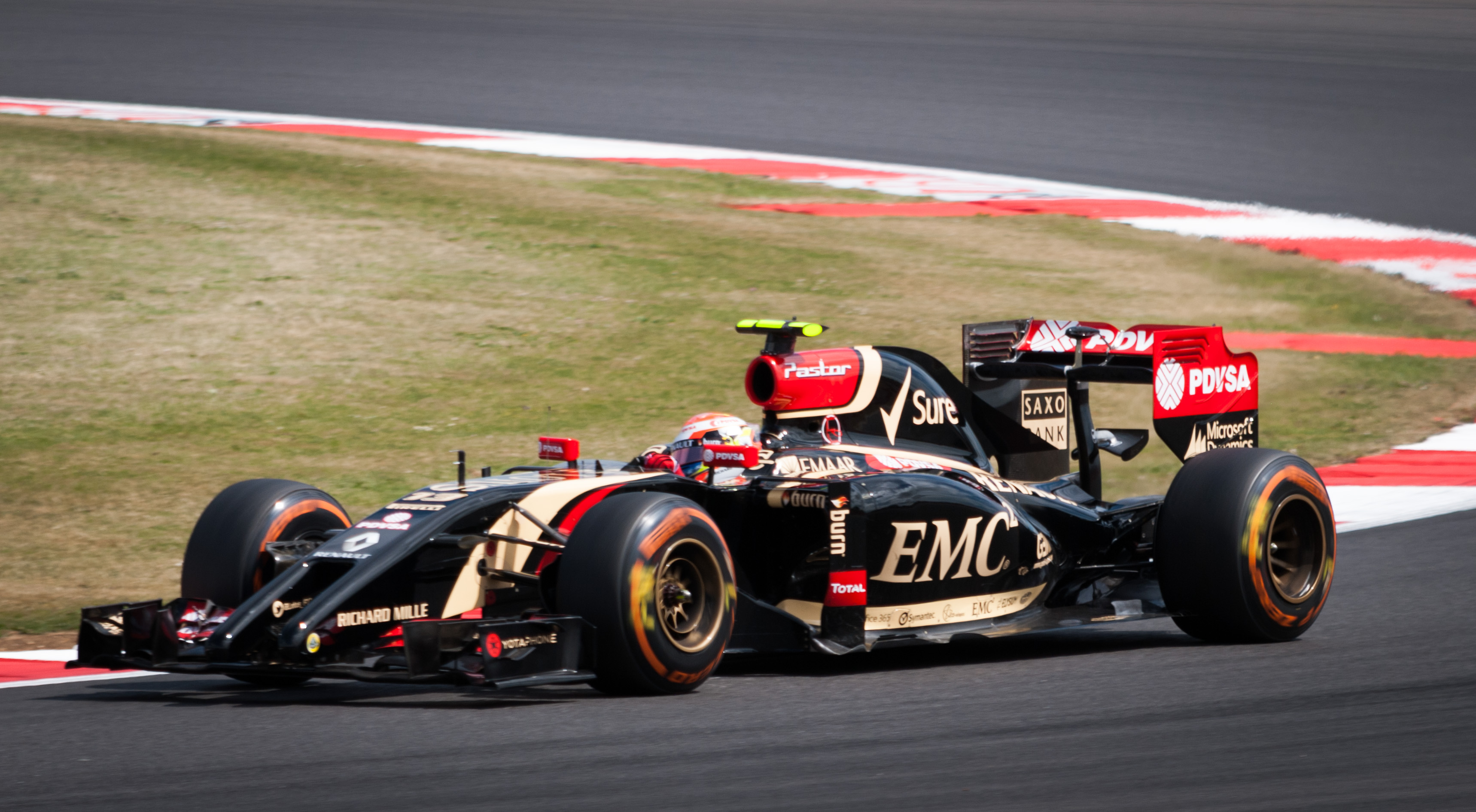
Pastor Maldonado brought PDVSA sponsorship to the team in 2014.

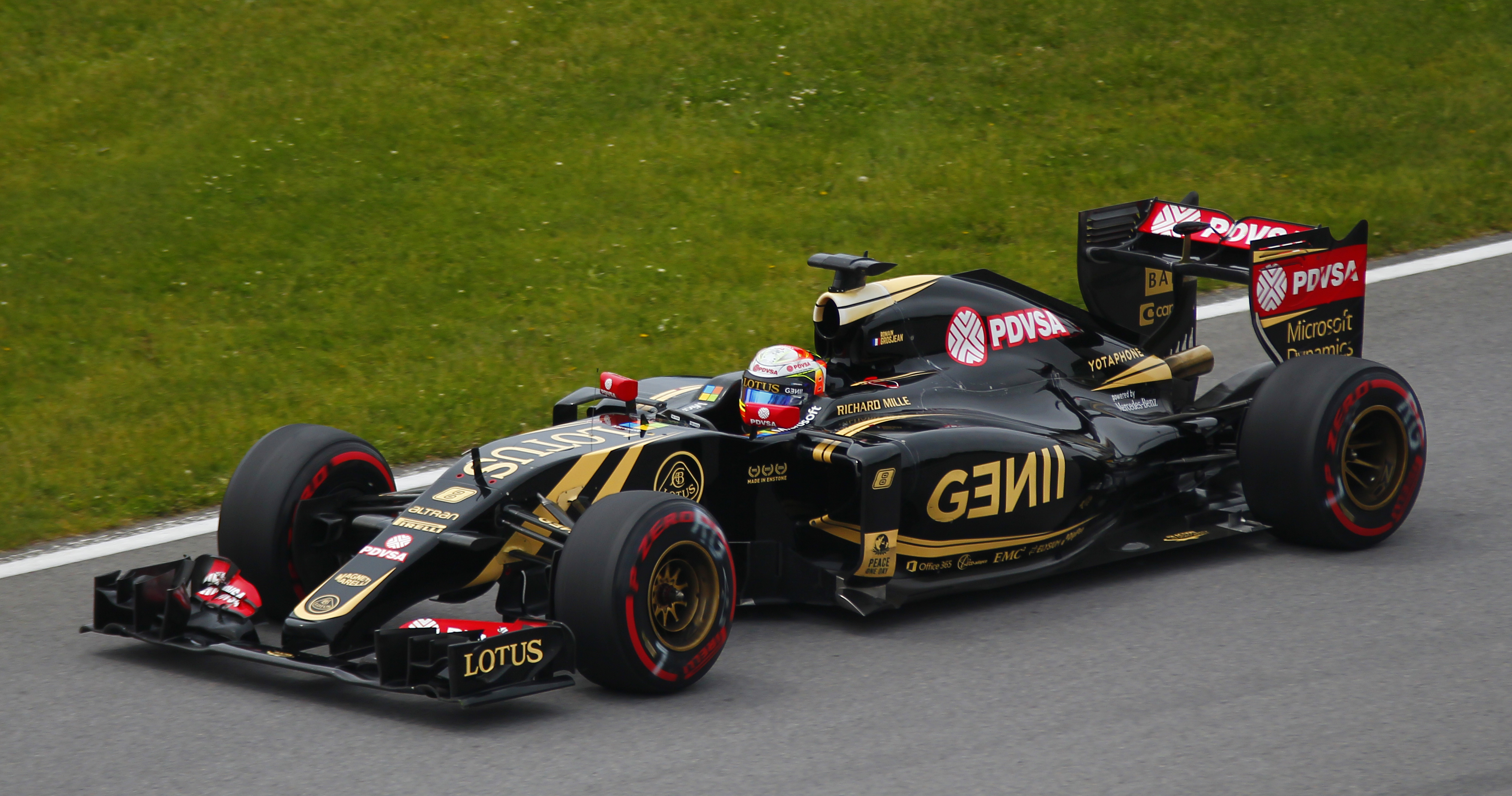
Romain Grosjean driving the Lotus E23 Hybrid at the 2015 Canadian Grand Prix.

== Maki ==
Year	Main colour(s)	Additional colour(s)	Livery sponsor(s)	Additional major sponsor(s)
1974	White	Red Circle	none	Firestone
1975	Blue		Citizen	Mecauto, Goodyear

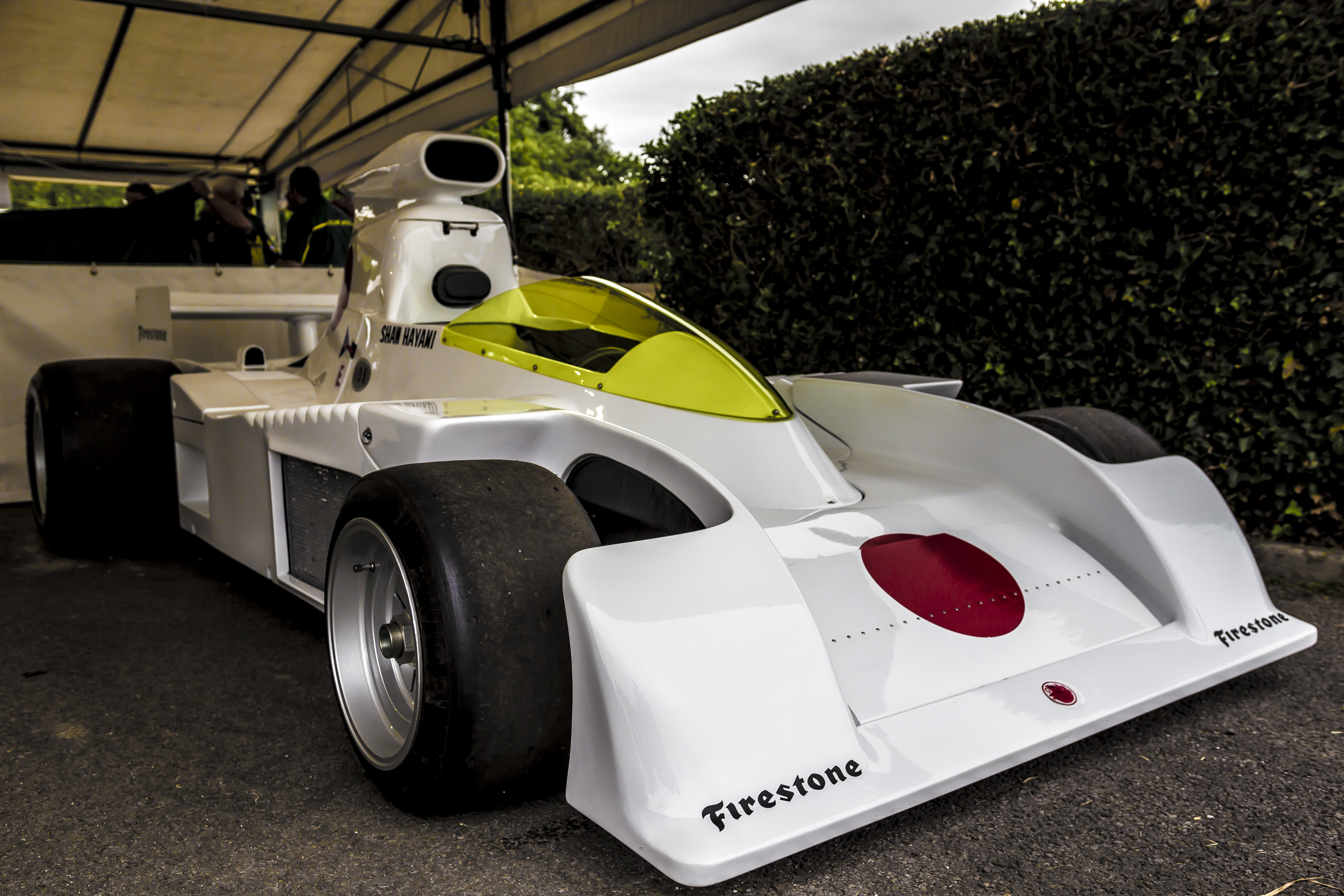
The Maki F101 from 1974 season.

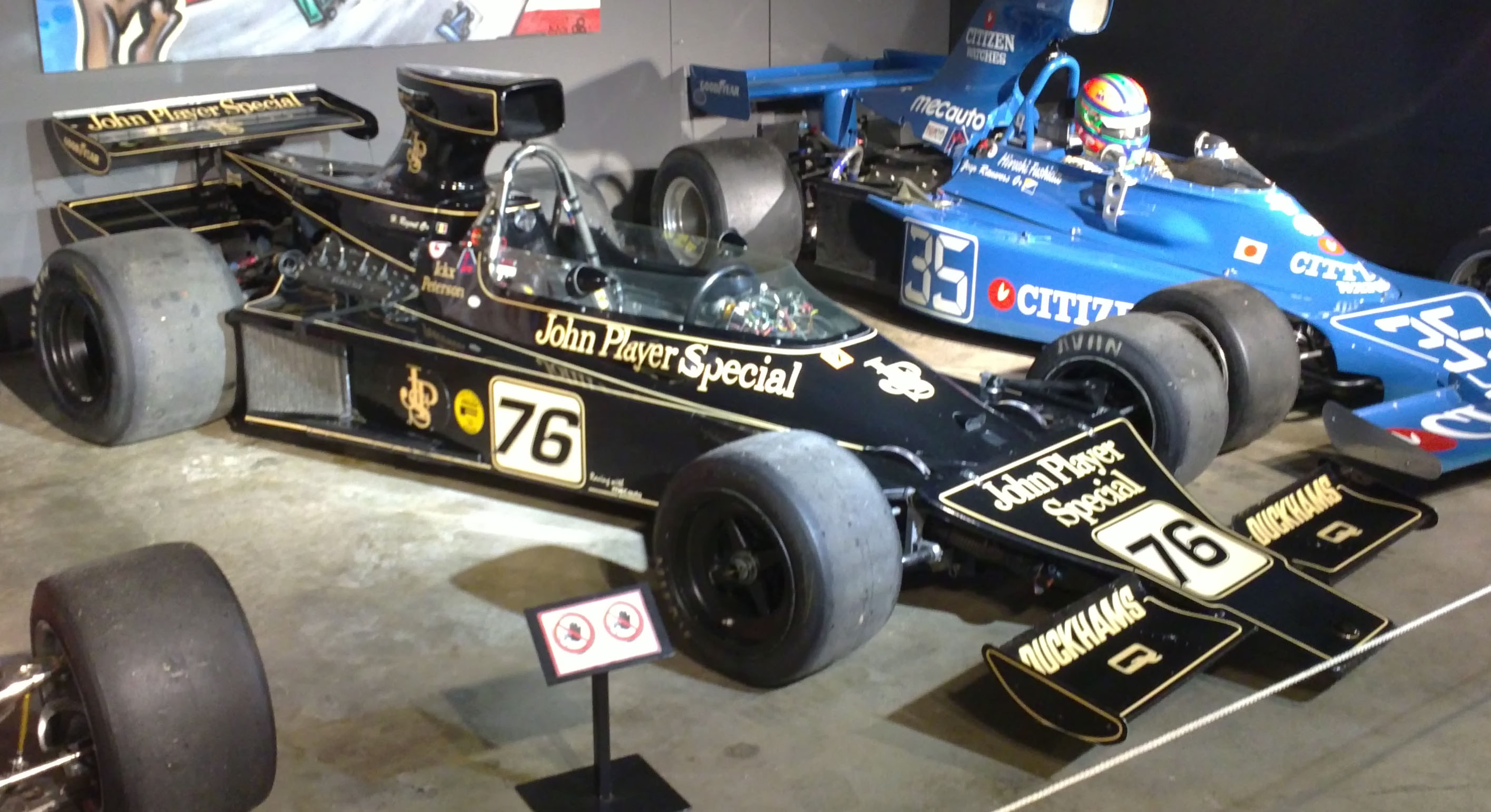
A Maki F101C (blue car) from the 1975 season.

== Manor ==
Manor entered Formula One in 2016 after being renamed from Marussia.

Year	Main colour(s)	Additional colour(s)	Livery sponsor(s)	Additional major sponsor(s)
2016	Red, Blue	White, Black		Pertamina (until German GP), Shazam, Pirelli, Daffy's, Rebellion, Rescale, Kiky (until German GP), Airbnb

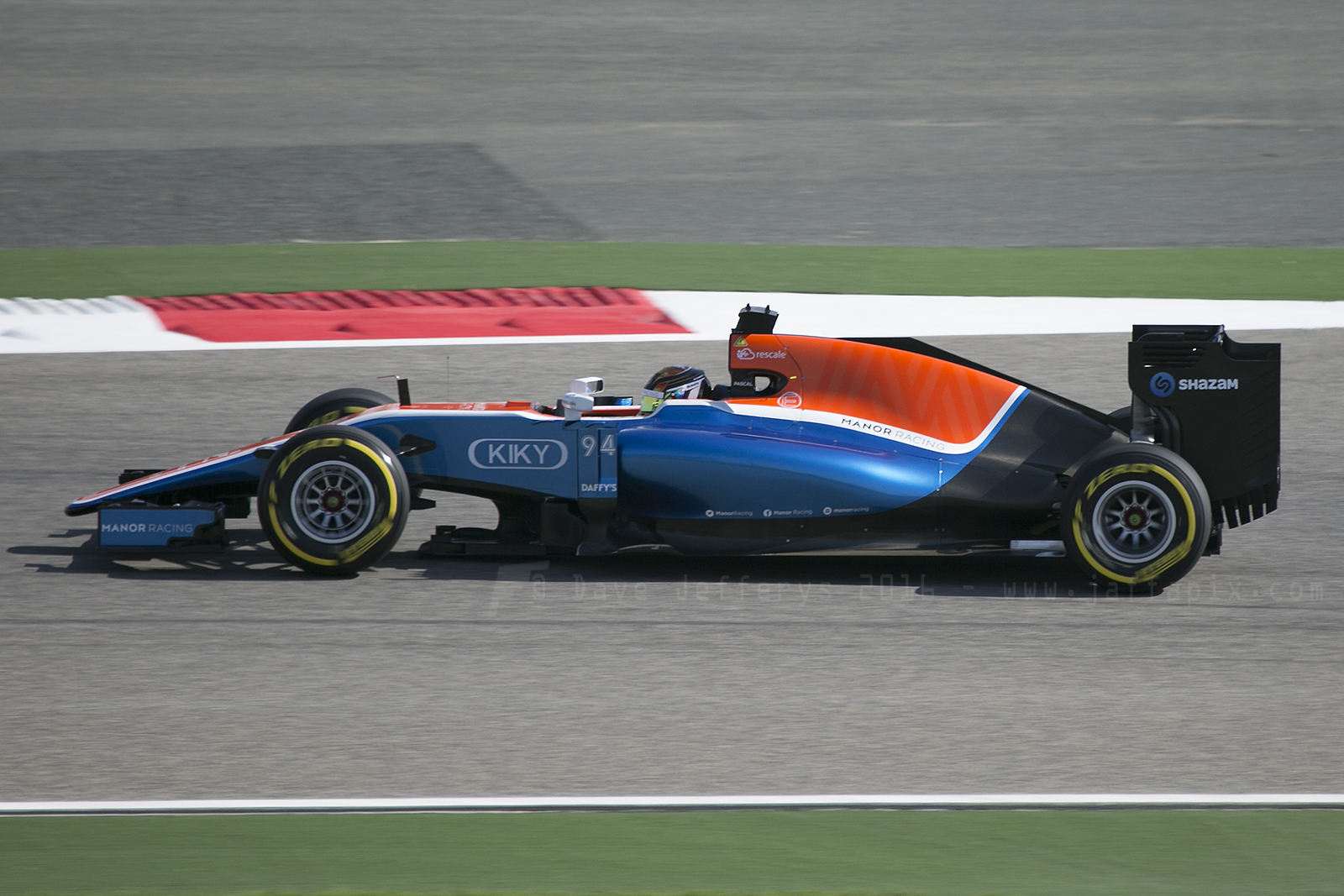
The Manor MRT05 from the 2016 season.

== March Engineering ==
In the mid-1970s, the works March team (March Engineering) often ran different sponsorship liveries on individual cars, under multiple entrant names.

Year	Driver(s)	Main colour(s)	Livery sponsor(s)	Additional major sponsor(s)
1970	Chris Amon; Jo Siffert	Red	STP	Bio-Strath, BP, Firestone, Ford, Menards
1971	Ronnie Peterson; Alex Soler-Roig; Andrea de Adamich; Nanni Galli; Mike Beuttler; Niki Lauda	Red	STP Oil Treatment	Firestone, Girling, Pastiglie SMOG Tabletter, Woolmark Eifelland Caravans (German Grand Prix only)
1972	Ronnie Peterson; Niki Lauda	Red	STP Oil Treatment	Champion, FINA, Ford, Girling, Goodyear, Levi's Jeans, Shell, Vick Cough Drops
1973	Jean-Pierre Jarier	Black		Champion, Goodyear, Kendall Motor Oil, Shell
1973	Jean-Pierre Jarier	Red	STP Oil Treatment	Meubles Marcel Arnold Sasol (South African Grand Prix only)
1973	Jean-Pierre Jarier	Red	STP Oil Treatment	Champion, FINA, Girling, Goodyear, Shell
1973	Henri Pescarolo	Red	STP Oil Treatment	Champion, FINA, Girling, Goodyear, Shell
1973	Roger Williamson	Red	STP Oil Treatment	Champion, FINA, Girling, Goodyear, Shell
1973	Roger Williamson	Red	STP Oil Treatment	Tom Wheatcroft Racing
1974	Vittorio Brambilla	Orange	Beta Utensili	Champion, Goodyear, Valvoline
1974	Howden Ganley	Dark Green		Champion, Goodyear
1974	Hans-Joachim Stuck	Dark Green		Champion, Goodyear
1974	Hans-Joachim Stuck	Orange	JägermeiÍter	Champion, Goodyear
1974	Reine WIsell	Orange	Vastkust-Stugan	Canon, Levi's Jeans, Tor Line, Valvoline
1975	Vittorio Brambilla	Orange	Beta Utensili	Champion, Ferodo, Goodyear
1975	Lella Lombardi	White	Lavazza, Elf	AGV, Champion, Goodyear
1975	Hans-Joachim Stuck	White	Lavazza, Elf	AGV, Champion, Goodyear
1976	Vittorio Brambilla	Orange	Beta Utensili	Champion, Goodyear
1976	Lella Lombardi	Yellow	Lavazza	Champion, Goodyear
1976	Ronnie Peterson	Yellow and Blue	Swedish flag	Champion, Duckhams, FINA, Goodyear, Shell
1976	Ronnie Peterson	Yellow and Blue	Monaco Fine Arts Gallery (Monaco Grand Prix only)	Champion, Duckhams, FINA, Goodyear, Shell
1976	Ronnie Peterson	Yellow and Blue	Duckhams (French Grand Prix only)	Champion, Duckhams, FINA, Goodyear, Shell
1976	Ronnie Peterson	Yellow and Blue	Macconal-Mason Gallery Fine Paintings (British Grand Prix only)	Champion, Duckhams, FINA, Goodyear, Shell
1976	Ronnie Peterson	Red, White and Blue	First National City Travelers Checks	Champion, Duckhams, FINA, Goodyear, Shell
1976	Ronnie Peterson	Red, White and Blue	John Day Model Cars (Dutch Grand Prix only)	Champion, Duckhams, FINA, Goodyear, Shell
1976	Ronnie Peterson	White	Theodore Racing Hong Kong (United States Grand Prix West only)	
1976	Hans-Joachim Stuck	White	Theodore Racing Hong Kong (United States Grand Prix West only)	Champion, Goodyear, Valvoline Monaco Fine Arts Gallery (Monaco Grand Prix only) Macconal-Mason Gallery Fine Paintings (British Grand Prix only)
1976	Hans-Joachim Stuck	White	John Day Model Cars	Champion, Goodyear, Valvoline Monaco Fine Arts Gallery (Monaco Grand Prix only) Macconal-Mason Gallery Fine Paintings (British Grand Prix only)
1976	Hans-Joachim Stuck	Orange	JägermeiÍter	Champion, Goodyear, Valvoline Monaco Fine Arts Gallery (Monaco Grand Prix only) Macconal-Mason Gallery Fine Paintings (British Grand Prix only)
1976	Arturo Merzario	White	Ovoro	Champion, FINA, Goodyear, Marlboro
1977	Alex Ribeiro	Red	Hollywood	Goodyear, Caixa, Jesus Saves, Rastro, Champion, Koni
1977	Ian Scheckter Brian Henton	Blue	Rothmans International	Goodyear, Champion, Valvoline
1977	Ian Scheckter Brian Henton	White	Sportsman Lager	Goodyear, Champion, Valvoline
1977	Hans-Joachim Stuck	White	Lexington Racing	Goodyear, Champion, Valvoline
1981	Derek Daly	Black, White	Guinness, Rizla+.	EMCO Drehmaschinen, Esso, E-Z Wider, ICI Chemical & Plastics, Mangels Wheels, Moulin Rouge, Rainbow Jeanswear, Ultramar, Valvoline
1981	Eliseo Salazar	Black, White	Din, Rizla+.	Esso, Joker, Michelin, Tacora, Tecfin, Toyota
1982	Jochen Mass	Black and Green White and Blue	Newsweek, Rizla+. (South African Grand Prix only) Rothmans International (Brazilian Grand Prix onwards)	Banco Comind, Café do Brasil, Embratur, ICI Record, Miti SpA, Newsweek, Rizla+., Valvoline
1982	Rupert Keegan	Black and Green White and Blue	Newsweek, Rizla+. (South African Grand Prix only) Rothmans International (Brazilian Grand Prix onwards)	Banco Comind, Café do Brasil, Embratur, ICI Record, Miti SpA, Newsweek, Rizla+., Valvoline
1982	Raul Boesel	Black and Green White and Blue	Newsweek, Rizla+. (South African Grand Prix only) Rothmans International (Brazilian Grand Prix onwards)	Banco Comind, Café do Brasil, Embratur, ICI Record, Miti SpA, Newsweek, Rizla+., Valvoline
1982	Emilio de Villota	Blue	LBT Synthetic Engine Oil	Crysen Corporation, Rizla+., Texas UK, Visit Spain
1987	Ivan Capelli	Light Blue	Leyton House	Cobra
1988	Ivan Capelli Maurício Gugelmin	Light Blue	Leyton House	Diesel, Annic, Cobra, Diavia, Osama
1989	Ivan Capelli Maurício Gugelmin	Light Blue	Leyton House	BP, Annic, Osama, Diavia
1990	Ivan Capelli Maurício Gugelmin	Light Blue	Leyton House	BP, Annic, Osama, Diavia, Carglass
1991	Ivan Capelli Maurício Gugelmin Karl Wendlinger	Light Blue	Leyton House	BP, Annic, Osama, Diavia, Autoglass
1992	Karl Wendlinger Paul Belmondo Emanuele Naspetti Jan Lammers	Light Blue	Uliveto, BFI, Rizla+, Blaupunkt, Autoglass	BP, Rial, Bon Appetit, Sportrack, Antera Wheels, Corona.

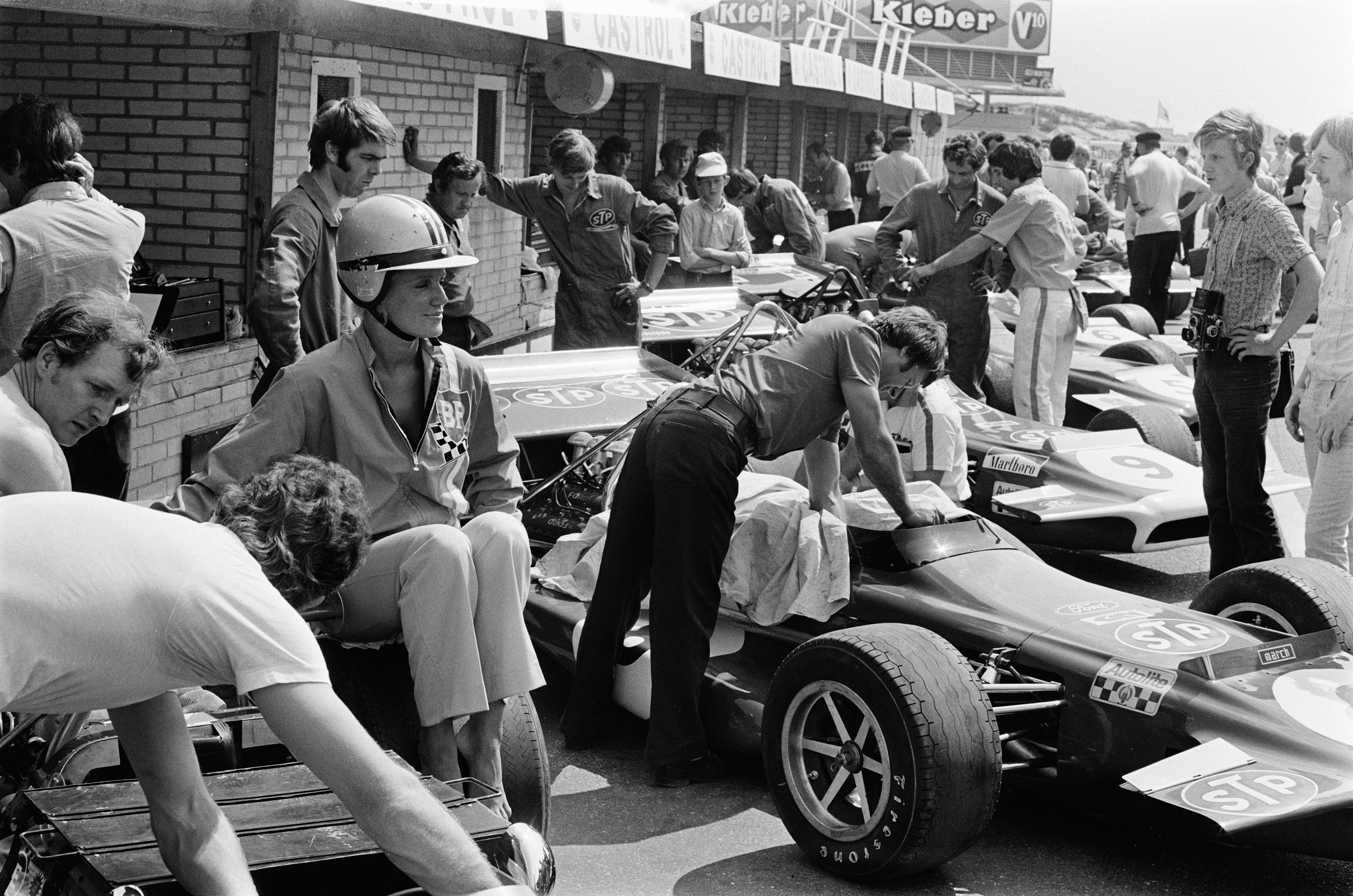
Official Team and Tyrrell-entered March 701 racing cars at the pits during 1970 Dutch Grand Prix.

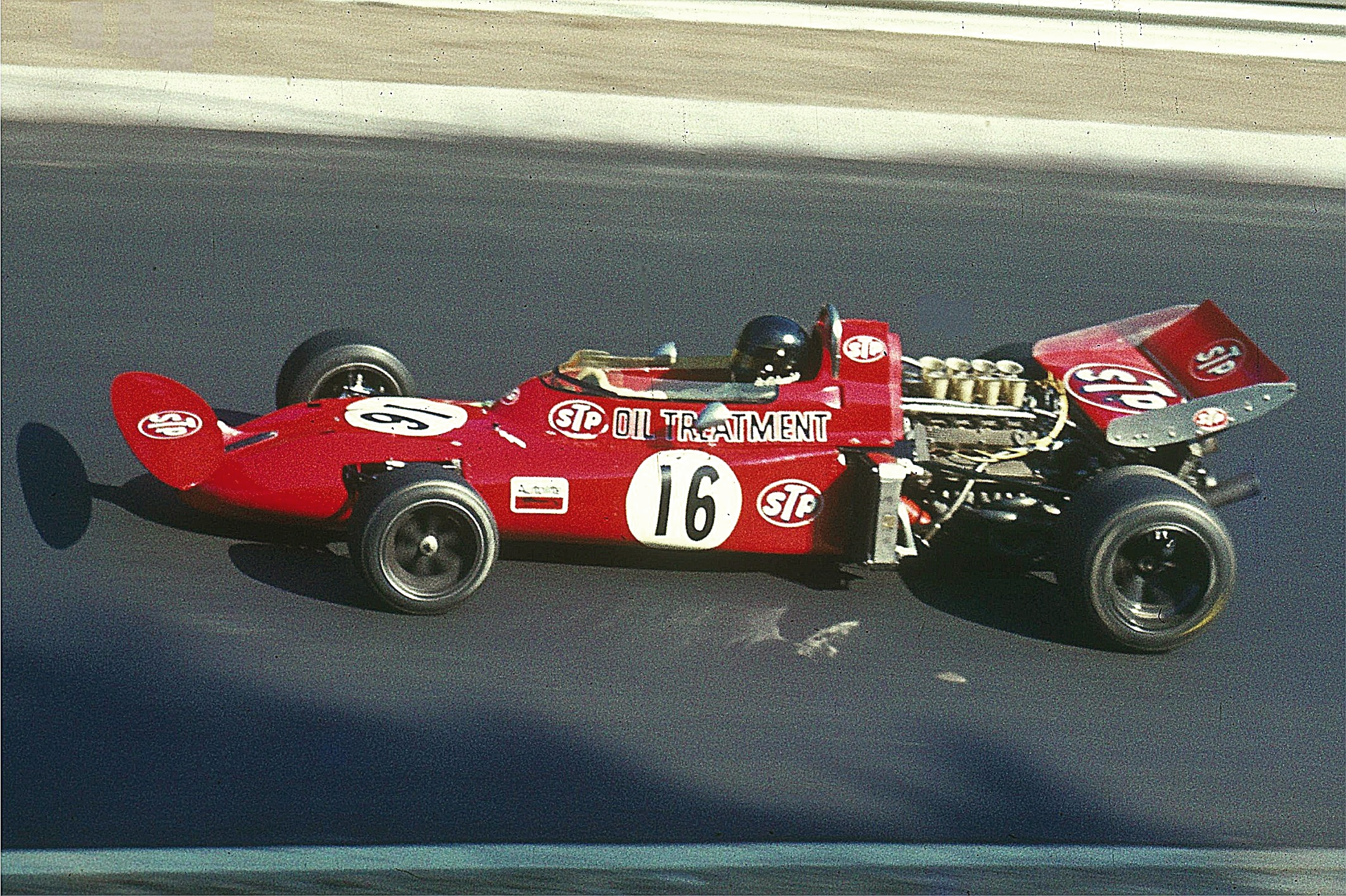
Andrea de Adamich racing for March at the 1971 German Grand Prix

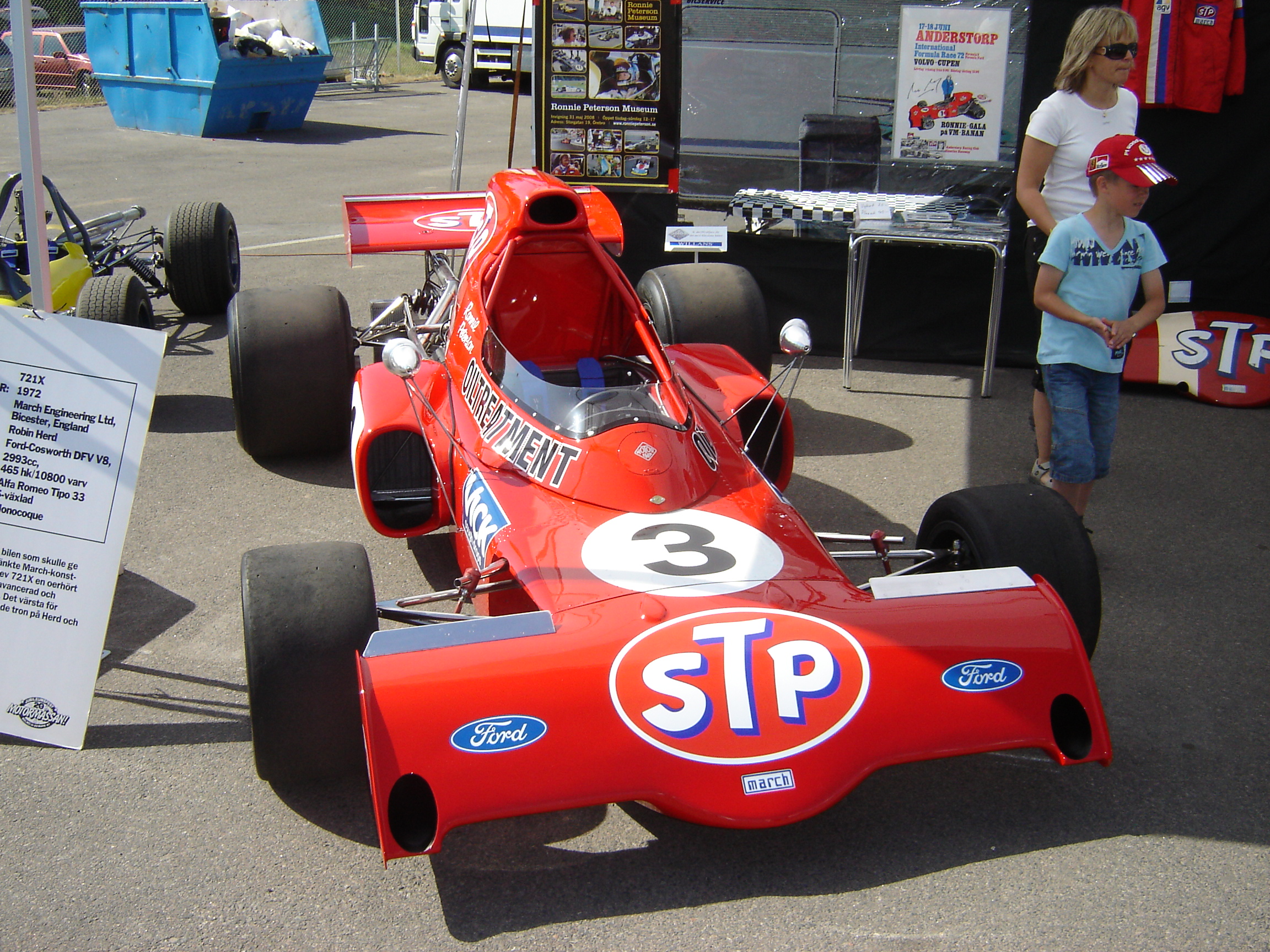
Ronnie Peterson's March 721 from 1972 season

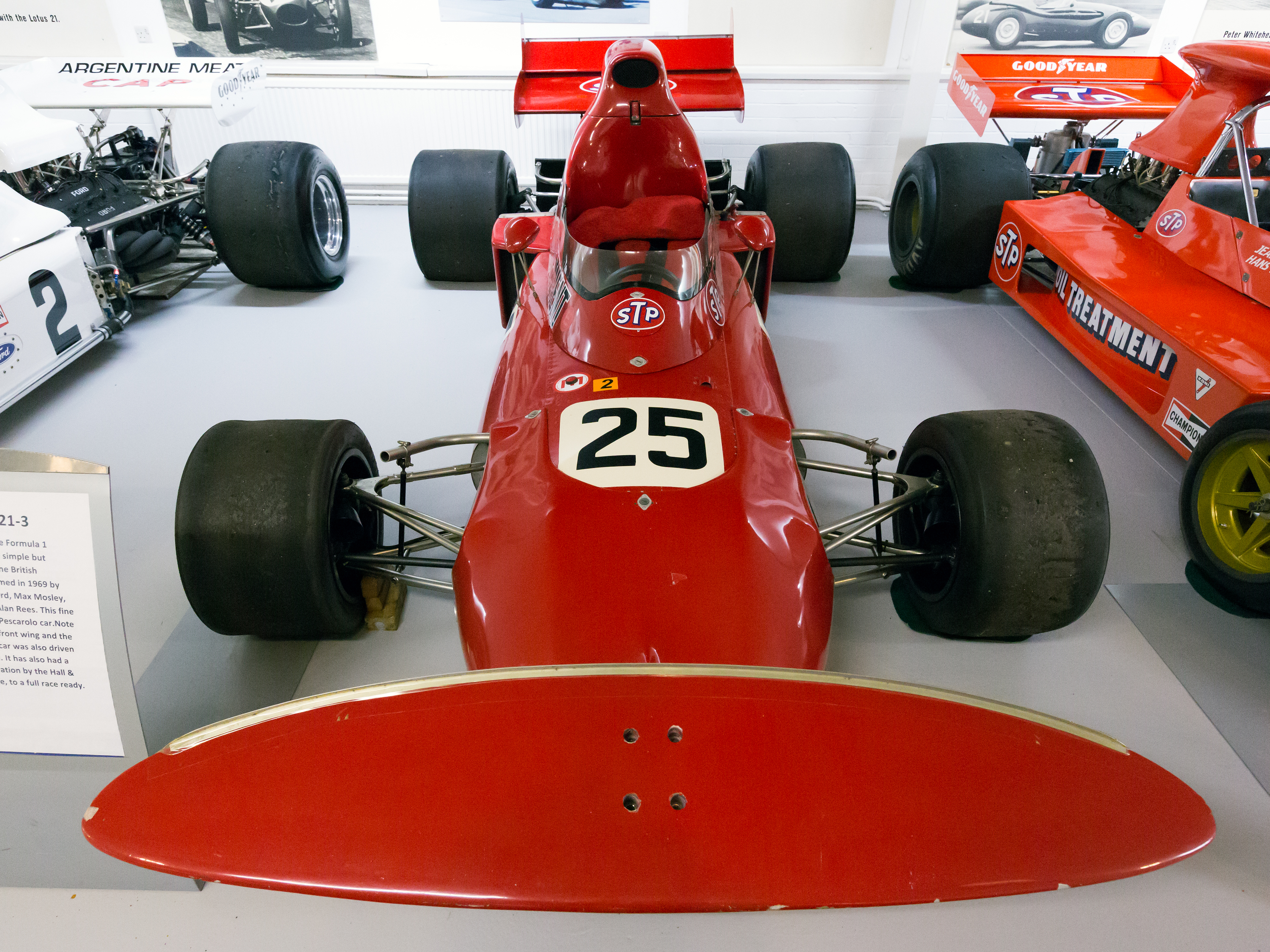
A March from the 1972 season at the Donington Grand Prix Collection

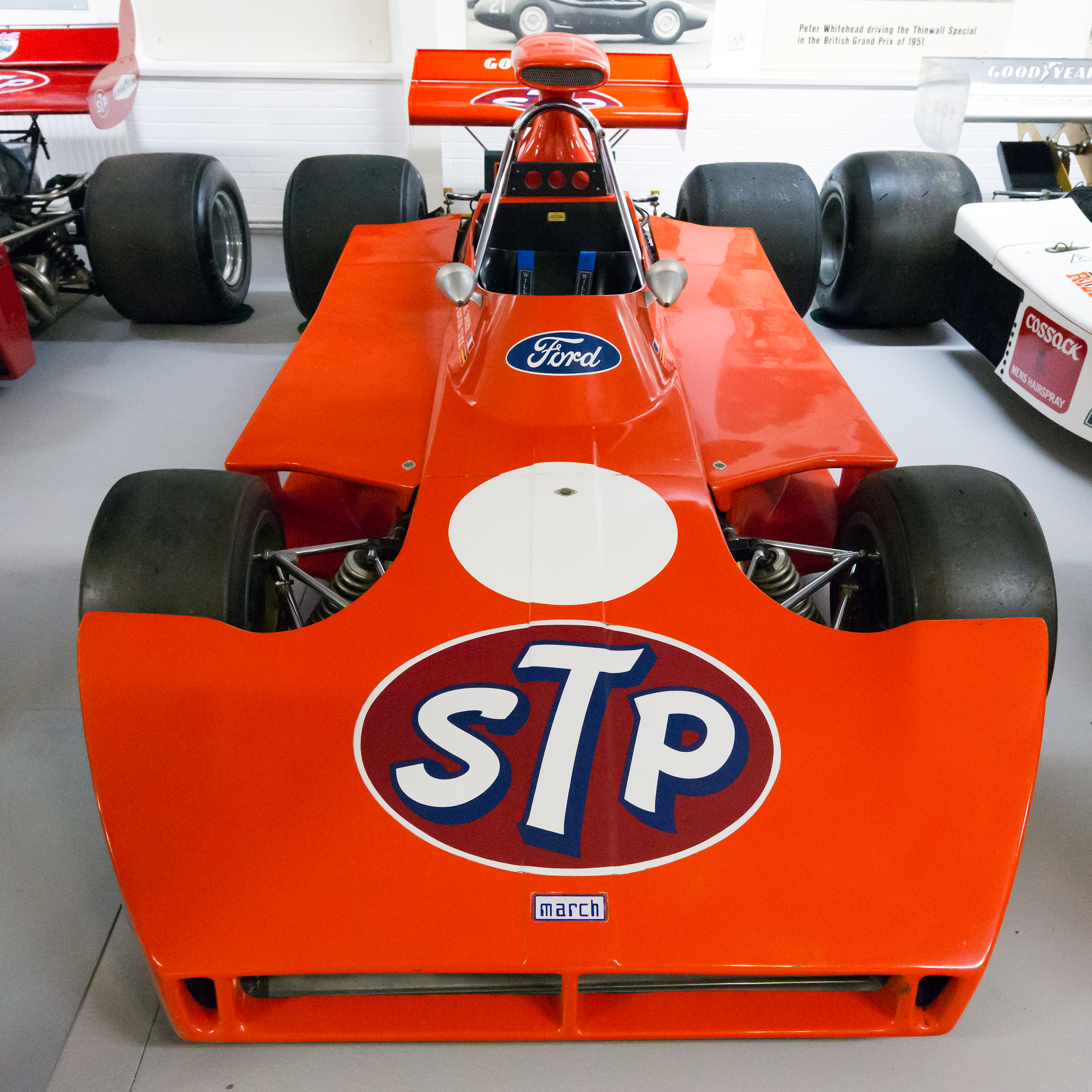
A March from the 1973 season at the Donington Grand Prix Collection

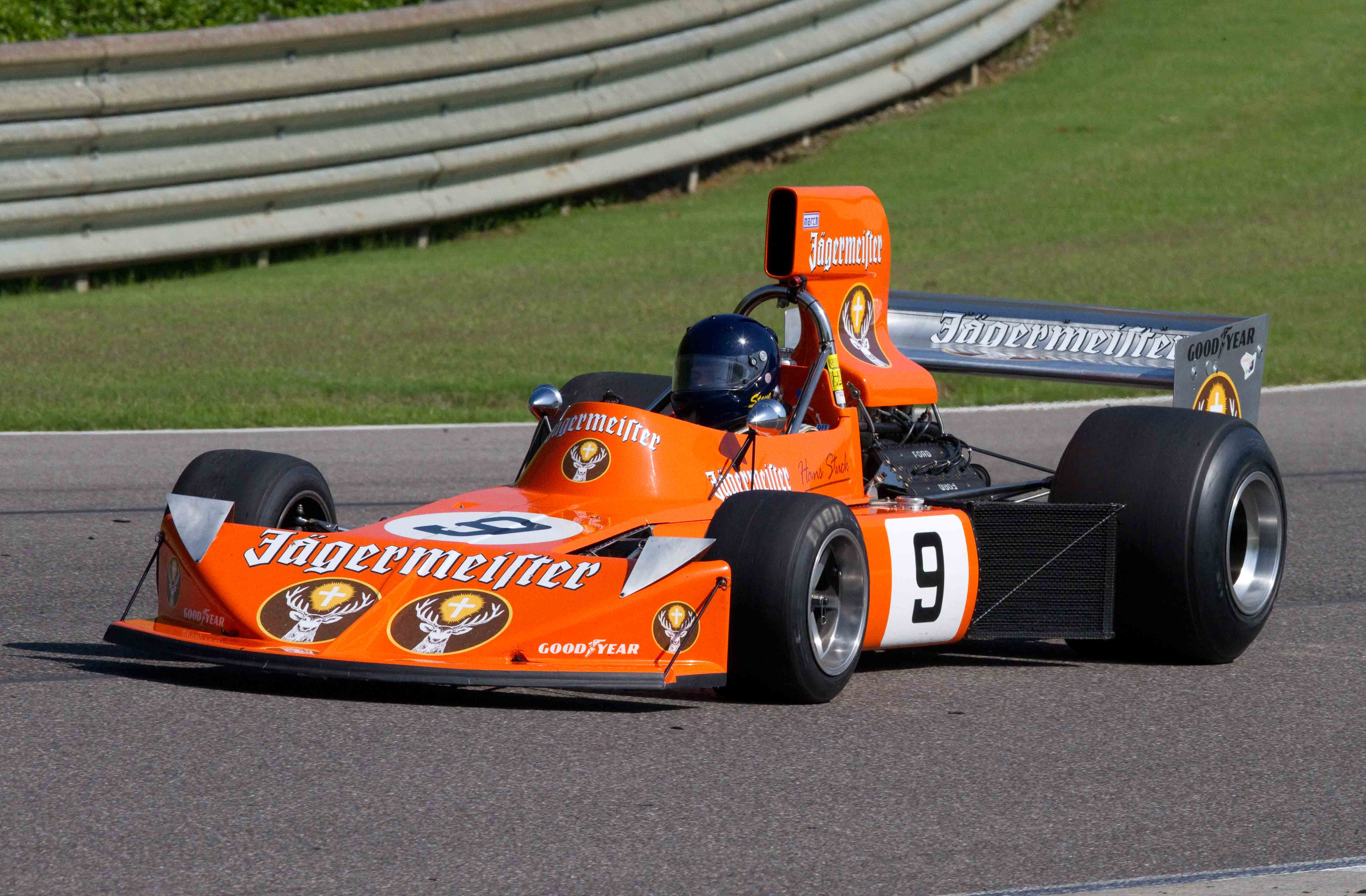
Hans-Joachim Stuck's March 741 from 1974 March 741 being demonstrated at Barber Motorsports Park

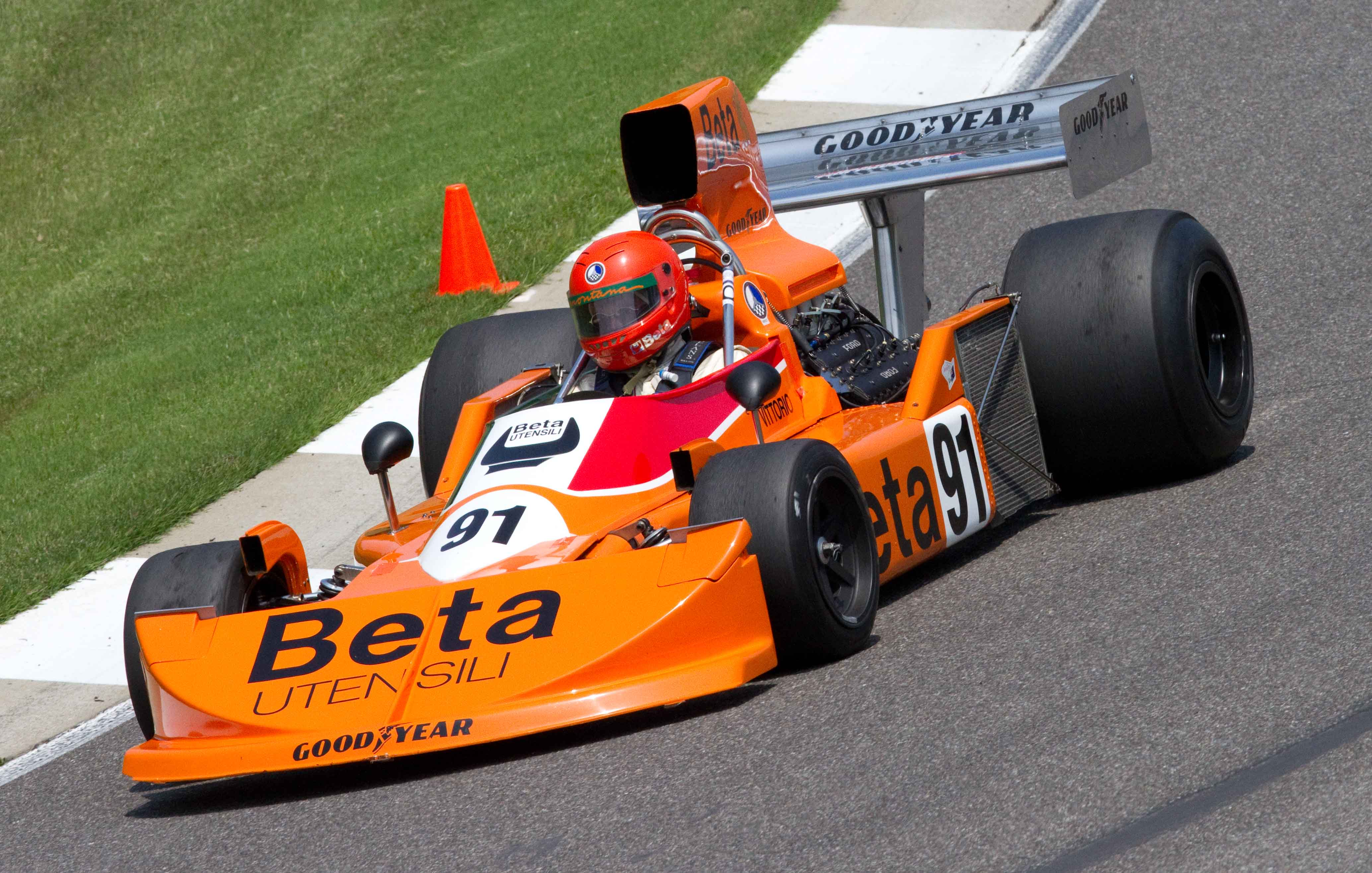
Vittorio Brambilla's March 751 from 1975 being demonstrated at Barber Motorsports Park

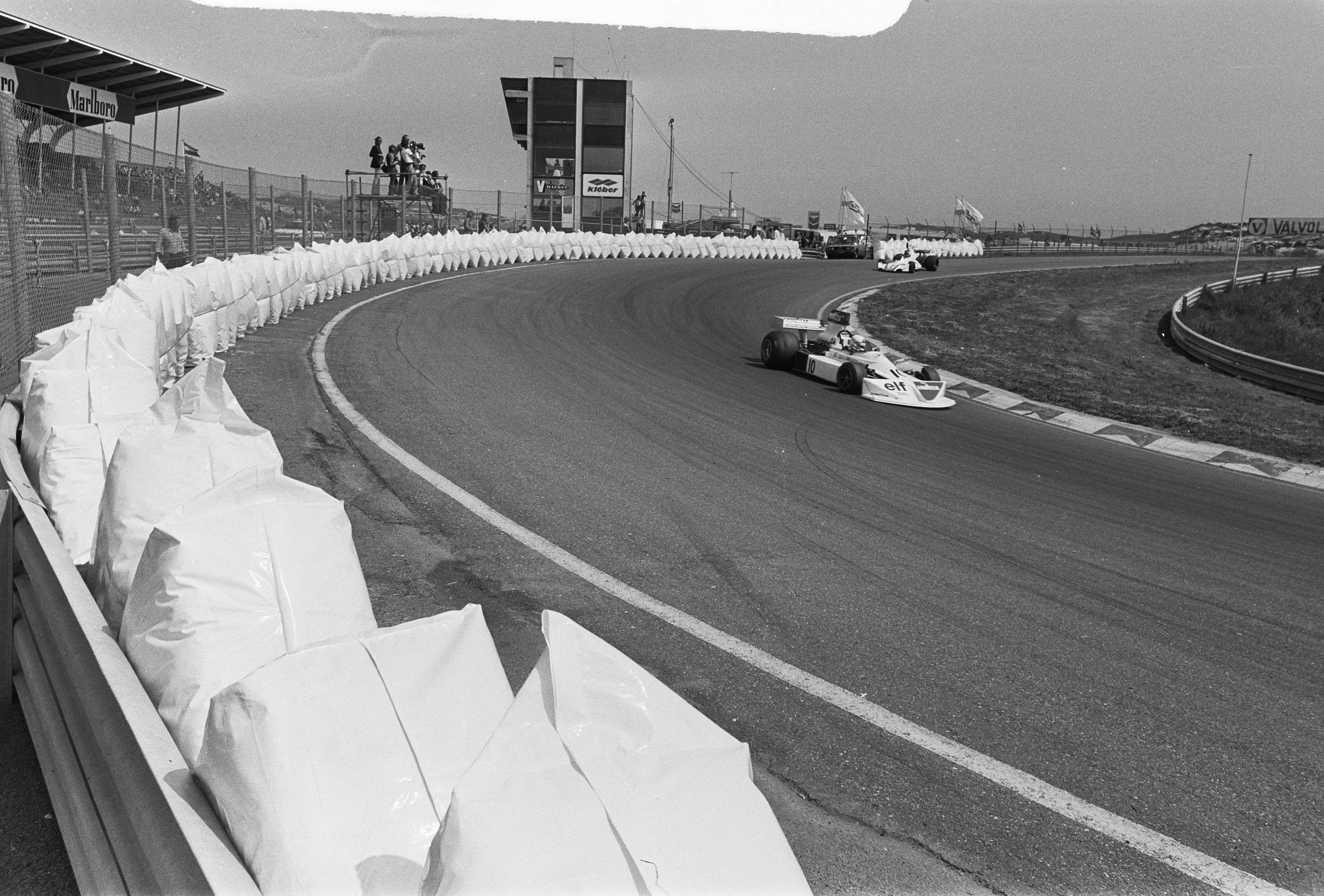
Lella Lombardi driving at 1975 Dutch Grand Prix

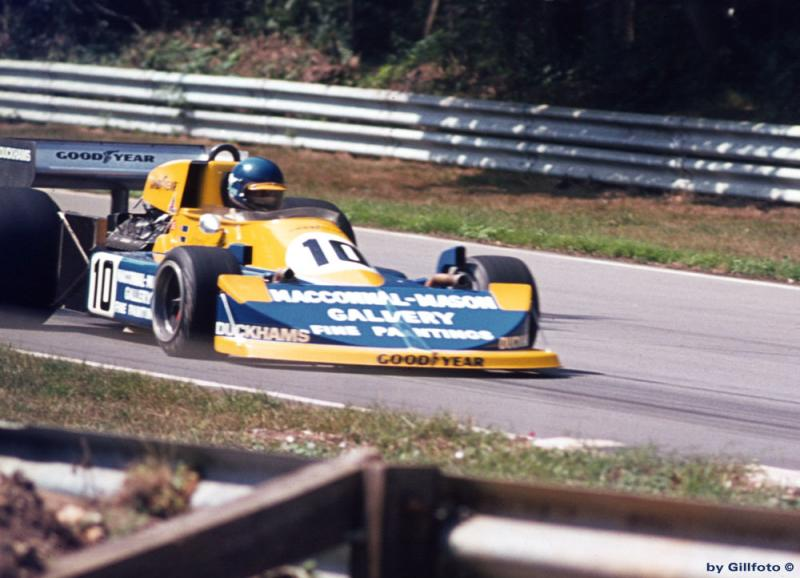
Ronnie Peterson driving for March Engineering at 1977 British Grand Prix

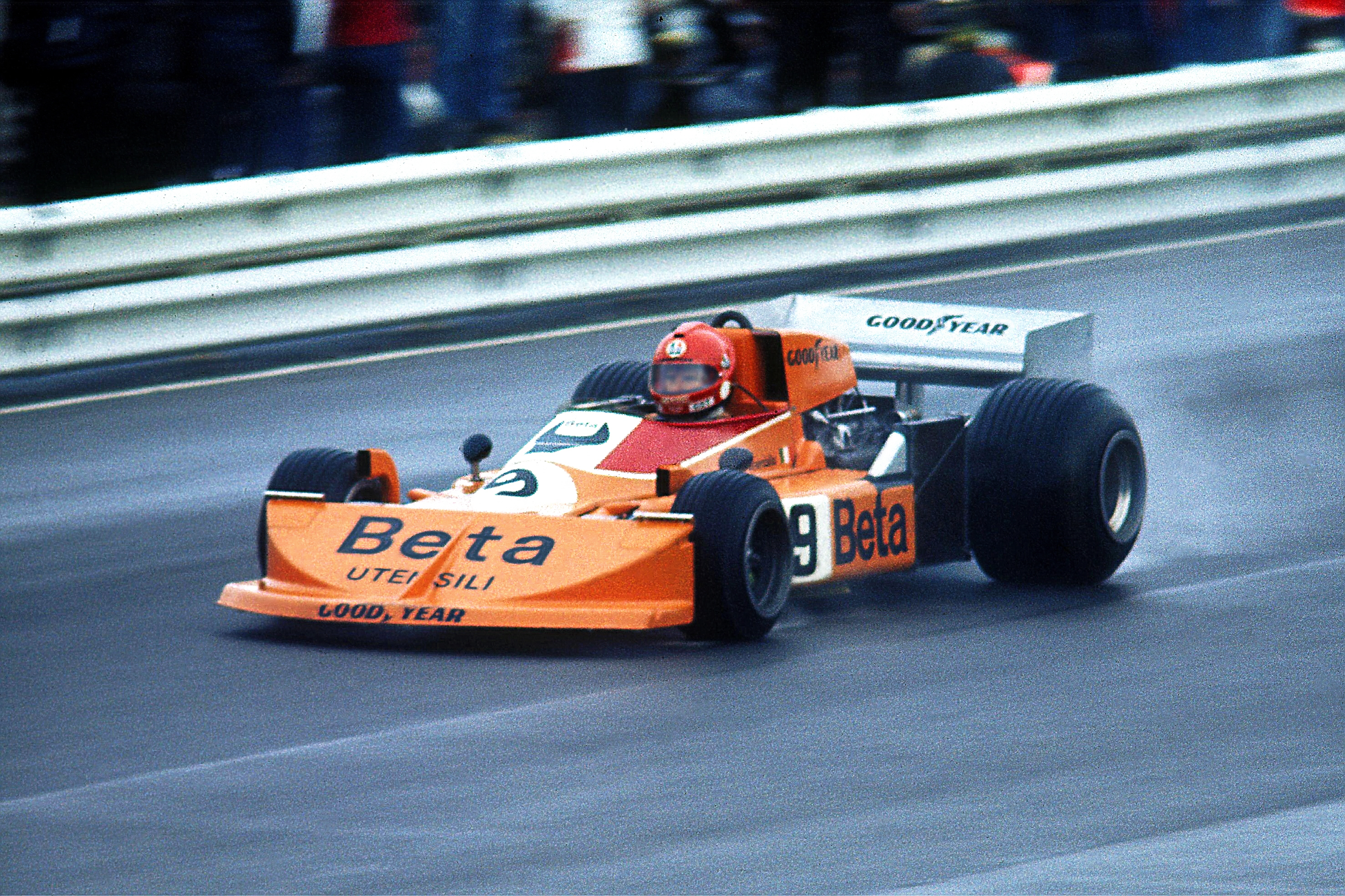
Vittorio Brambilla driving a March Ford 761

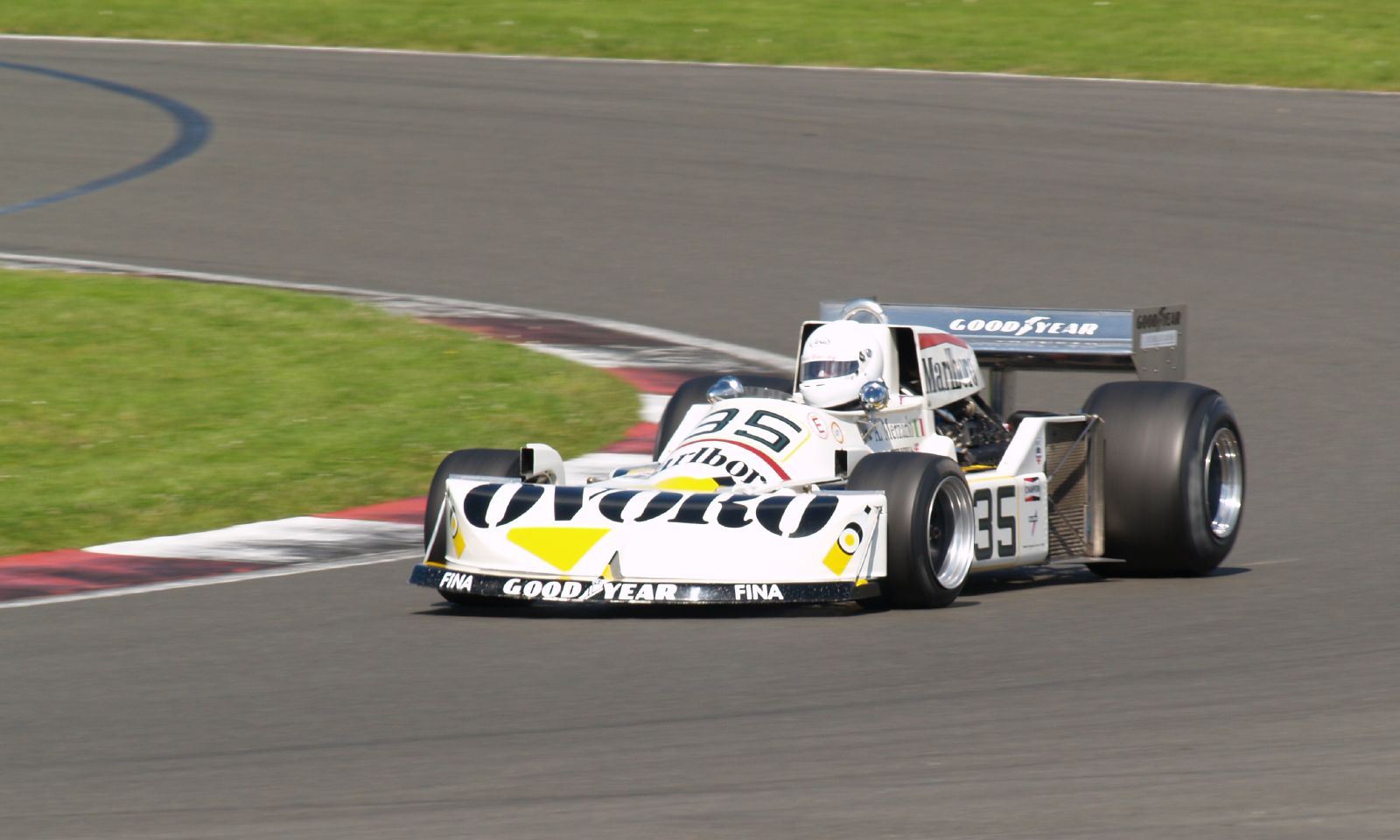
Arturo Merzario's 1976 March 761 being demonstrated in Silverstone

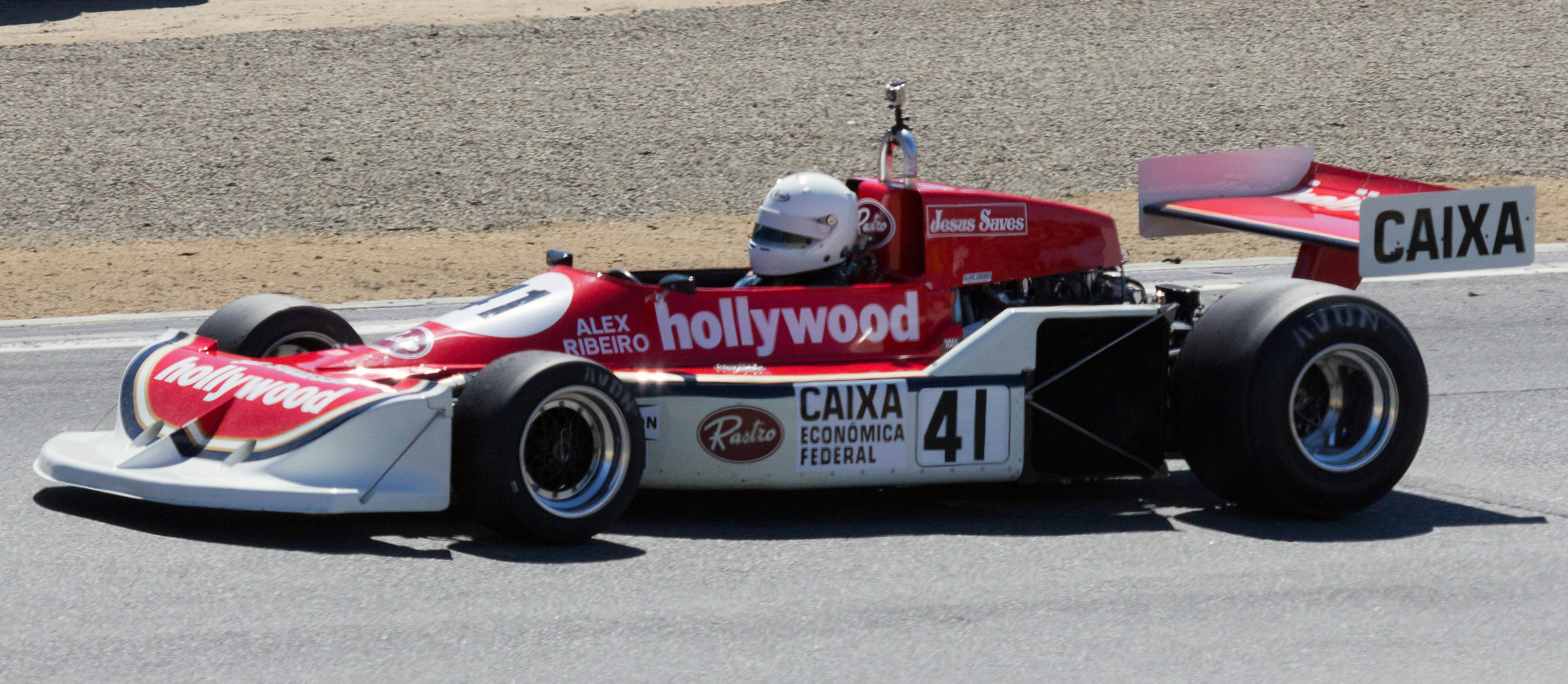
Alex Ribeiro's 1977 March 761 being demonstrated at Laguna Seca

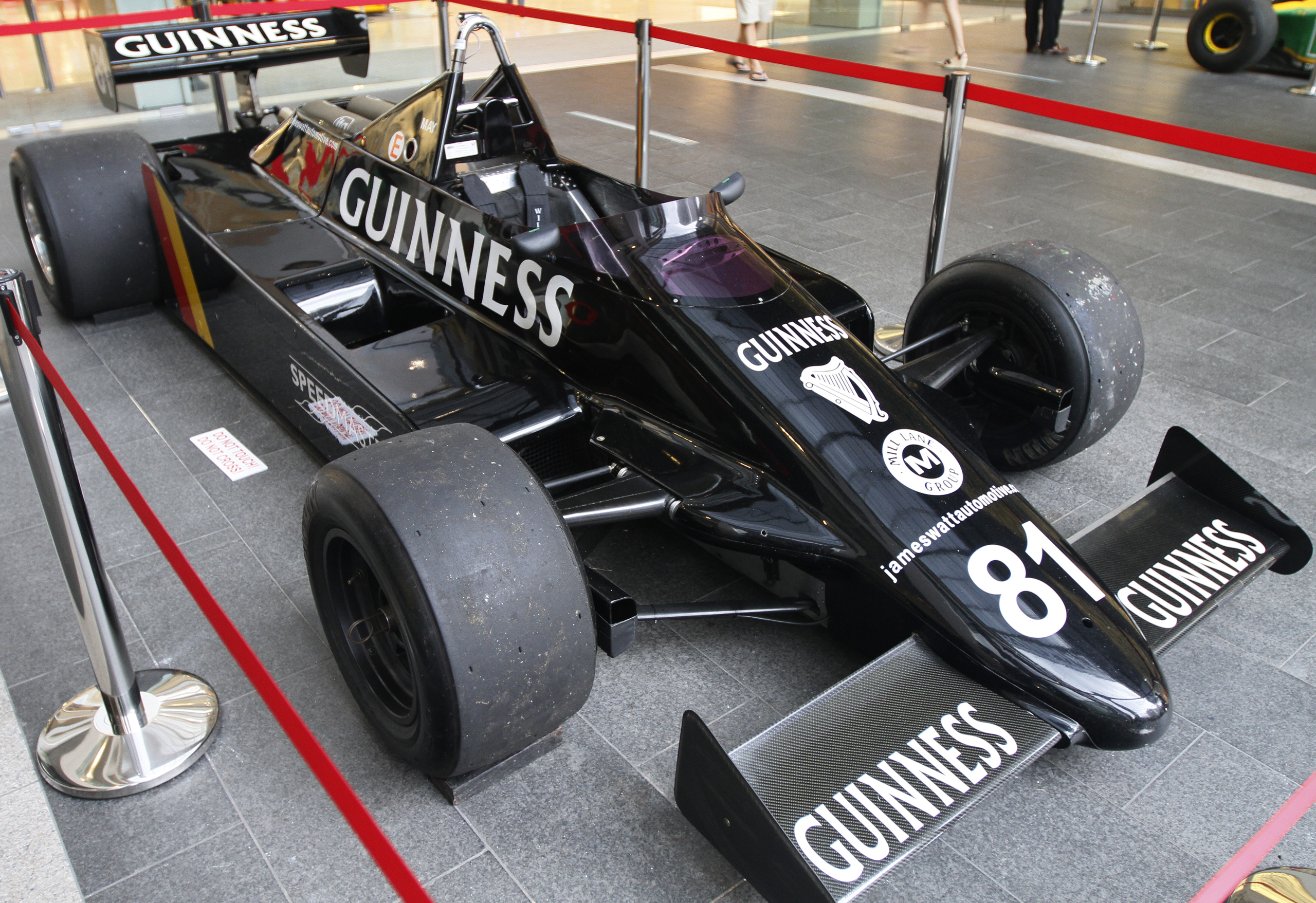
A March 811 from the 1981 season on display, notice the Guinness livery

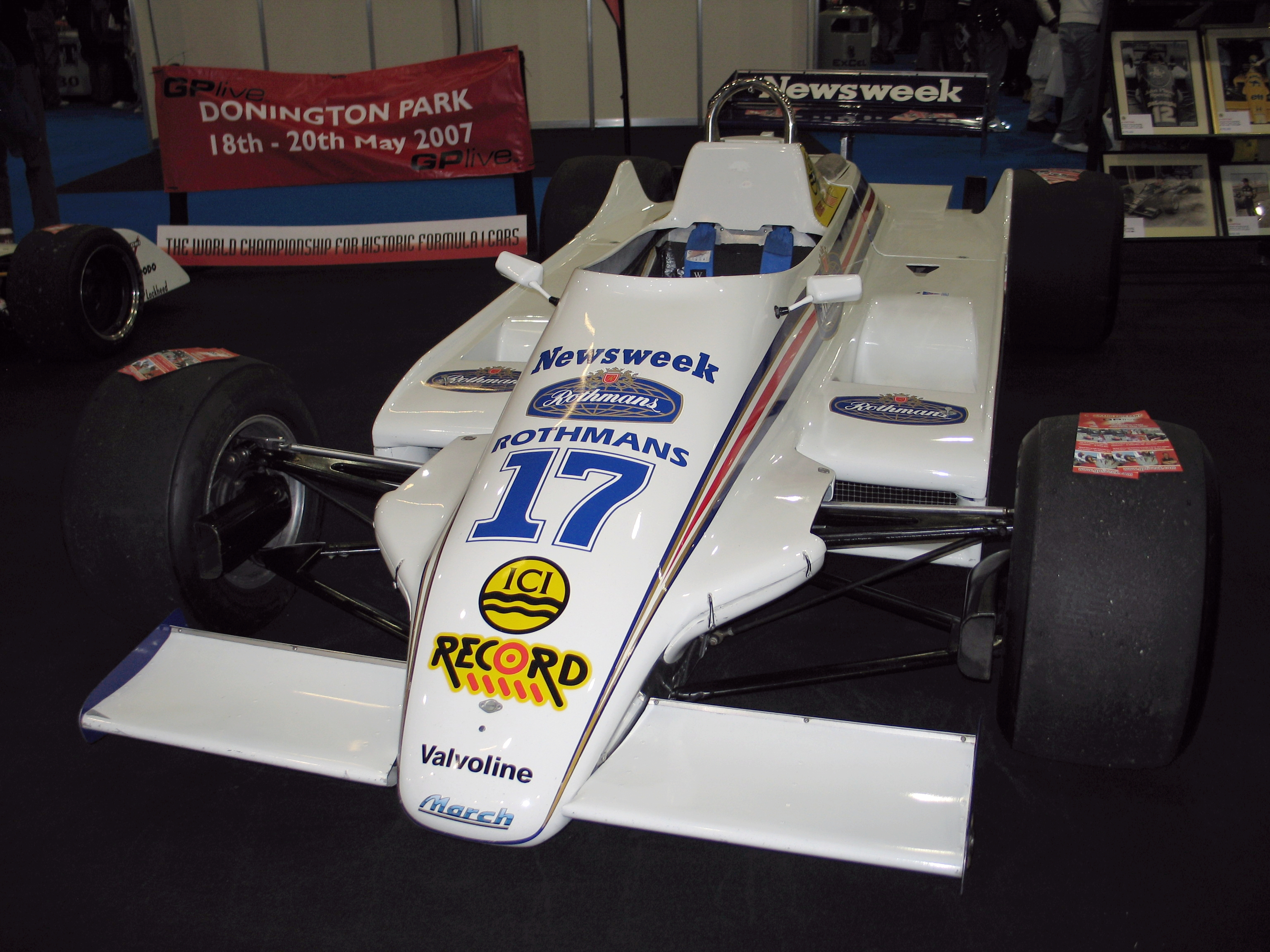
The March 821 from the 1982 season on display.

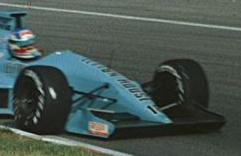
Ivan Capelli driving at the 1988 Canadian Grand Prix

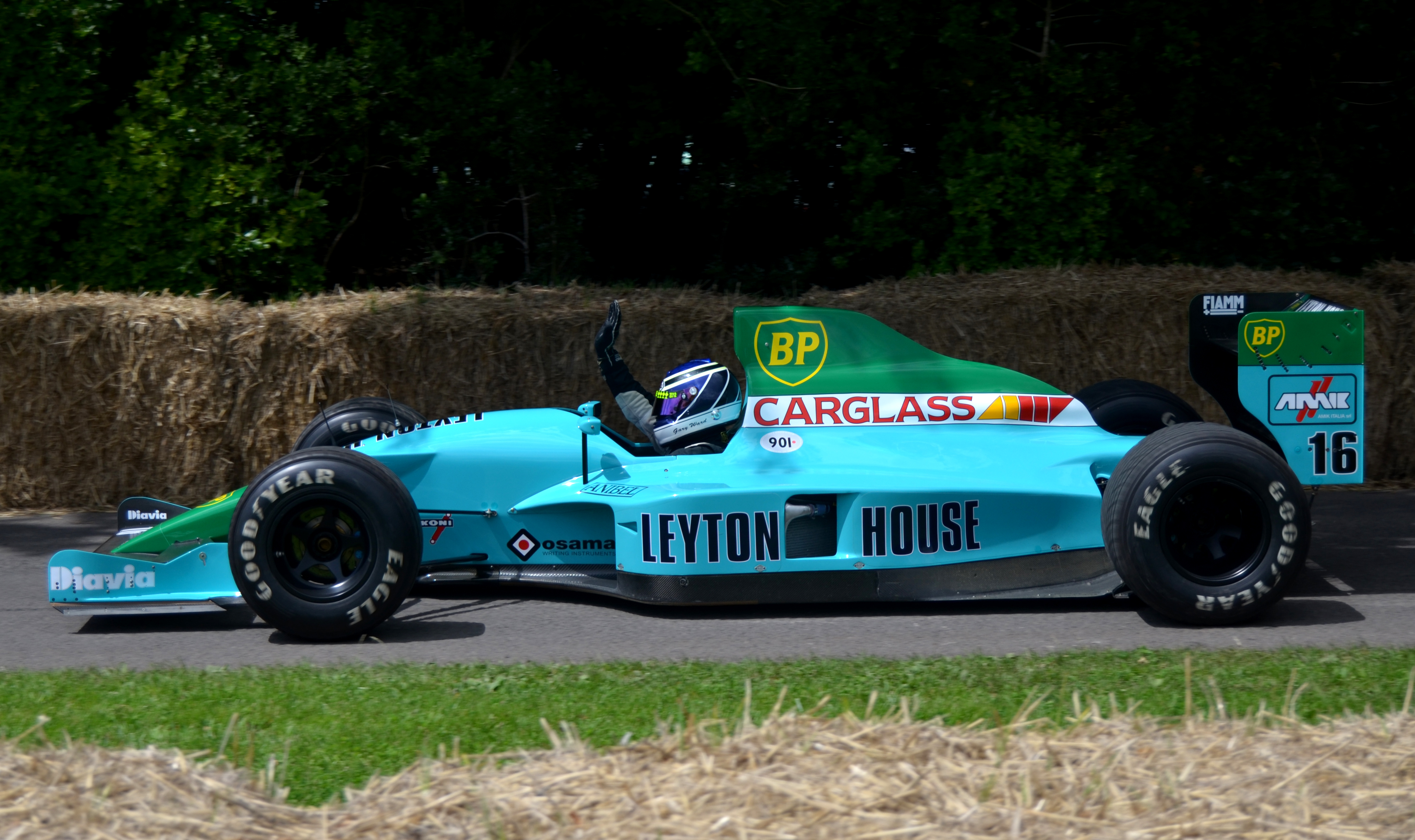
A 1990 Season Leyton House at the Goodwood Festival of Speed

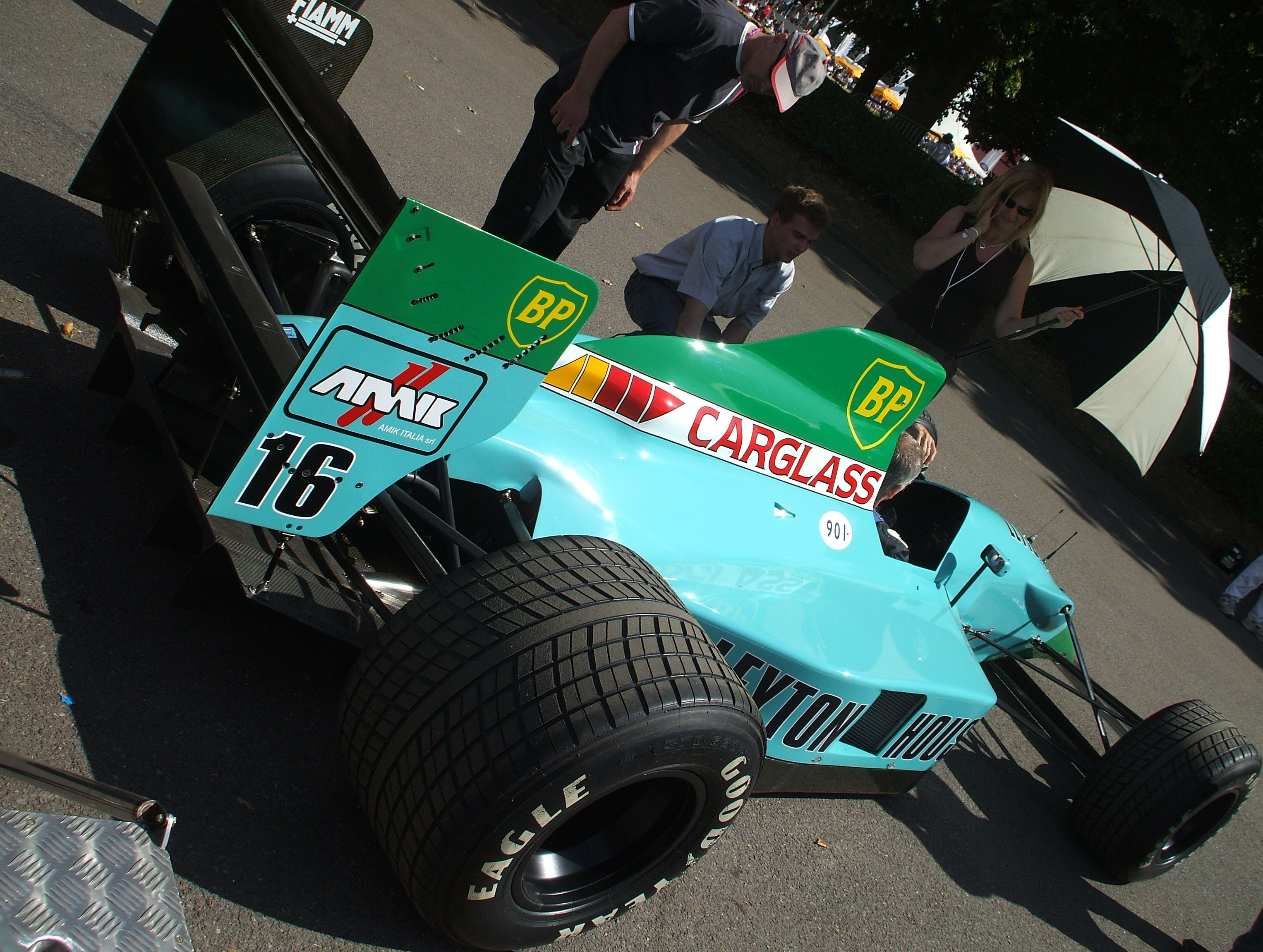
A Leyton House CG901. Leyton House in 1990 gained additional support from Autoglass.

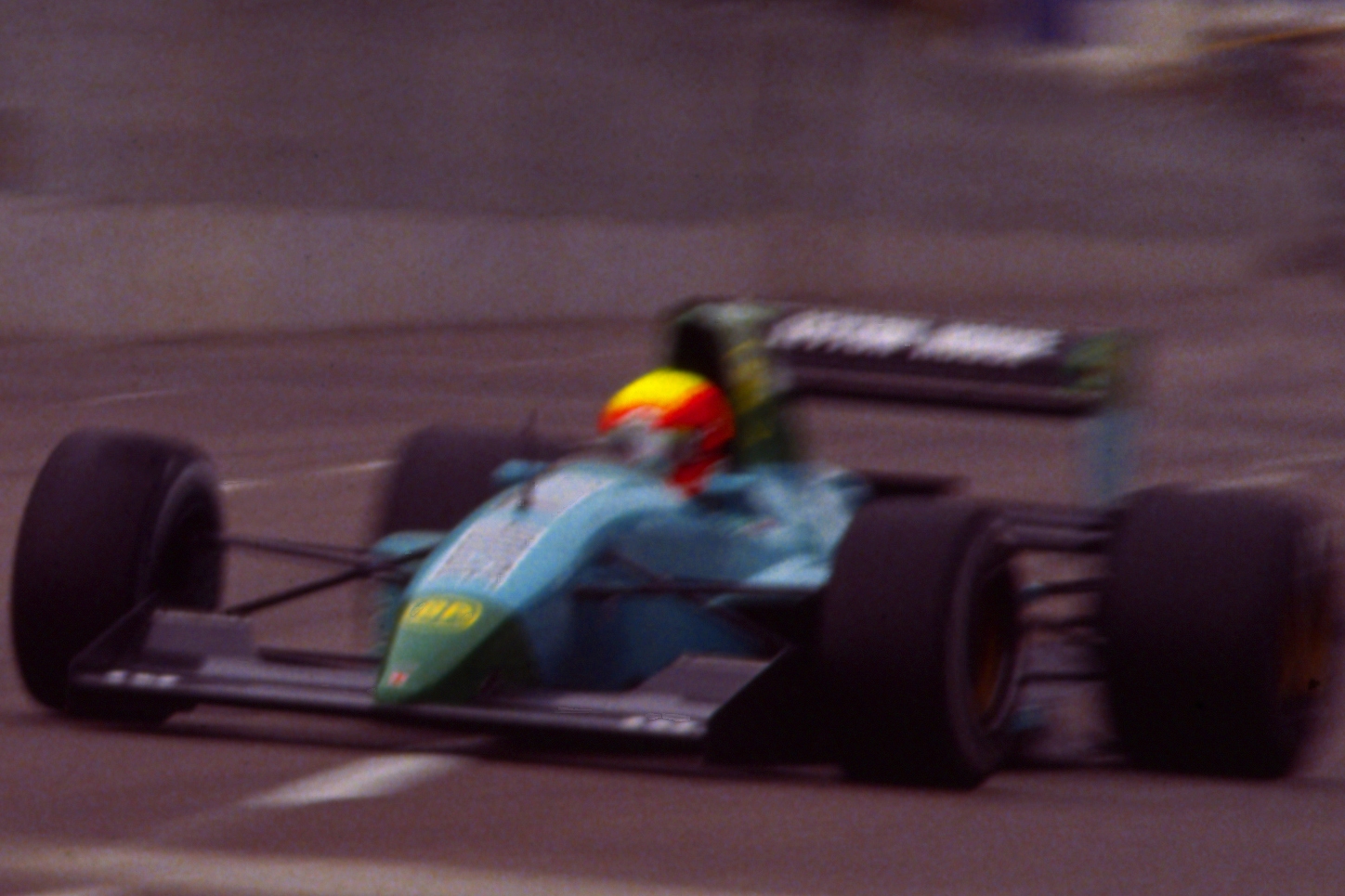
Maurício Gugelmin driving for Leyton House Racing at the 1991 United States Grand Prix.

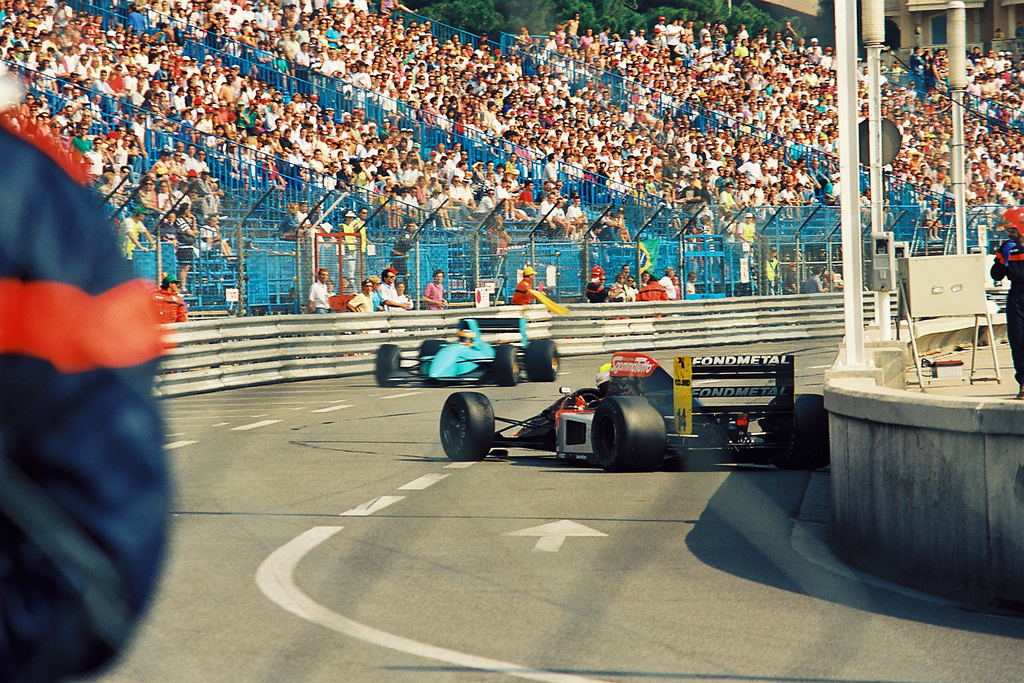
Karl Wendlinger racing for March at the 1992 Monaco Grand Prix.

== Marussia ==
Marussia entered Formula One in 2012 after Virgin Racing was renamed. The team was renamed as Manor in 2016.

Year	Main colour(s)	Additional colour(s)	Livery sponsor(s)	Additional major sponsor(s)
2012	Black, Red	White, Grey	Marussia Motors	Virgin, QNET, CNBC, CSC, LDC, Learndirect, Lagardère, IDEC, 24, Armin, Hello!, Pirelli
2013	Red, Black	White	Marussia Motors	QNET, LDC, A-GAS, Instaforex, PDVSA, Sage ERP X3, Antler, Bifold, Pirelli, RBK TV
2014	Red, Black	White	Marussia Motors	QNET, Sage ERP X3, Bifold, ROYALS, ARMIN STROM, Pirelli
2015	Red, White	Black, Blue	Flex-Box	Airbnb, Erreà, Pirelli, Coupons.com, Alaska Coffee Roasting, Shazam

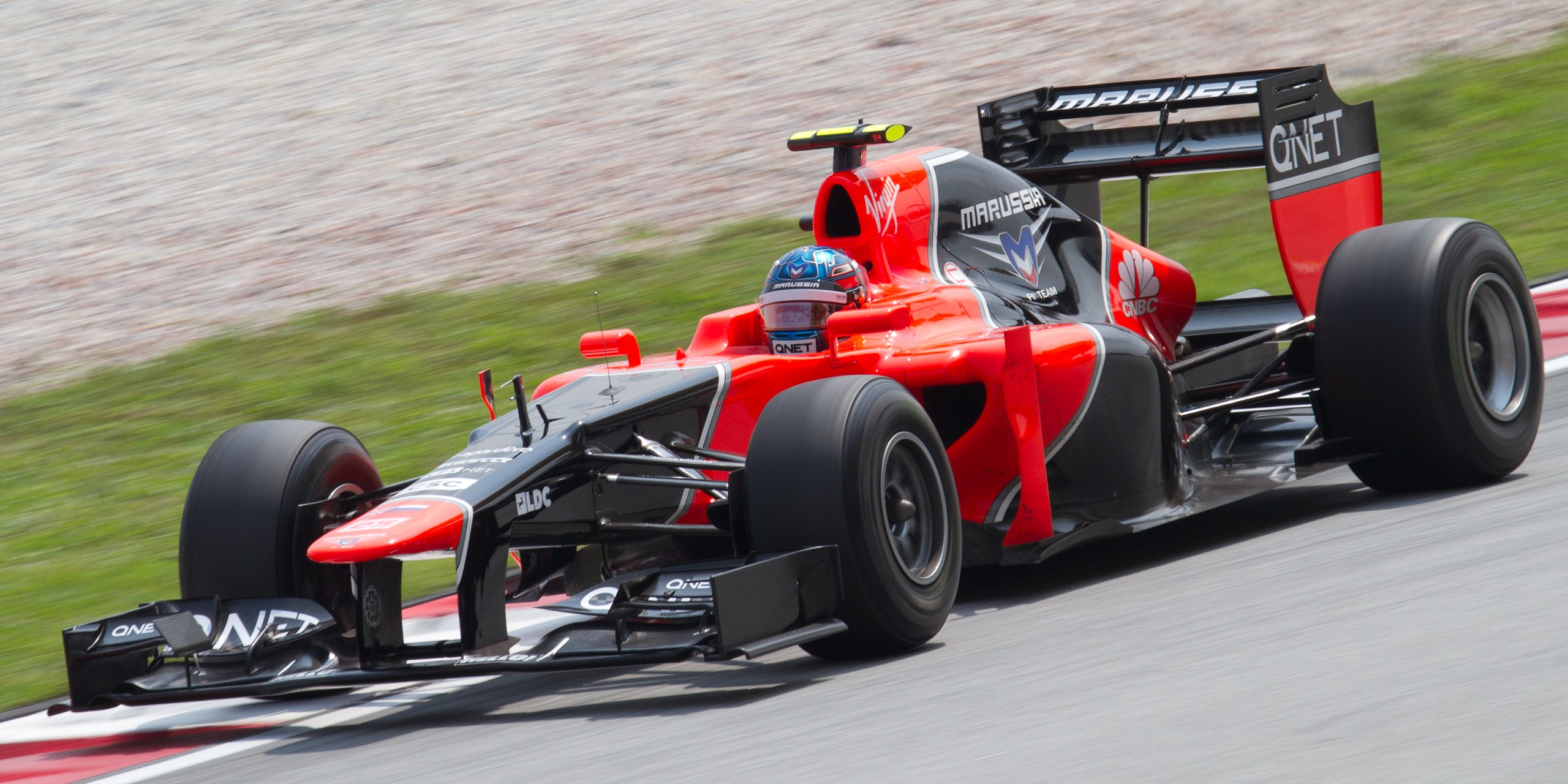
Charles Pic driving the Marussia MR01 during free practice at the 2012 Malaysian Grand Prix.

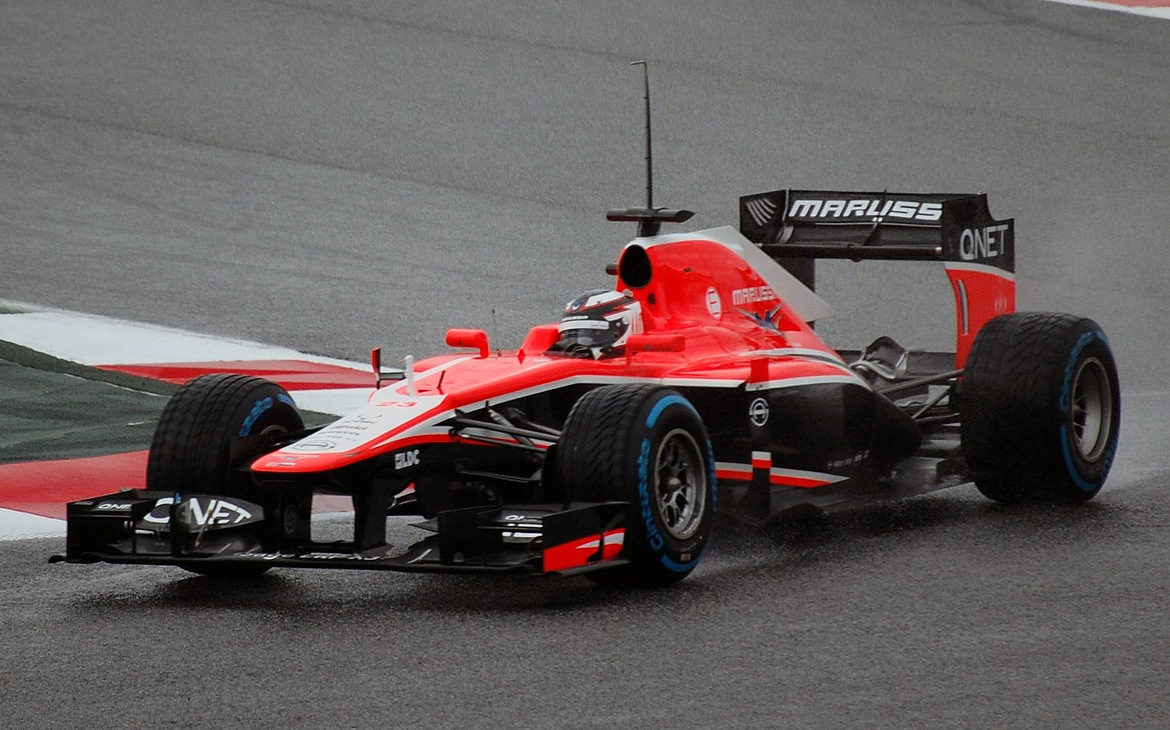
Max Chilton driving the Marussia MR02 in Montmelo (2013).

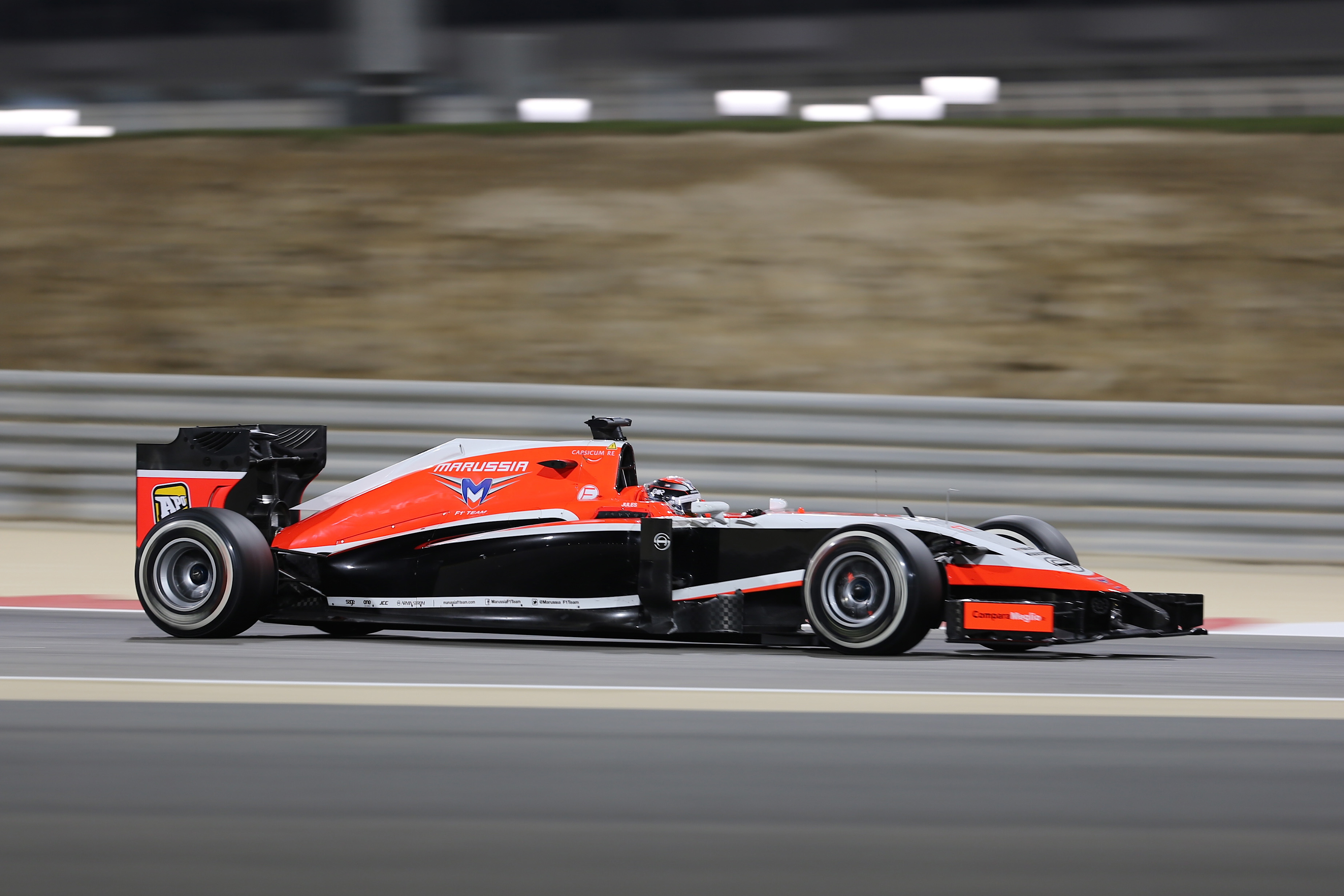
Jules Bianchi driving the Marussia MR03 at the 2014 Bahrain Grand Prix.

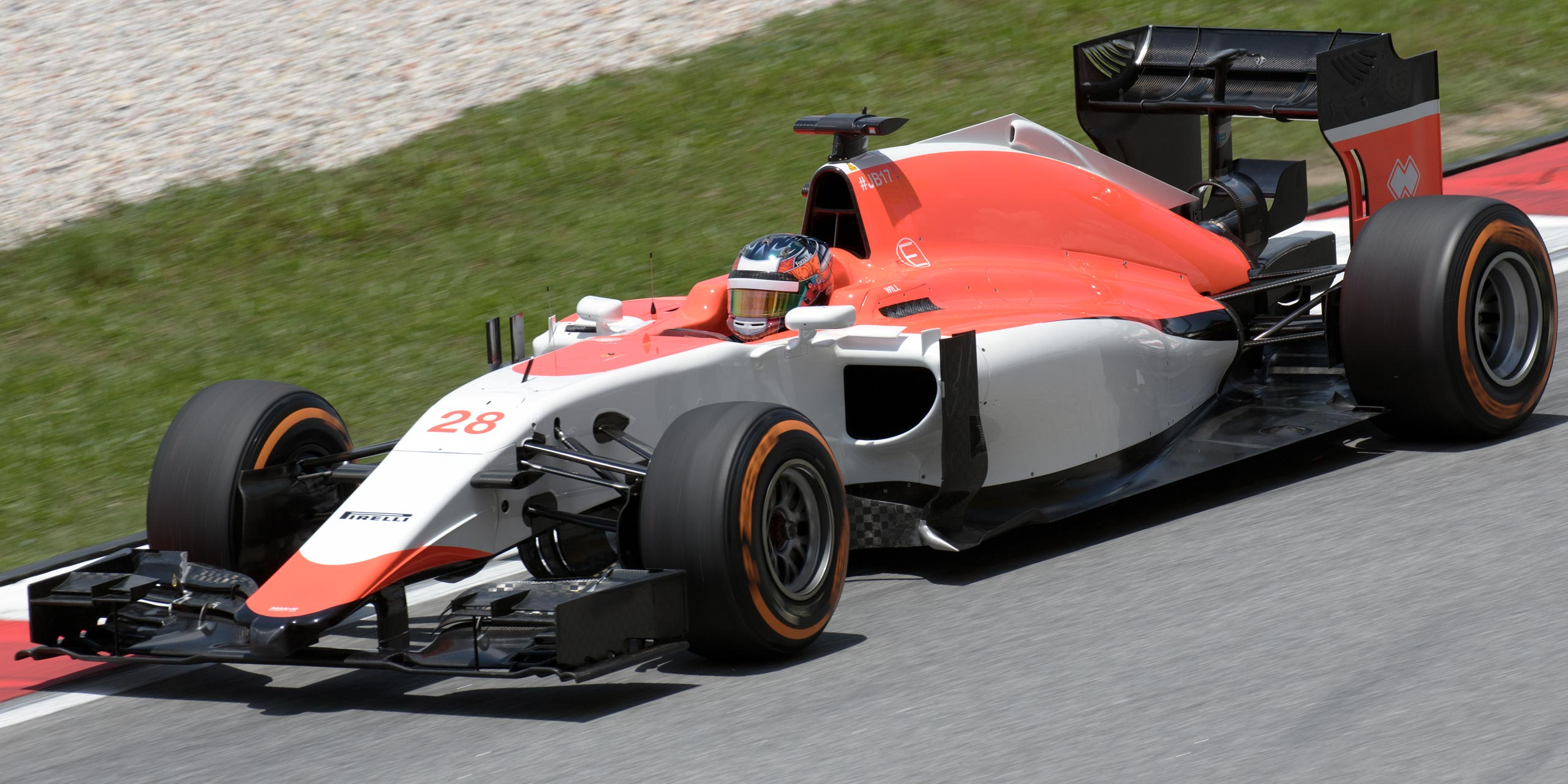
Will Stevens driving the Marussia MR03 at the 2015 Malaysian Grand Prix. The early-season car was devoid of sponsorship.

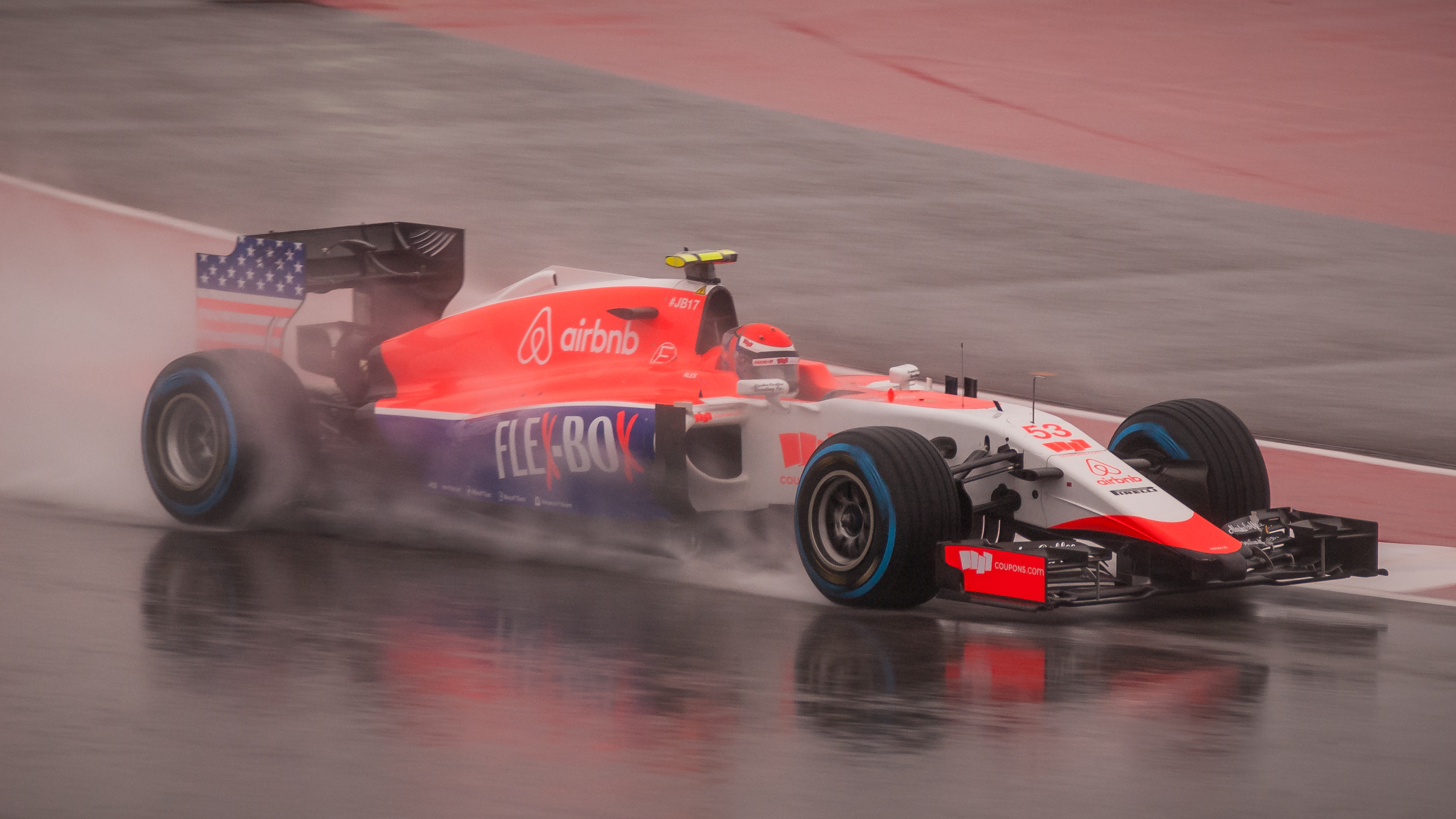
Alexander Rossi driving the Marussia MR03B at the 2015 United States Grand Prix.

== MasterCard Lola ==
Mastercard Lola folded after failing to qualify in the opening race.

Year	Main colour(s)	Additional colour(s)	Main sponsor(s)	Additional major sponsor(s)
1997	Blue	Red, White, Orange	MasterCard, Pennzoil	Lycra, Lola, Track & Field, Men's Health, Safra, CosmoGas, Bridgestone

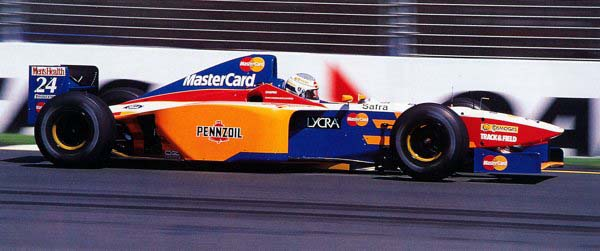
Vincenzo Sospiri attempting to qualify for the 1997 Australian Grand Prix.

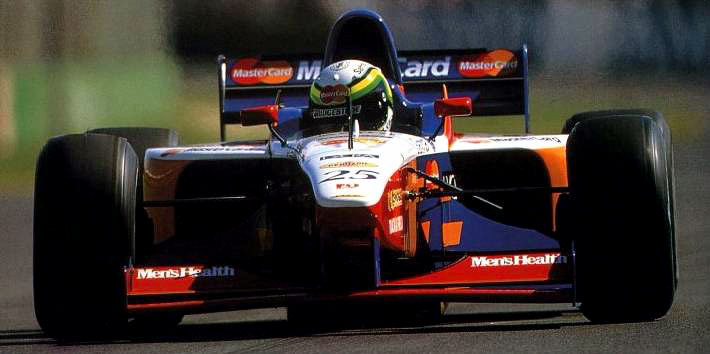
Ricardo Rosset attempting to qualify for the 1997 Australian Grand Prix.

== Matra ==
Except for the Matra MS9 car, entered by the British Ken Tyrrell's privateer team Matra International in the British racing green at the first race of the 1968 season (the 1968 South African Grand Prix), all Matra F1 cars entered by both the French works team Equipe Matra Sports (1967-1968 and 1970-1972) and the British privateer team Matra International (1968-1969) always kept the Bleu de France, the national racing colour of France.

Year	Main colour(s)	Additional colour(s)	Livery sponsor(s)	Additional major sponsor(s) / Notes
1968 (Matra MS9 car)	Green			Caltex
1968	Blue		Matra, Elf (Matra MS10 car)	A French, British and Scottish flag in honour of the constructor (Matra), team (Matra International) and driver (Jackie Stewart) respectively (Jackie Stewart's Matra MS10 car).
1969	Blue	White	Matra, Dunlop	Elf
1970–1972	Blue	Green and White (Pescarolo's car), White and Red (Beltoise's car)	Matra-Simca	Goodyear, Elf

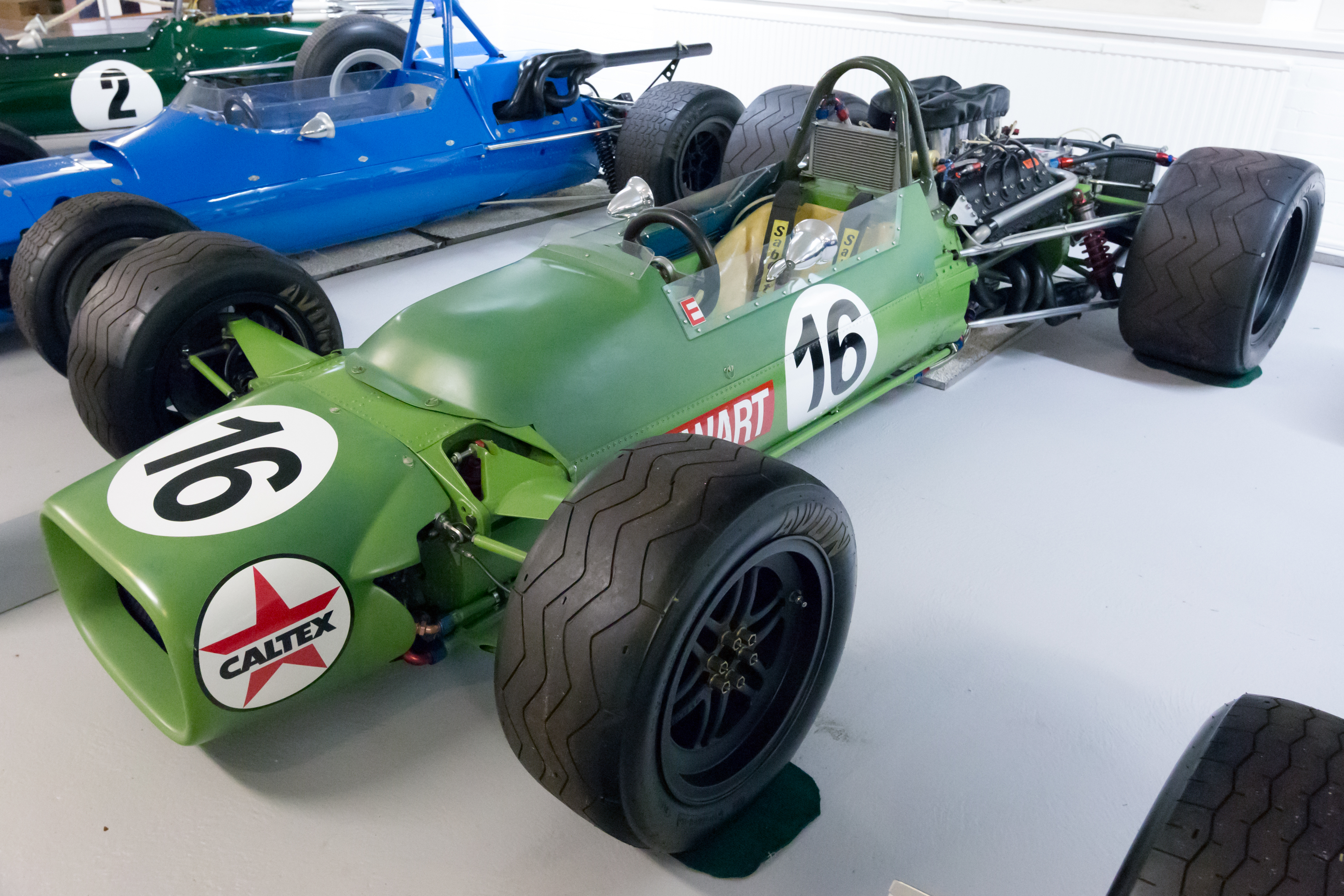
The Matra MS9 driven by Jackie Stewart in display

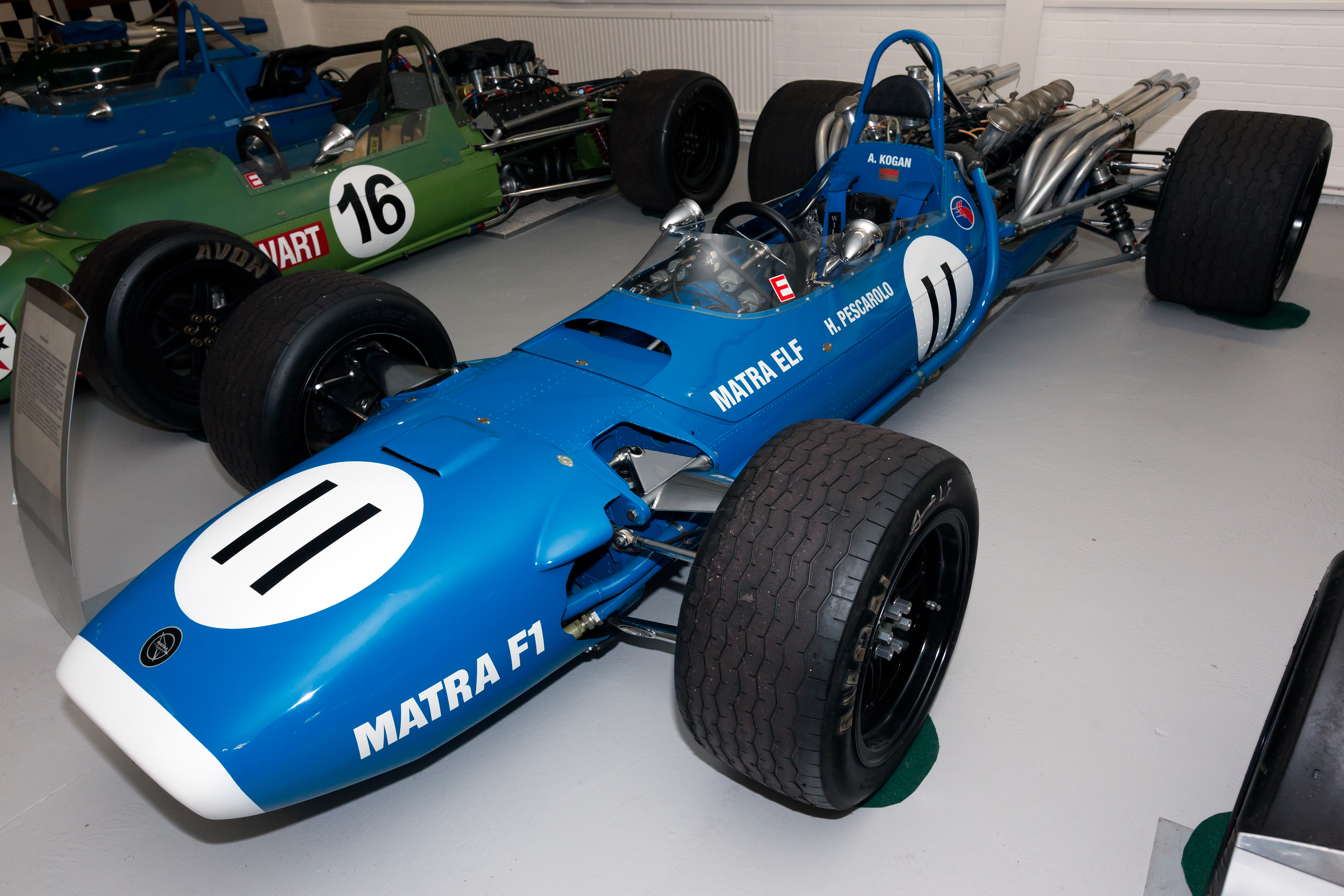
The Matra MS11 driven by Henri Pesarolo in display

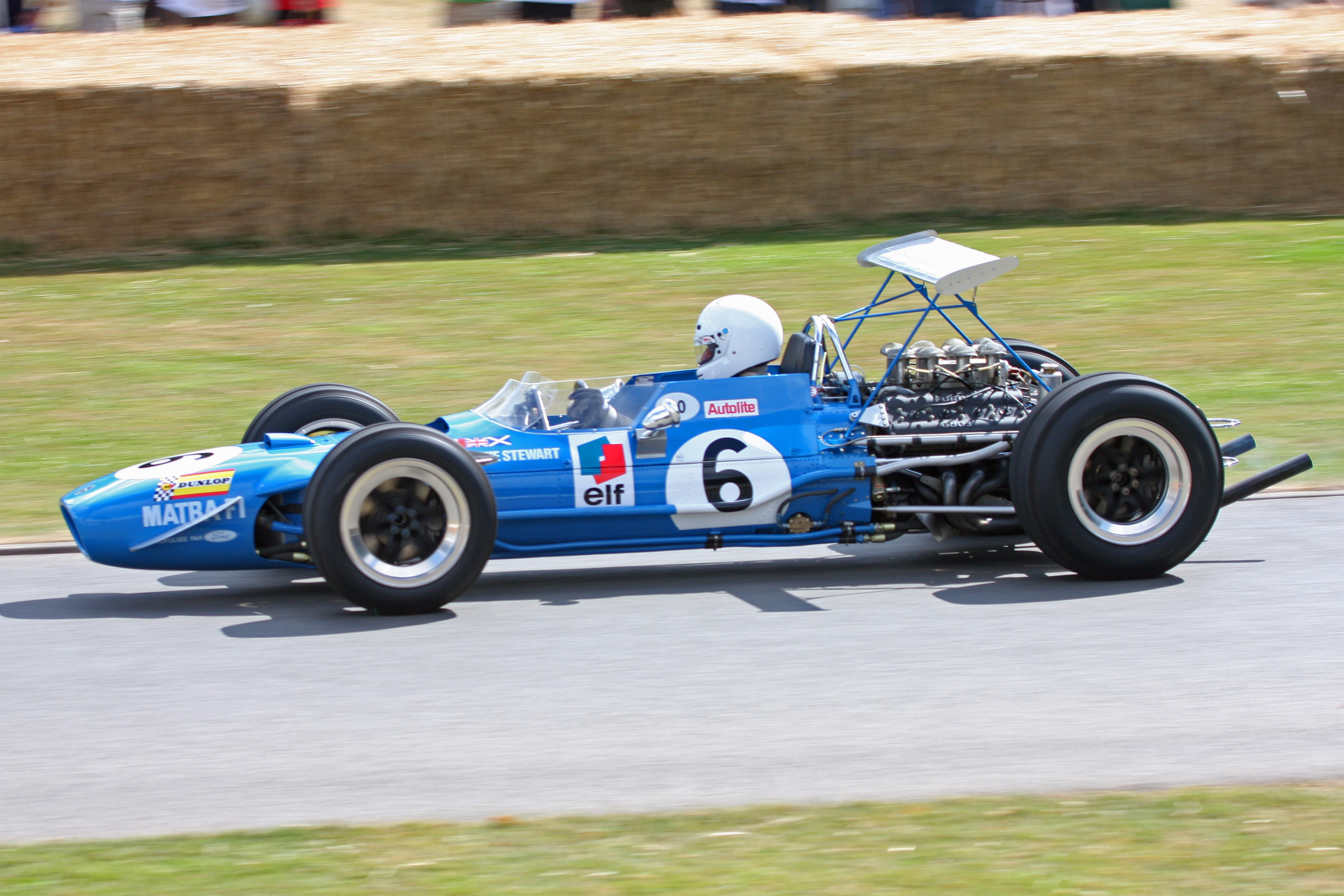
1968 Matra-Cosworth MS10

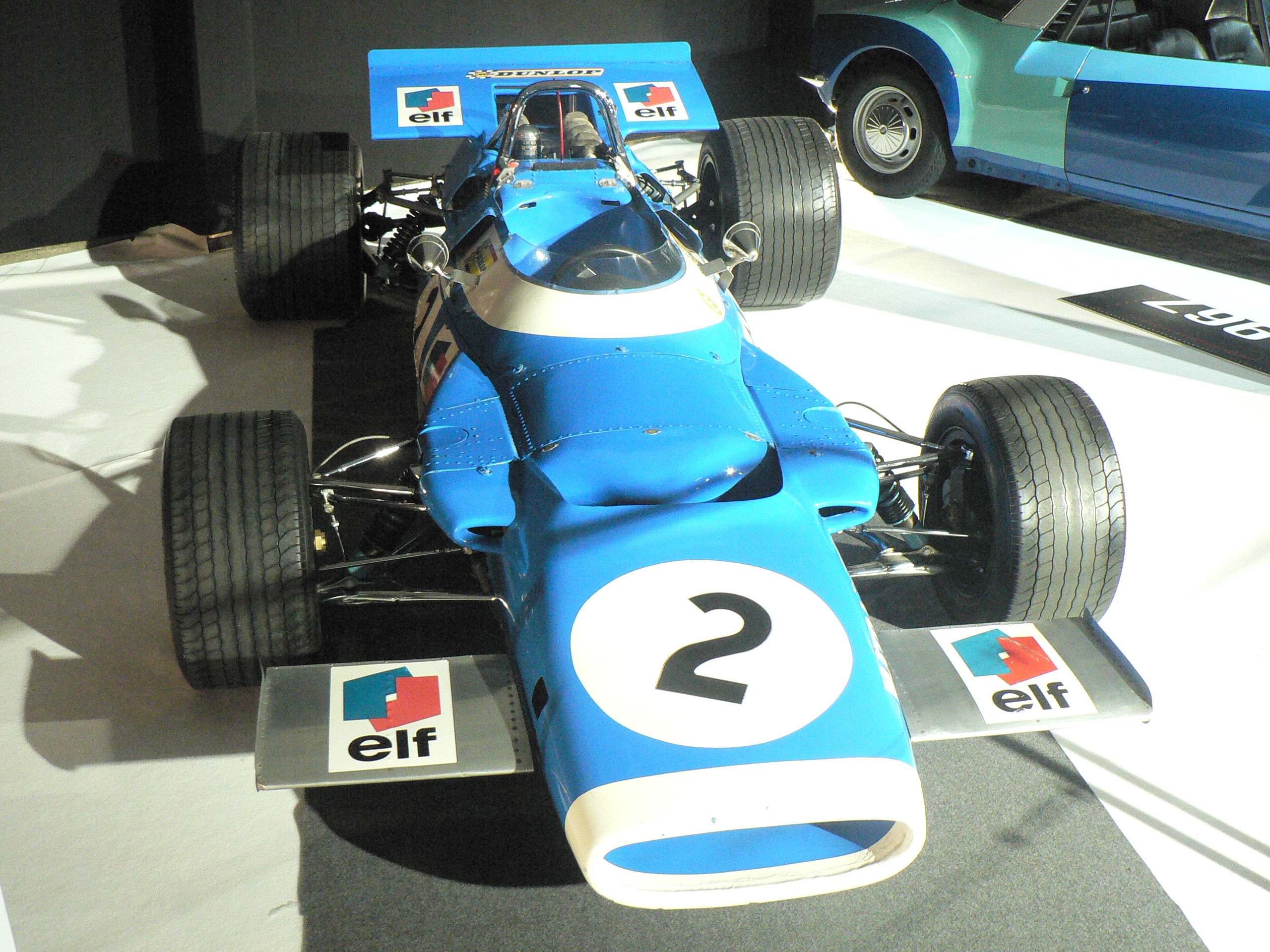
The Matra MS80 from the 1969 season.

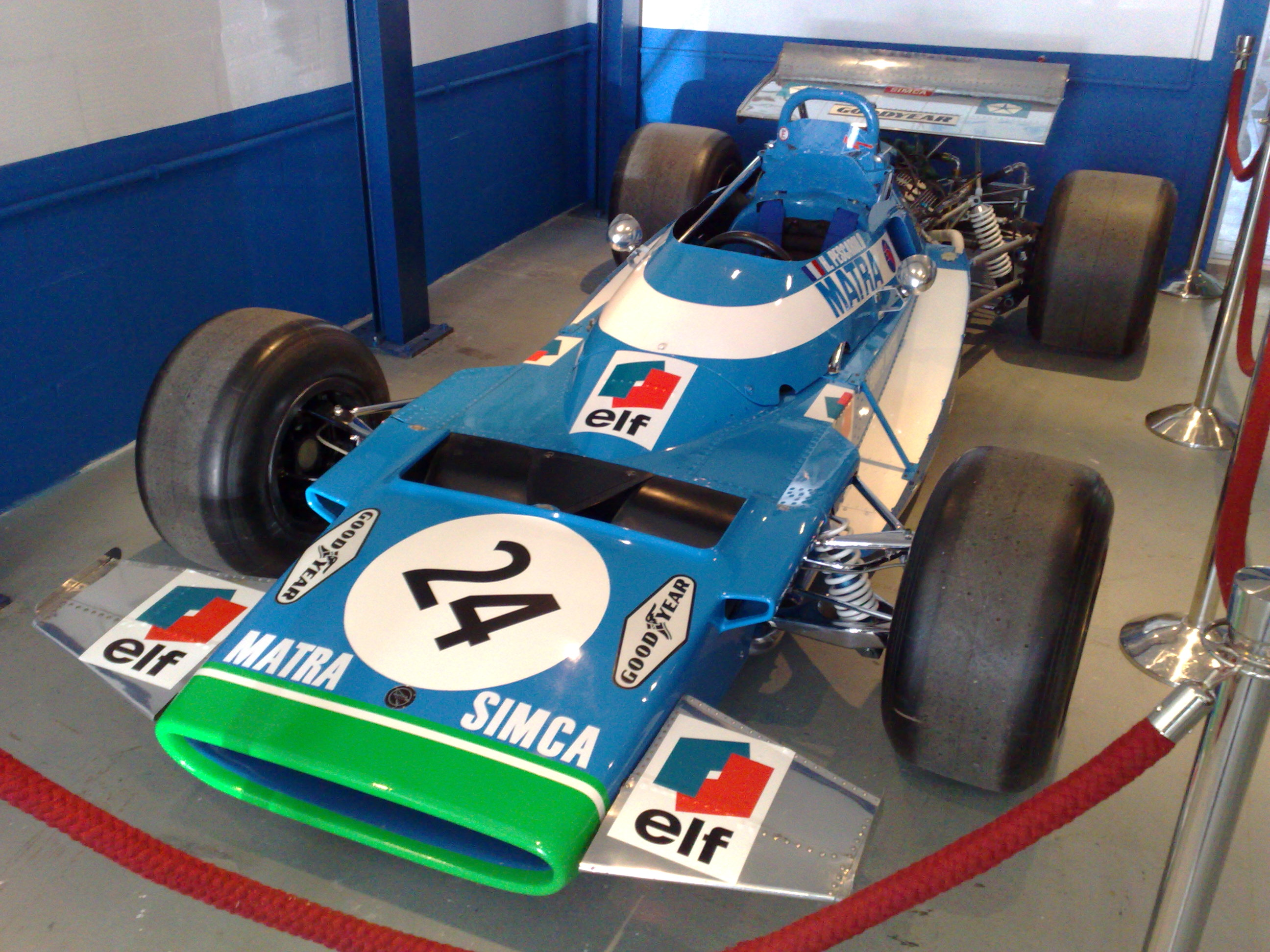
1970 Henri Pescarolo's Matra MS120 in display at a Matra workshop in Leerdam, The Netherlands.

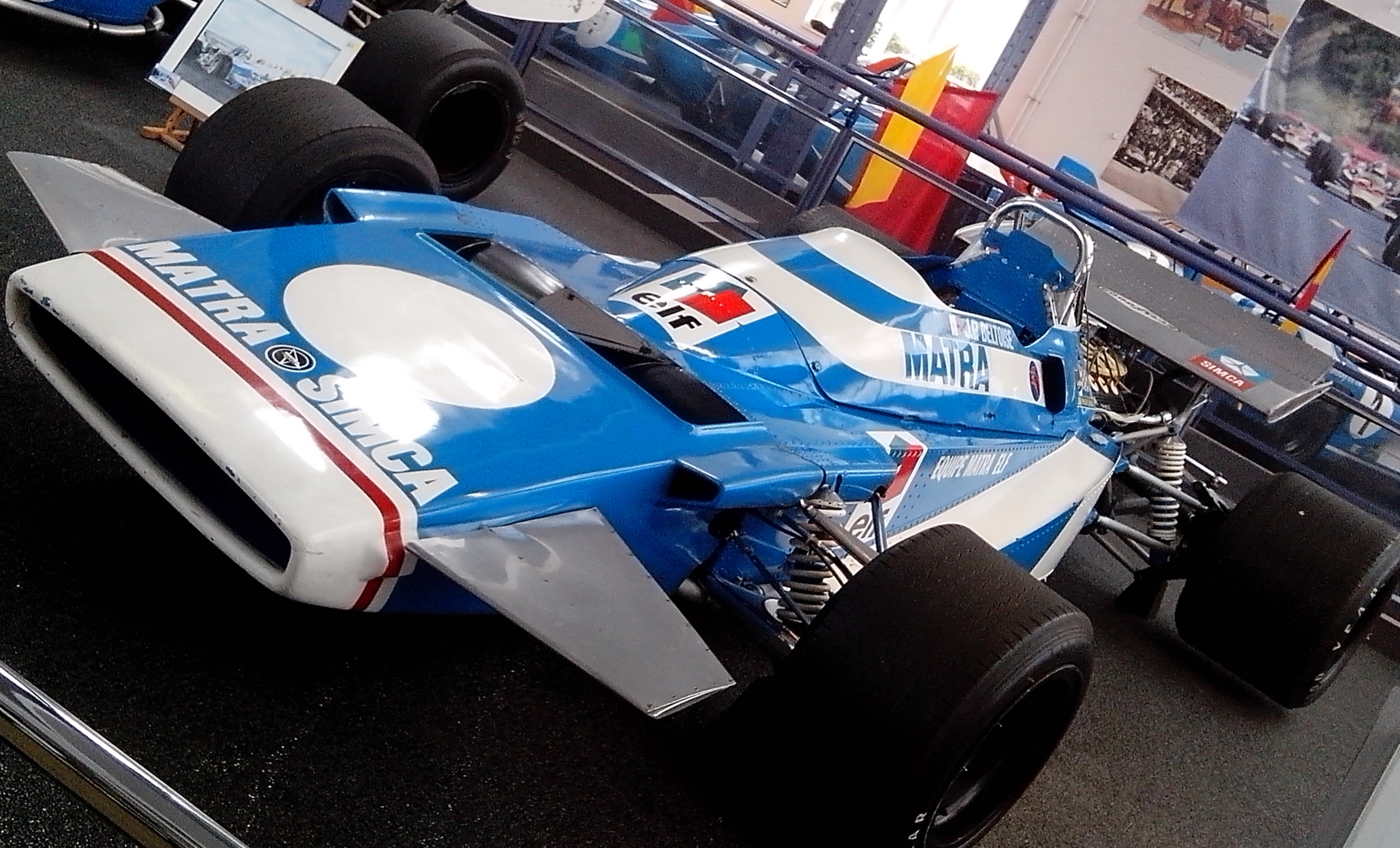
1970 Jean-Pierre Beltoise's Matra MS120.

== McLaren ==
McLaren's first Formula One car raced at the 1966 Monaco Grand Prix was painted white with a green stripe to represent a fictional Yamura team in John Frankenheimer's film Grand Prix. Though the team has been based and licensed in Britain, McLaren has never entered their cars in British racing green. Between 1968 and 1971, the team used an orange design, dubbed the papaya orange, which was also applied to their cars competing in the Indianapolis 500 and Can-Am. McLaren signed its first title sponsor in 1972 with Yardley London. From 1974 to 1996, McLaren and Marlboro had the longest title sponsorship deal in Formula One history which lasted for 23 consecutive seasons. McLaren then aligned with West (1997–2005) and Vodafone (2007–2013) as their title sponsor. Throughout those years, McLaren's livery colours reflected the colours of the title sponsors.

Since 2017, McLaren returned to using its traditional papaya orange colours, which was also used on their cars entered in other racing series such as Extreme E and Formula E. In 2021, the team, still without a title sponsor, received a special approval from the FIA to race a special one-off Gulf livery in collaboration with long time sponsor Gulf Oil for the Monaco Grand Prix. This then began a trend of special one-off liveries in Formula One.

Year	Main colour(s)	Additional colour(s)	Livery/Principal sponsor(s)	Additional major sponsor(s)	Notes
1966	White, Dark Green				
1967	Red, Silver				McLaren raced a red livery for the Monaco and Italian Grands Prix and a silver and orange livery for the United States Grand Prix.
1968–1972	Yellow, Orange	White		Goodyear, Reynolds Aluminium, Autolite, Gulf, BP, Sasol	
1972–1974	White	Black and Orange	Yardley	Goodyear, Heuer, Champion, Gulf, Texaco, Lockheed	
1974–1996	White	Red, Blue (1978–1979), Gold (1978–1979)	Marlboro, Löwenbräu (1978–1979)	TAG Group (1983–1996), Texaco (1974–1979), Castrol (1980), Unipart (1981–1983), Valvoline (1981), Shell (1984–1994), Mobil 1 (1995–1996), Hugo Boss (1984–1996), Honda (1988–1992), Saima Avandero (1984–1986), Showa (1988–1991), Tencel (1995), Kmart (1993), Courtaulds (1989–1995), Goodyear (1974–1980, 1985–1996), Michelin (1981–1984), Hercules (1981–1987), Ford (1993), Peugeot (1994), Mercedes-Benz (1995–1996), Sun Microsystems (1994-1996) Loctite (1995–1996), Camozzi (1991–1996), ABAC Air Compressors (1994-1995), Cisco Systems (1994-1996), Champion (1978–1979)	Marlboro was replaced by a chevron (1974), barcode (1984–1985, 1987–1992) or with the McLaren brand (1986, 1991–1993). At the 1978 United States Grand Prix, 1978 Canadian Grand Prix and 1979 Long Beach Grand Prix, McLaren raced a Löwenbräu livery to promote the brand. At the 1986 Portuguese Grand Prix, Keke Rosberg's car was painted yellow and white rather than red and white to advertise Marlboro Lights.
1997–2005	Black	Silver	West	Mercedes-Benz, Mobil, Siemens (2004–2005), Mobil 1, CA, Inc. (1997–2002), Hugo Boss, SAP (1997, 2001–2005), Schüco, Loctite (1997–2003), Michelin (2002-2005),Sonax (2003), Sun Microsystems, Henkel (2004–2005), Siemens Mobile (2001–2004), Warsteiner (1998–2002), Camozzi (1997–1998), AT&T (2004-2005), Hilton Hotels & Resorts (2005), Johnnie Walker (2005), Goodyear (1997), Bridgestone (1998–2001), Fujitsu Siemens (1999–2000)	"West" was removed or replaced with West logo (1997–1999), with driver's first names and "Team" (on team members clothing) (1999–2004) or driver's full name and "Team McLaren" (on team members clothing) (2005).
2006	Chrome	Black, Red		Mercedes-Benz, Mobil, Johnnie Walker, Siemens, AT&T, Hugo Boss, SAP, Mobil 1, Schüco, Henkel, Hilton, Emirates	Johnnie Walker logos were either removed, or replaced by "Keep Walking" logos or Diageo's logo in Turkey, for races in Muslim countries which forbid alcohol advertising. They are still absent in those countries.
2007–2013	Chrome	Red	Vodafone	Mercedes-Benz, Mobil 1, Johnnie Walker (2007–2011), Kenwood Corporation (2007), Aigo (2007–2011), Santander (2007–2009), Hugo Boss, Bridgestone (2007–2010), SAP (2007–2009), Xtb (2010), AkzoNobel (2011-2013), Pirelli (2011–2013), Lucozade (2012–2013), Maximuscle (2012), Tooned (2012–2013), Claro (2013)	In the 2011 Canadian Grand Prix, because of Vodafone's 45% stake in Verizon Wireless and the lack of other North American business operations, there is a co-branding of Vodafone and Verizon. In the 2012 United States Grand Prix, the Vodafone branding is replaced with Verizon Wireless (then a joint venture of Verizon and Vodafone). Vodafone partners replaced the brand in the 2013 Bahrain and United States Grands Prix. Zain was used in Bahrain whereas Verizon was used in Austin.
2014	Chrome	Black		Mercedes-Benz, Mobil 1, Hugo Boss, TAG Heuer, SAP, Pirelli, Johnnie Walker, Esso, ASOS.com, AkzoNobel	
2015	Chrome, Black (Australia to Bahrain)	Red		Honda, Johnnie Walker, Mobil 1, Pirelli, SAP, CNN, TAG Heuer, Hilton, Segafredo, KPMG, Esso	
2015	Dark Grey (Spain to Abu Dhabi)	Red		Honda, Johnnie Walker, Mobil 1, Pirelli, SAP, CNN, TAG Heuer, Hilton, Segafredo, KPMG, Esso	
2016	Dark Grey	Red		Honda, Johnnie Walker, Mobil, Mobil 1, Pirelli, SAP, CNN, Hilton, Segafredo, KPMG, Exxon, Esso, Richard Mille, Sensodyne, NRF, NTT Communications, Michael Kors, Chandon	Chandon replaced by stars (Bahrain), or removed (Abu Dhabi).
2017	Orange, Black	White		Honda, Johnnie Walker, Castrol, Pirelli, SAP, CNN, Richard Mille, NTT Communications, Michael Kors, Hilton, NRF, Logitech, Chandon, World's Fastest Gamer	Chandon replaced by stars or McLaren wordmark (Rear wing), Johnnie Walker removed.
2018	Orange	Blue, Black		Renault, Dell Technologies, NTT Communications, Petrobras, Petrobras Lubrax, Logitech, Airgain, Pirelli, SAP, Richard Mille, Kimoa, Hilton, NRF, CNBC, Coca-Cola, McLaren Shadow, Logitech, FxPro, Chandon	A one-off livery was applied to Fernando Alonso's car for the 2018 Abu Dhabi Grand Prix, which was his final race with the team. It featured the colours of his helmet.
2019	Orange	Blue, Black		Renault, A Better Tomorrow, Estrella Galicia, Petrobras, Petrobras Lubrax, Pirelli, SAP, McLaren Shadow, CNBC, Huski Chocolate, Richard Mille, FxPro, Hilton, Coca-Cola, Arrow Electronics, Logitech, Dell Technologies, AutoNation, ScanSource, Mission Foods, Automation Anywhere, KAUST	A Better Tomorrow is used to advertise British American Tobacco's smokeless product brands Vuse (previously Vype) and Velo (previously Lyft). The advertising space is either sold by BAT or replaced with BAT-affiliated partners in countries where BAT do not sell Vuse or Velo, or in countries that ban tobacco-related advertising. In countries where cryptocurrency- and gambling-related advertising are banned, the sponsors are replaced with existing sponsors or alternatively named. Since 2021, McLaren has raced special liveries in collaboration with their sponsors as well as to commemorate significant milestones and events. The first special livery raced was the Gulf livery for the 2021 Monaco Grand Prix.
2020–2021	Orange	Blue, Black	A Better Tomorrow	Renault (2020), Estrella Galicia (2020), Automation Anywhere (2020), Pirelli, McLaren Shadow, CNBC, Huski Chocolate, Richard Mille, FxPro, Hilton, Arrow Electronics, Dell Technologies, Darktrace, Tumi, Klipsch, Splunk, Coca-Cola, Buzz & Co, FAI Aviation Group, KAUST, Logitech, Mission Foods (2020), Gulf Oil, Miory Steel, Cisco Webex (2021), Bitci.com (2021), QNTMPAY (2021), PartyCasino/PartyPoker (2021), Alteryx (2021), Tezos (2021), DeWalt (2021), EasyPost (2021), Medallia (2021), Smartsheet (2021), DataRobot (2021), McLaren Artura (2021)	
2022–2023	Orange	Blue, Black	A Better Tomorrow	Pirelli, CNBC, Richard Mille, Hilton, Arrow Electronics, Medallia, Tezos, Alteryx, Smartsheet, Cisco Webex, Cisco (2023), Gulf Oil (2022), Dell Technologies, DeWalt, DataRobot (2022), Gopuff, KAUST, FAI Aviation Group, FxPro, Splunk, Darktrace, PartyCasino/PartyPoker, EasyPost, Immersivelab, Logitech, McLaren Artura (2022), Android, Google Chrome, OKX, Cadence, Goldman Sachs, VMware, DP World (2023), Jack Daniel's (2023), Castore (2023), HaloITSM (2023), NTT Data (2023)	
2024–2026	Orange, Black	Dark blue, Teal blue (2025), Dark green (2026)	OKX, Google Chrome (2024–2025), Google Gemini (2025–2026), Mastercard	A Better Tomorrow, Pirelli, Cisco, Cisco Webex, DP World, CNBC (2024), Richard Mille, Hilton, Alteryx (2024), Dell Technologies, DeWalt, FxPro, Darktrace (2024), Cadence (2024), Goldman Sachs (2024), Jack Daniel's, NTT Data (2024), Gopuff (2024), Arrow Electronics, KAUST (2024–2025), FAI Aviation Group (2024–2025), VMware (2024), Estrella Galicia (2024), HaloITSM (2024–2025), Workday, Dropbox, Airwallex, eBay (2025), Monster Energy (2024), Castore (2024), Ecolab, Optimum Nutrition (2024–2025), Allwyn/Avenga (2025–2026), Okta (2025–2026), Greene Tweed (2025–2026), New Era (2025), Freshworks (2025–2026), Medallia (2025), Trend Micro (2025), Groq (2025–2026), Iron Mountain (2025–2026), Rubrik (2026), Deloitte (2026), ONEflight International (2026), Hedera (2026), Puma (2026), Etihad (2026), Intel (2026), P&G (2026), AbbVie (2026)	

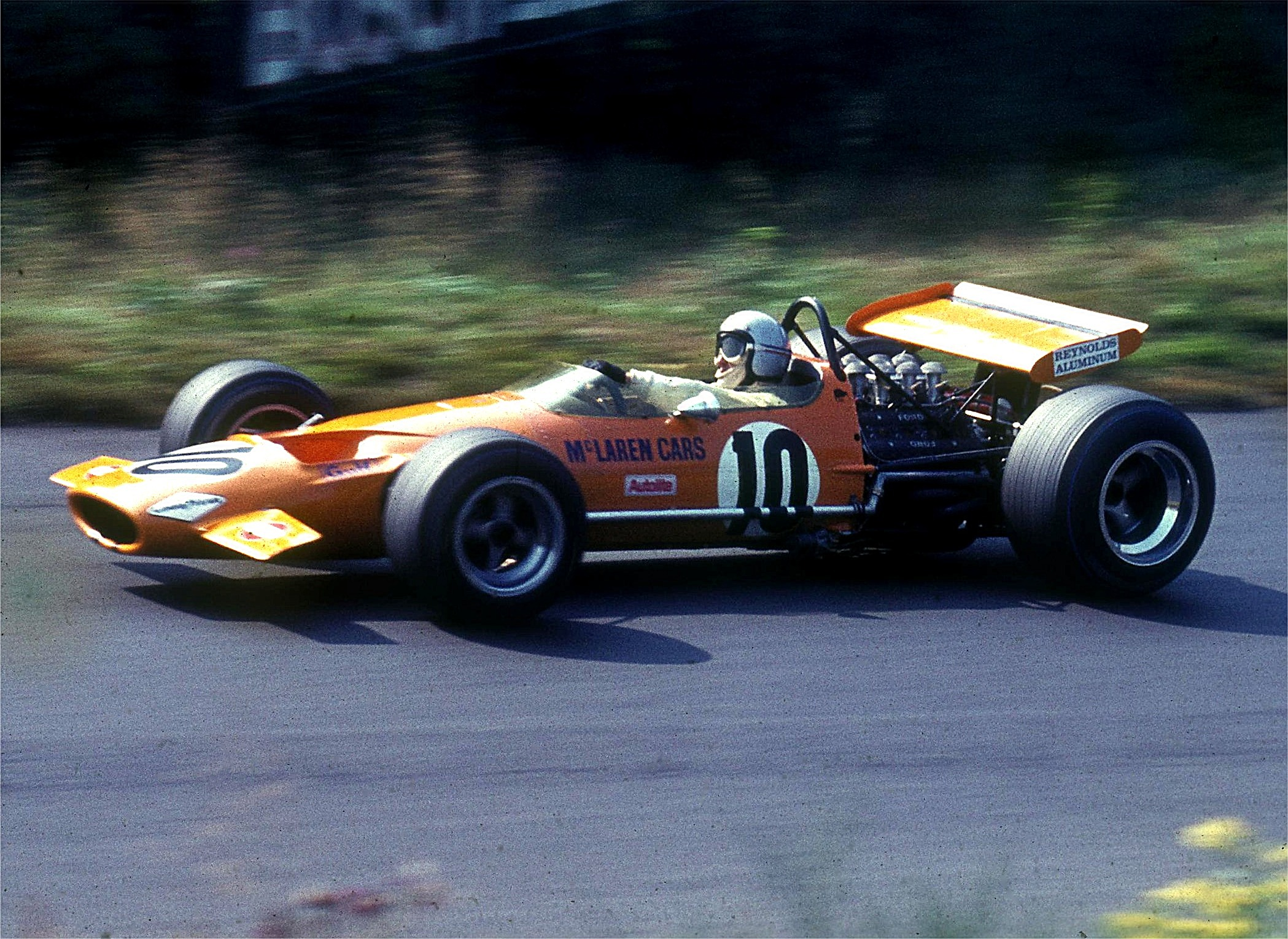
Team founder Bruce McLaren is pictured driving the McLaren M7C at the 1969 German Grand Prix.

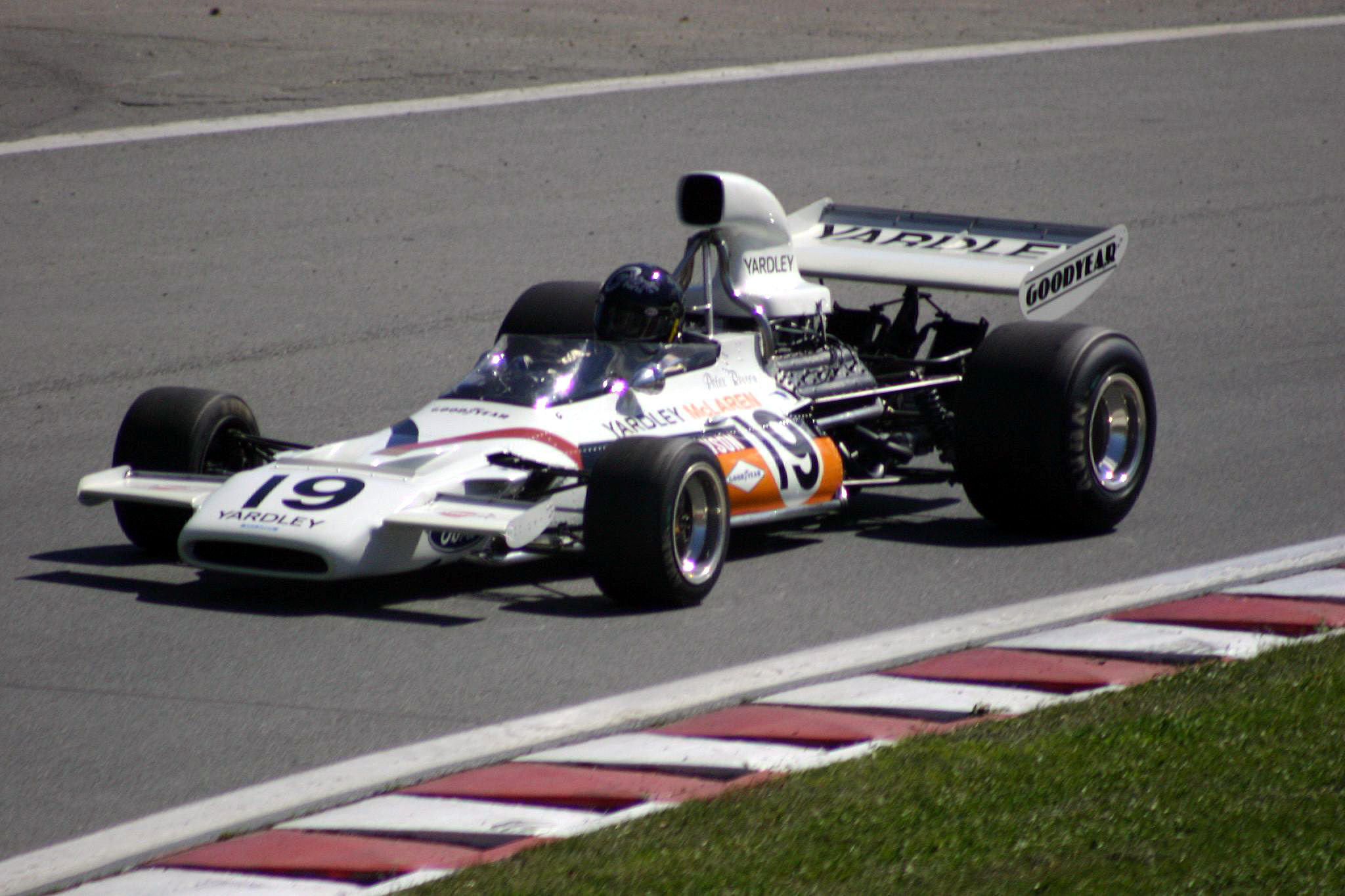
The team's first sponsorship deal was with Yardley, who branded McLarens such as this M19C (shown being demonstrated at the 2004 Canadian Grand Prix weekend).

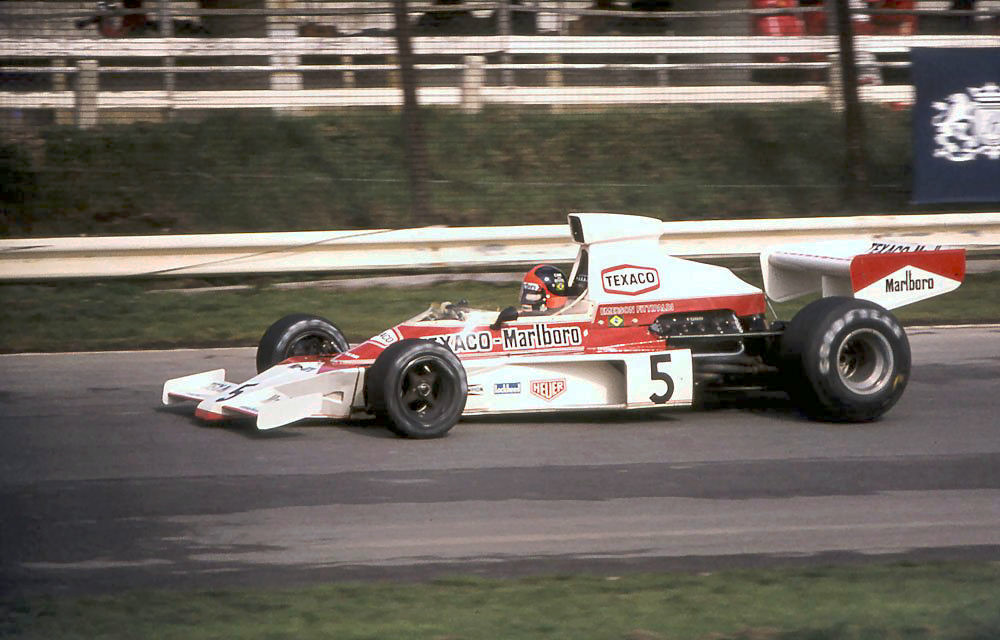
Marlboro colours first appeared on a McLaren in the 1974 season. This is Emerson Fittipaldi driving the McLaren M23 at the 1974 British Grand Prix.

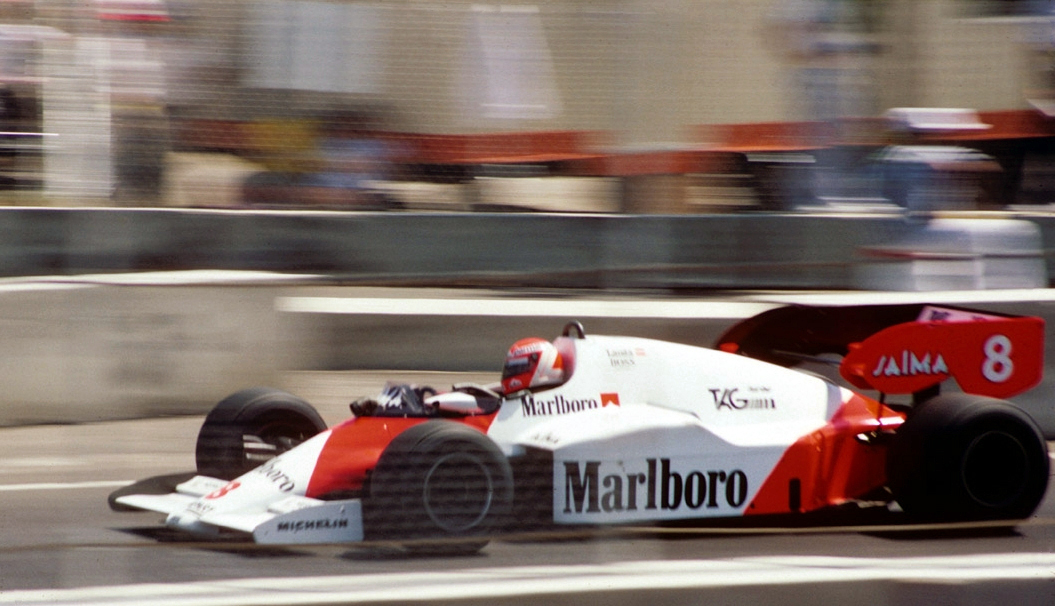
Niki Lauda won his last championship with McLaren in 1984

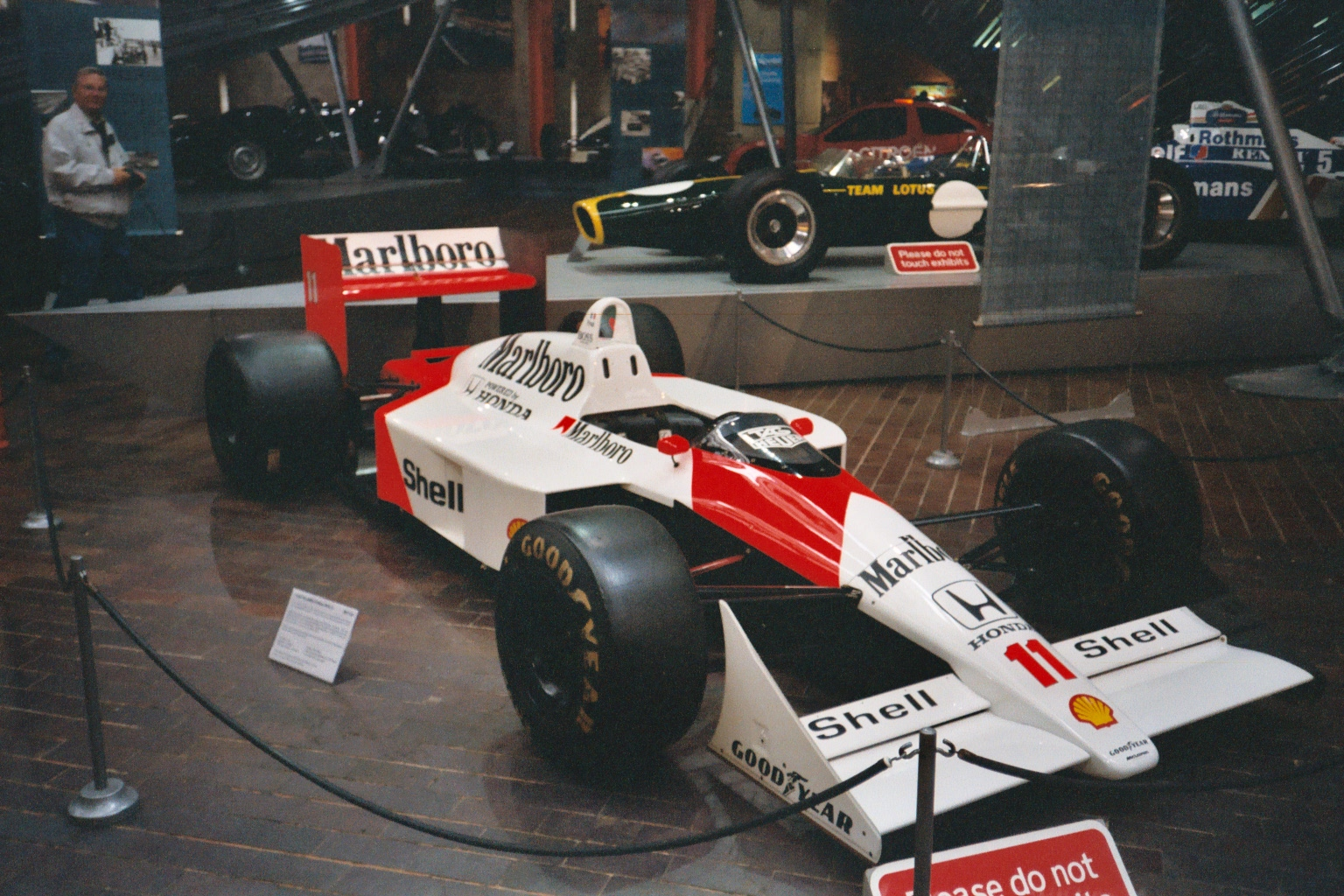
A McLaren MP4/4 from the 1988 season

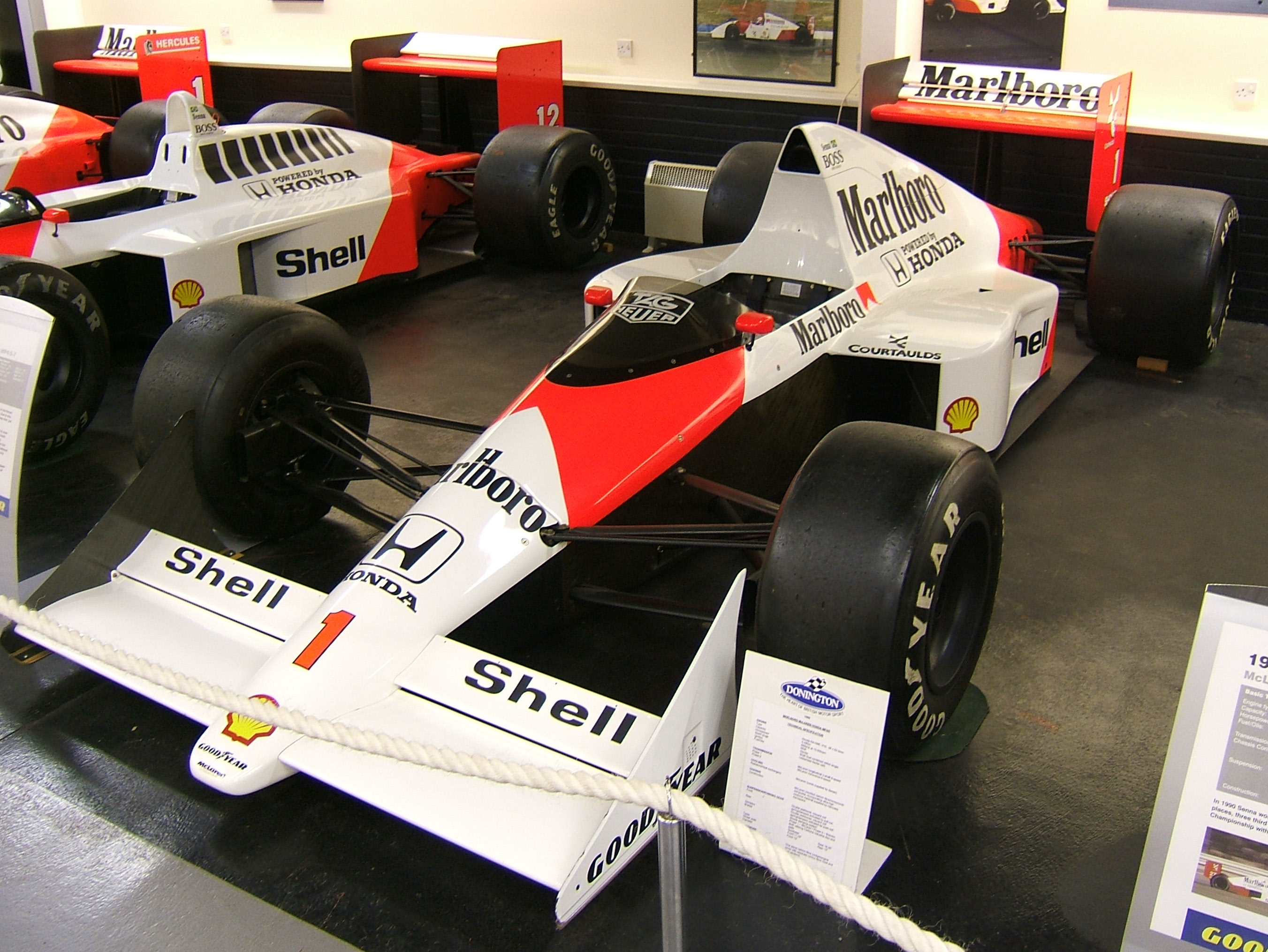
A McLaren MP4/5 from the 1989 season

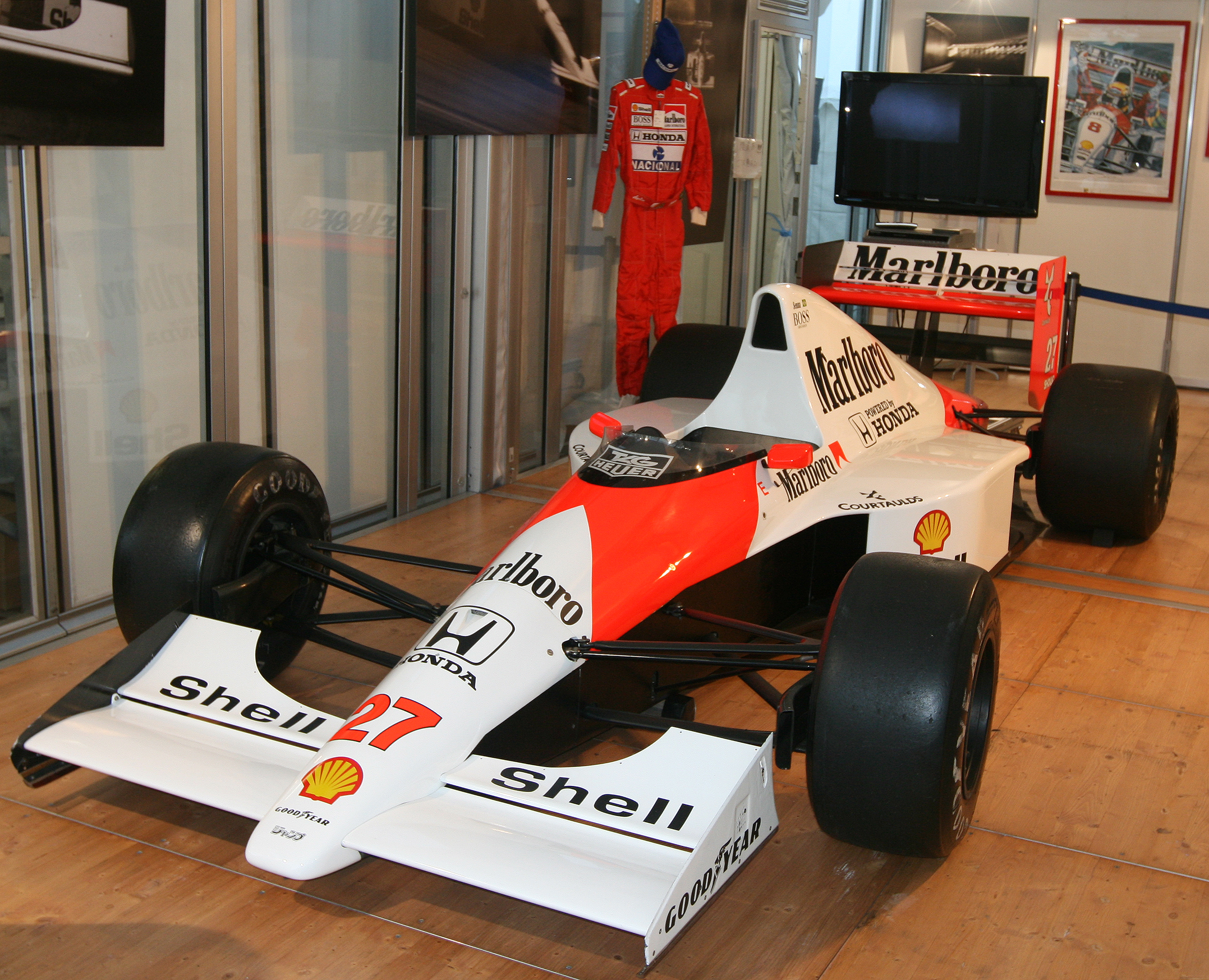
A McLaren from the 1990 season

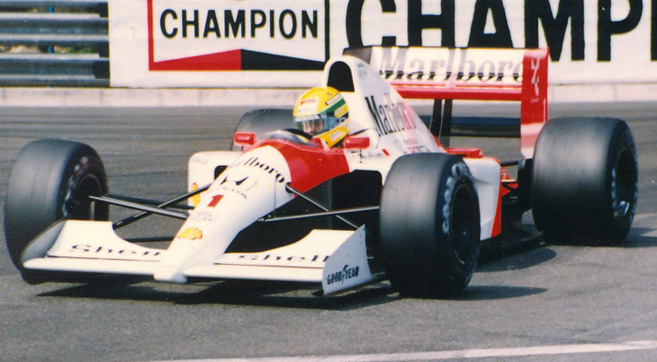
The McLaren–Marlboro partnership lasted from 1974 until the end of 1996, and produced several championships, including Ayrton Senna in 1991.

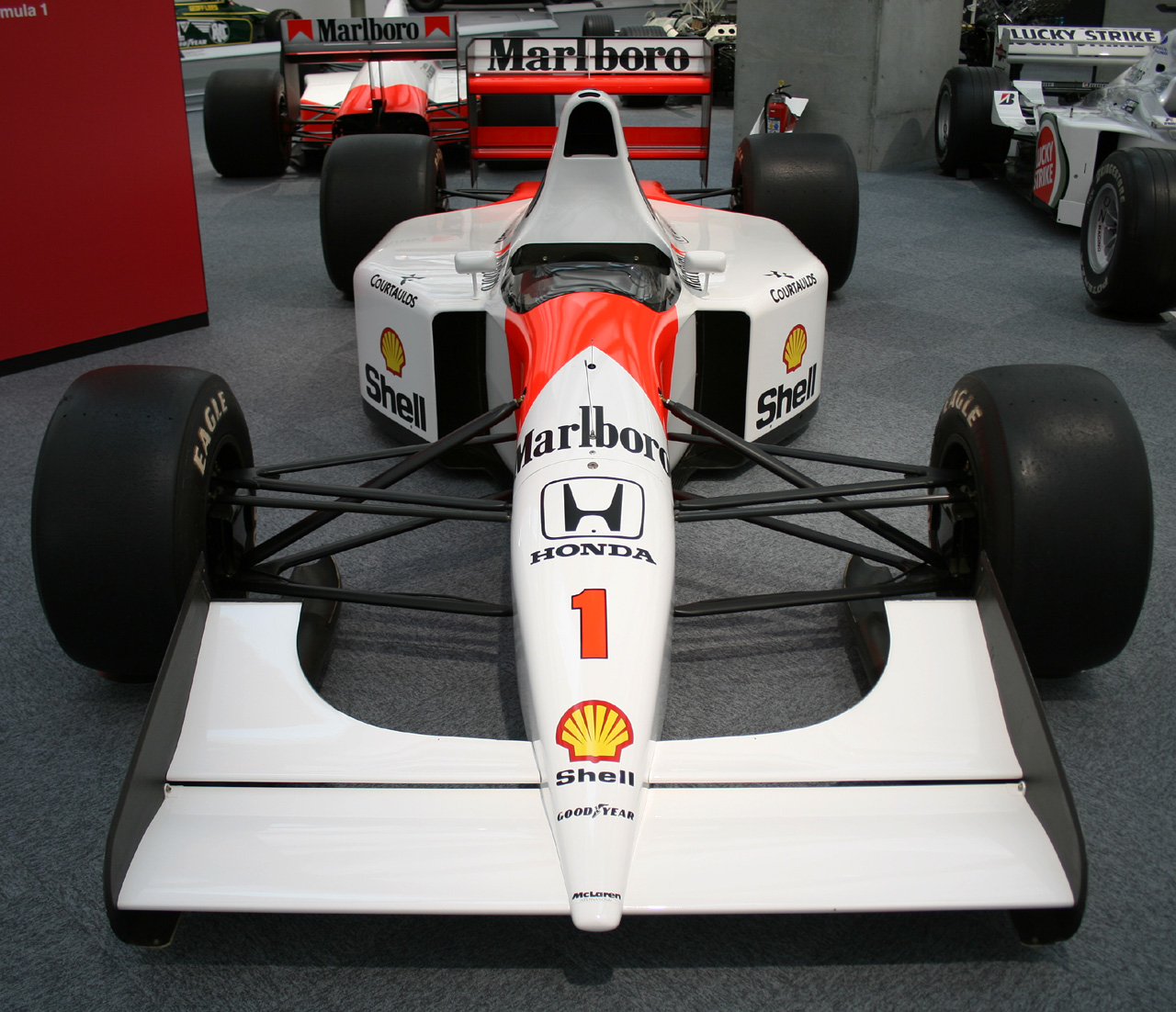
A McLaren from the 1992 season

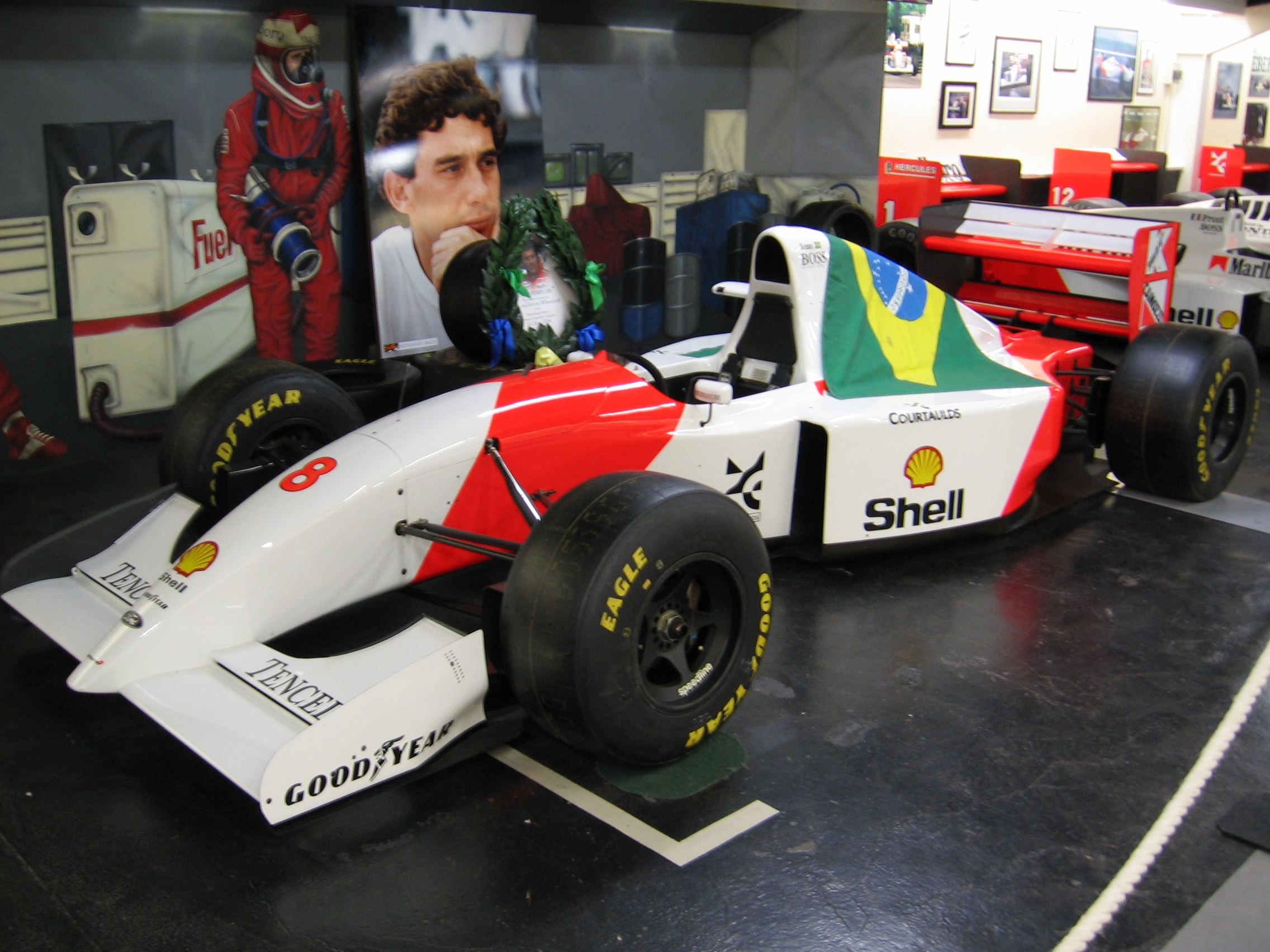
Ayrton Senna's MP4/8 on display at Donington, the site of his famous wet-weather victory in 1993.

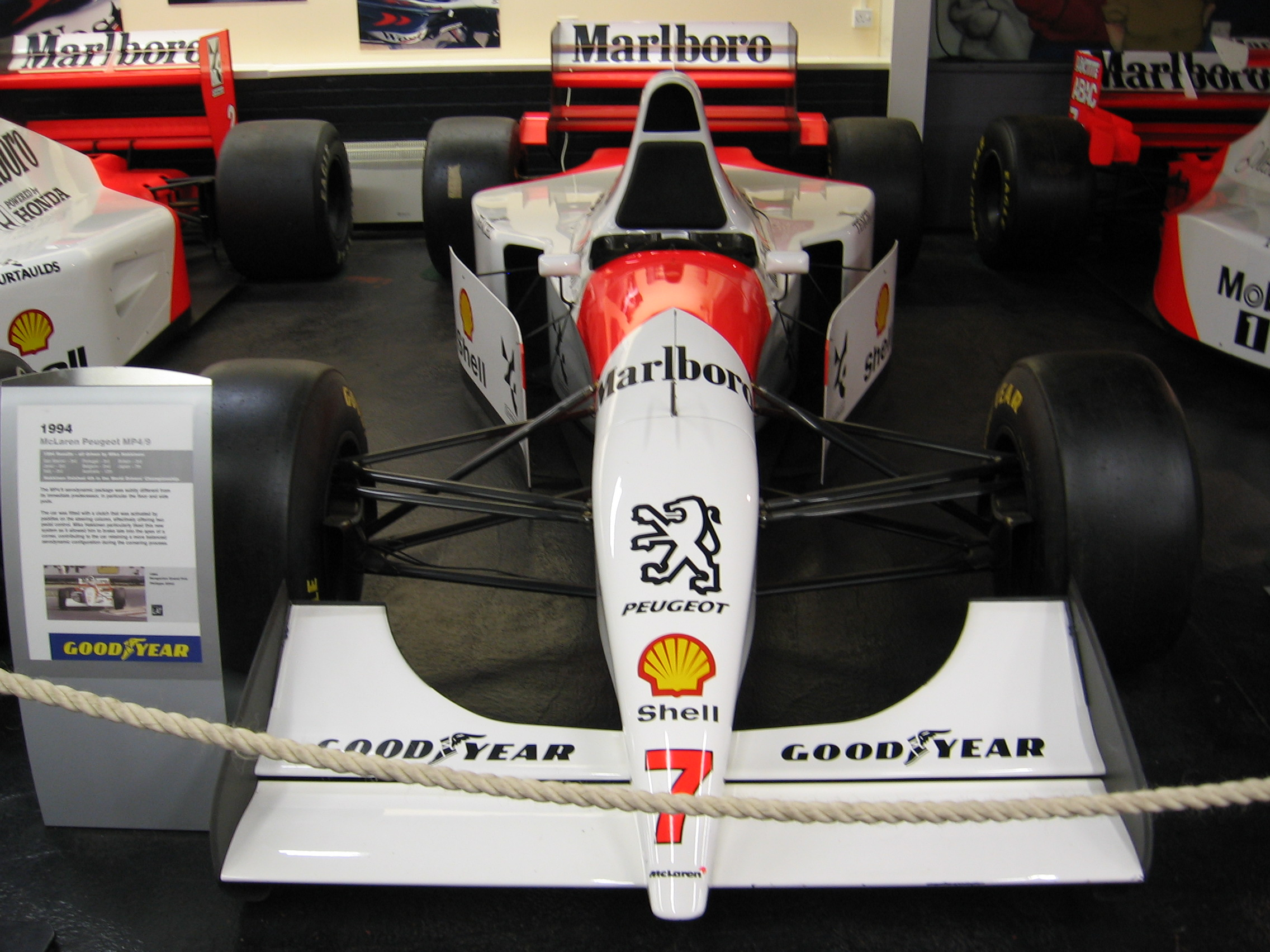
Mika Häkkinen's McLaren from the 1994 season on display

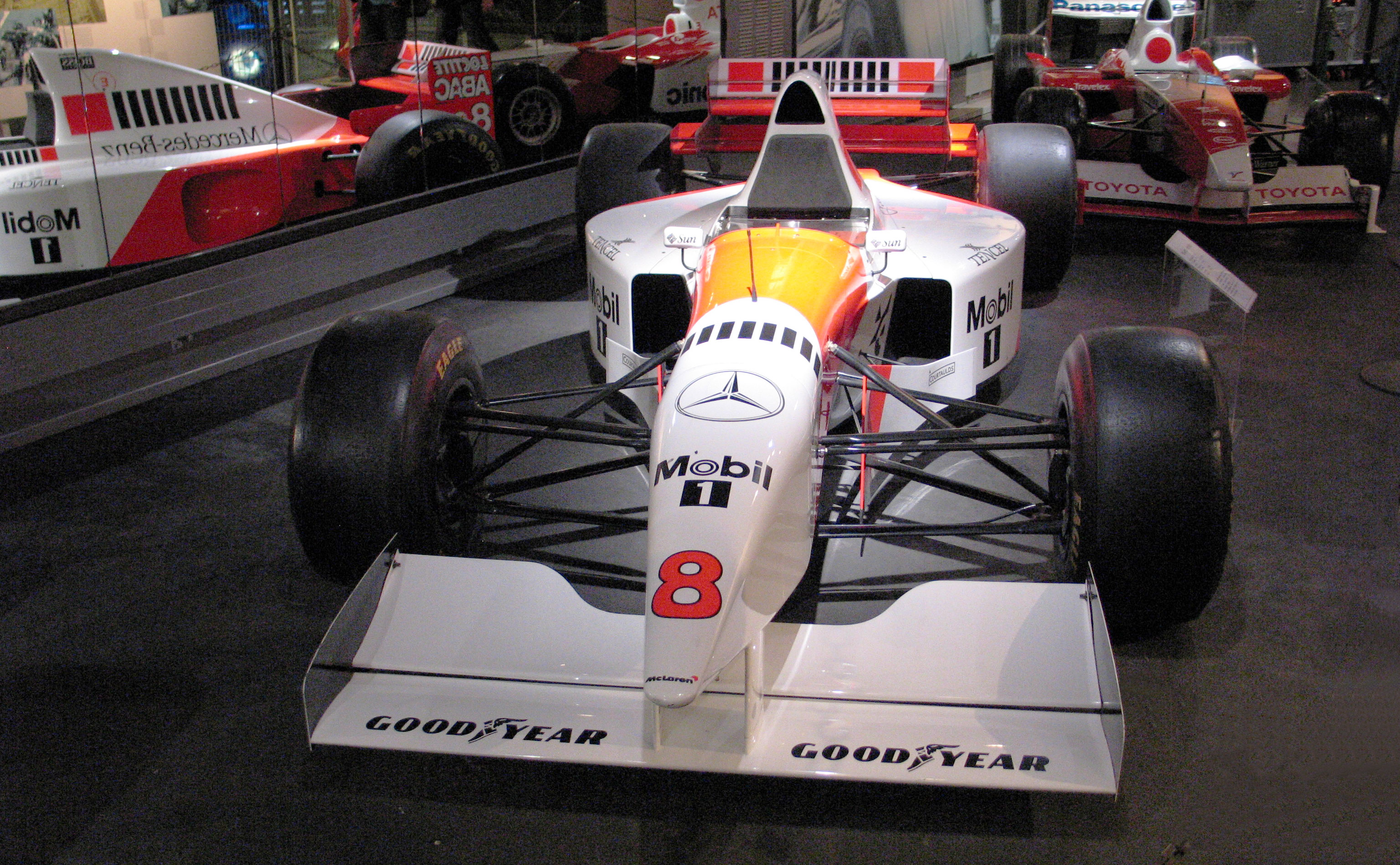
Mika Häkkinen's McLaren from 1995 season in its non-tobacco livery, this was the first season when McLaren switched from Peugeot power to Mercedes power

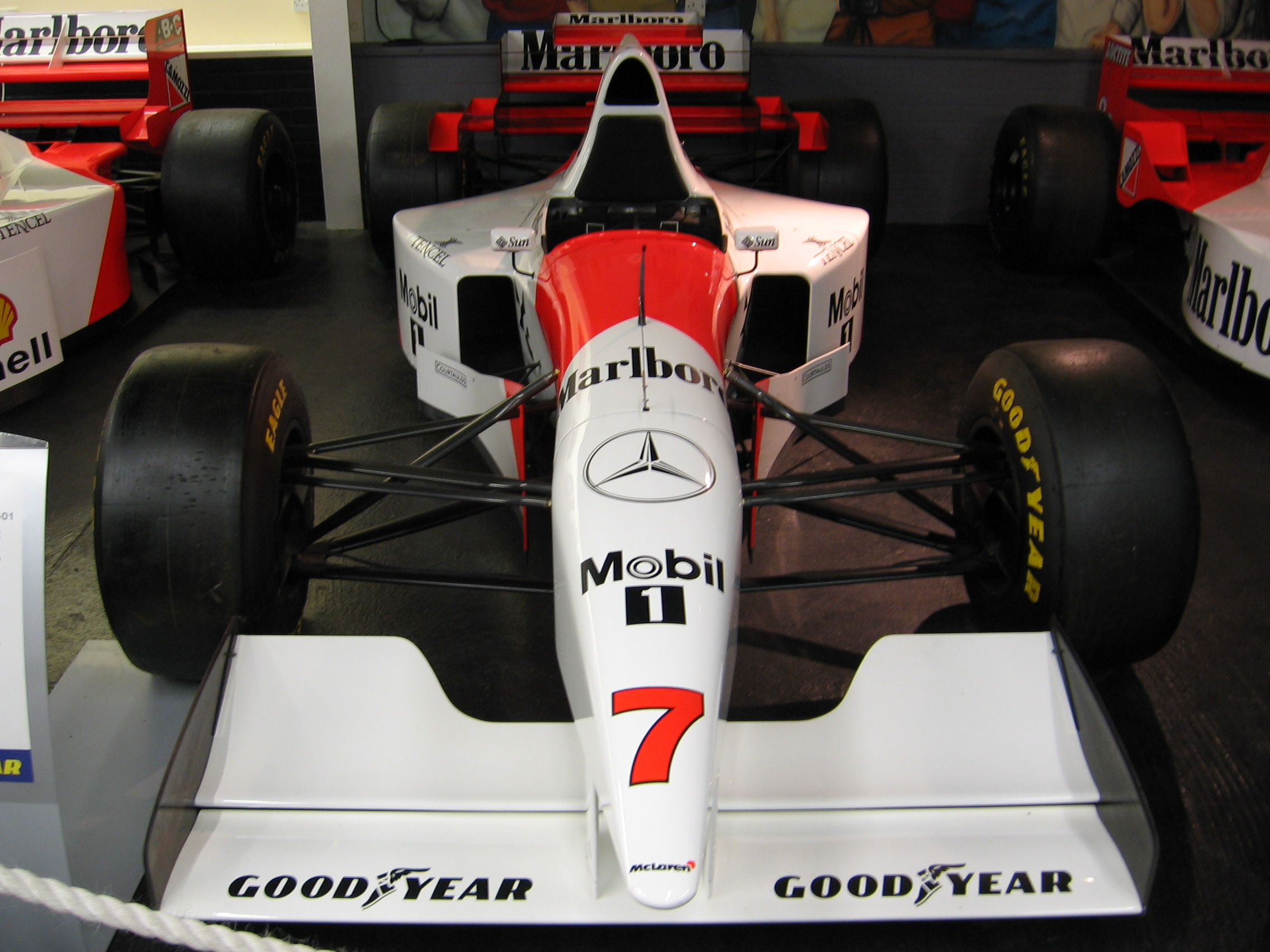
A McLaren MP4/10B from 1995, this was the last F1 car driven by Nigel Mansell

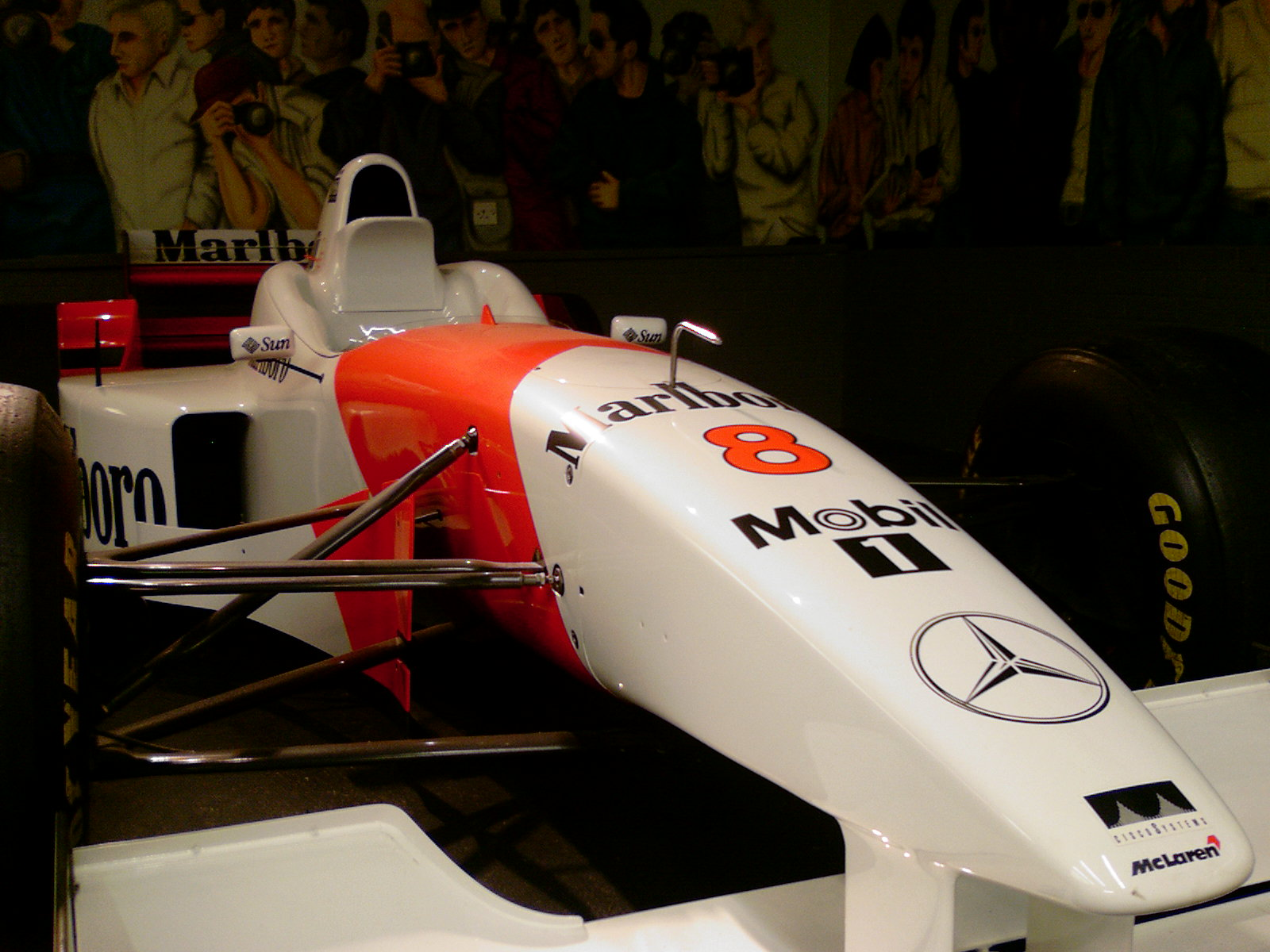
David Coulthard's McLaren MP4/11 exhibited as part of the McLaren Hall, Donington Grand Prix Exhibition

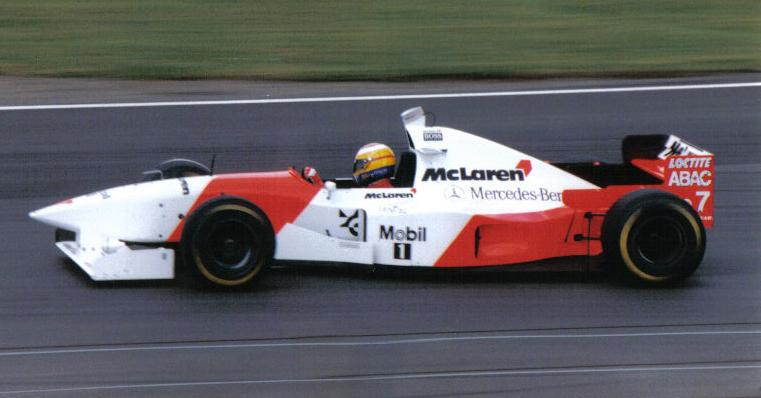
Mark Blundell driving a McLaren at the 1995 British GP

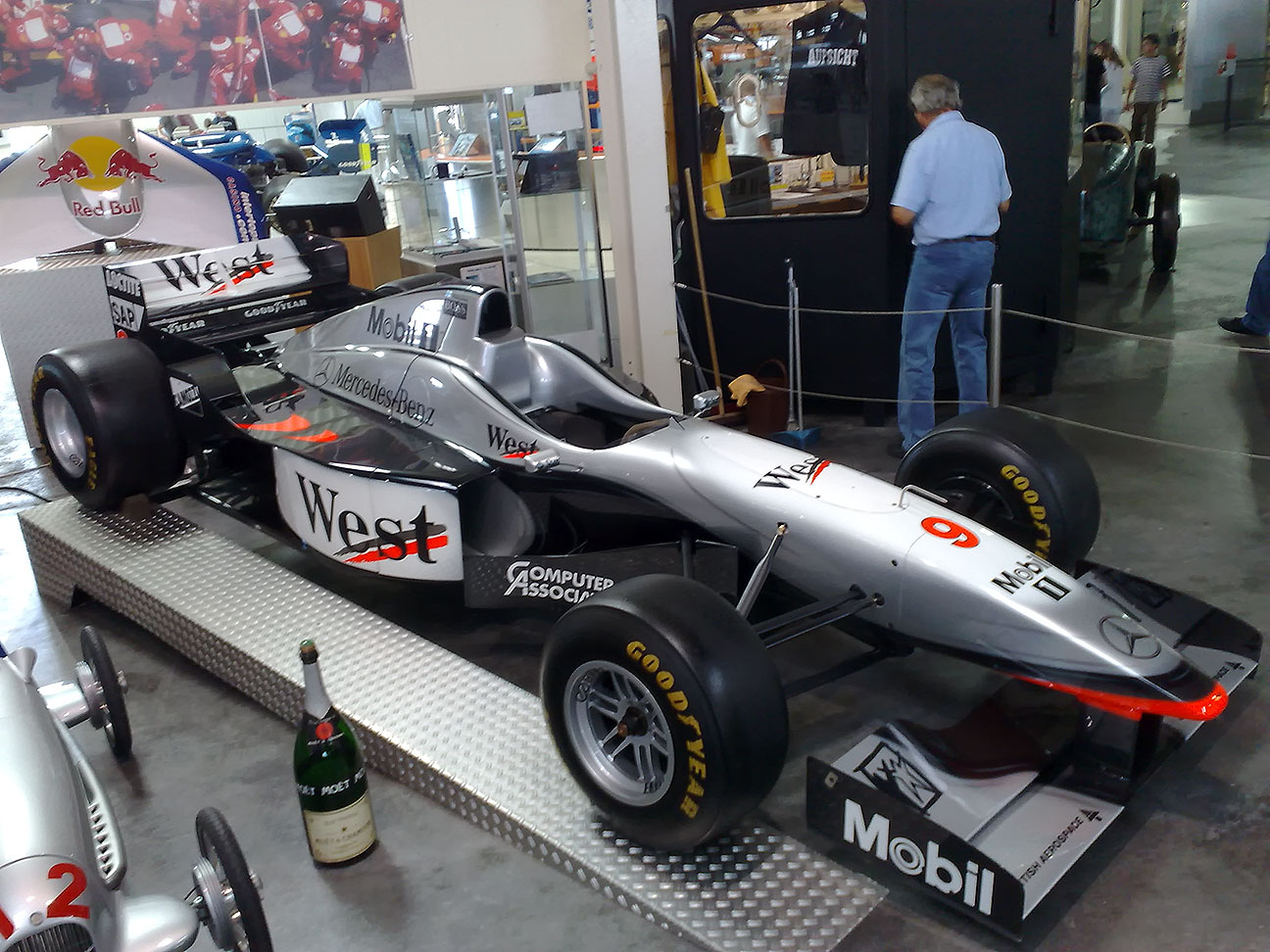
A McLaren MP4/12 in West livery

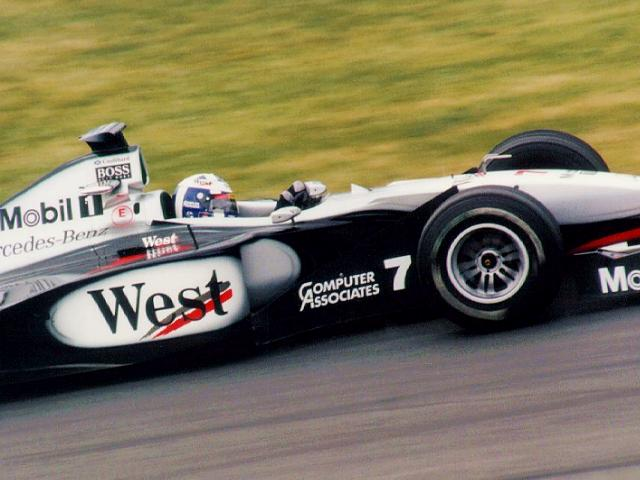
David Coulthard driving for McLaren in 1998

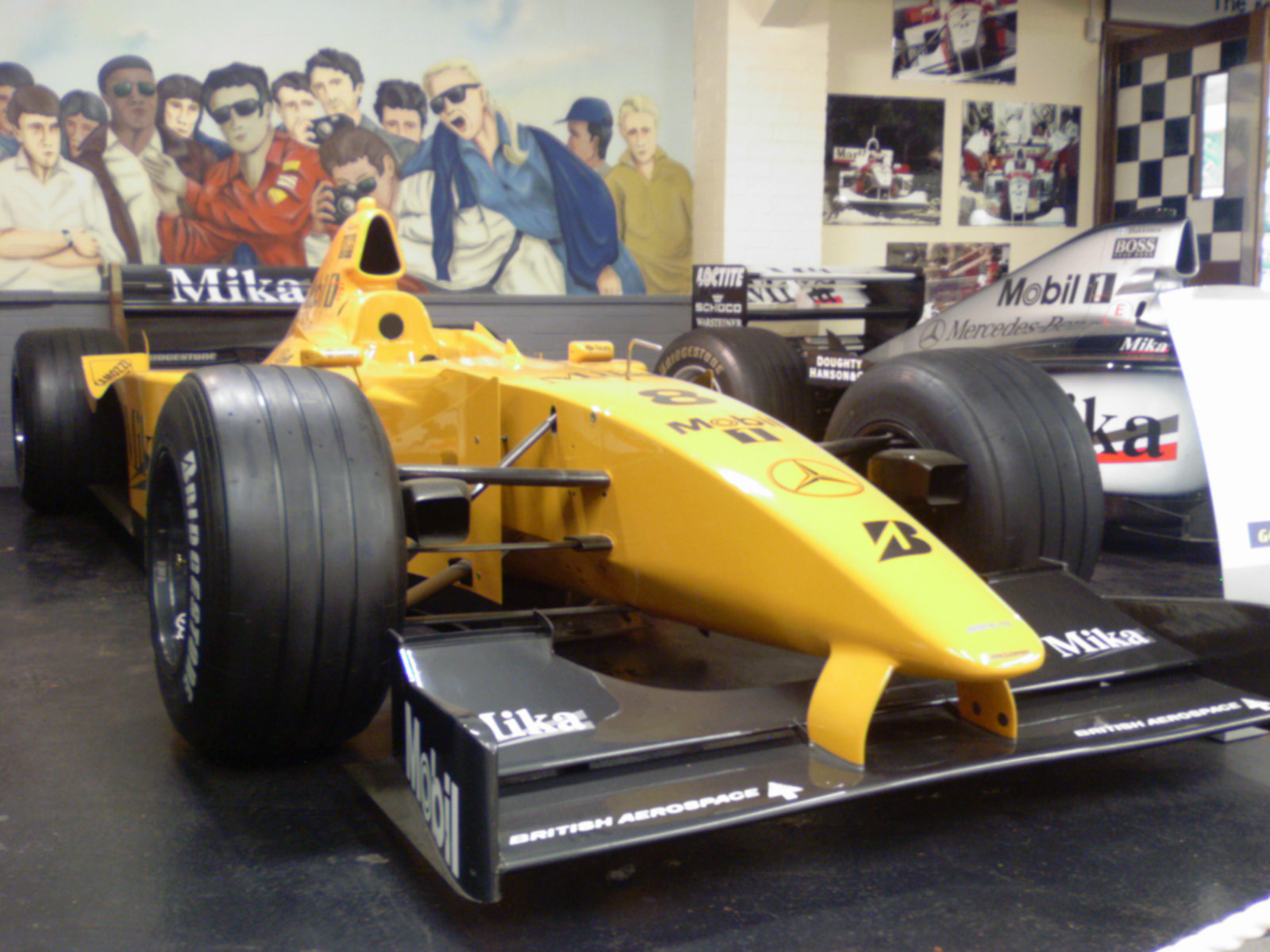
Mika Häkkinen's McLaren in Test Livery from the 1998 season

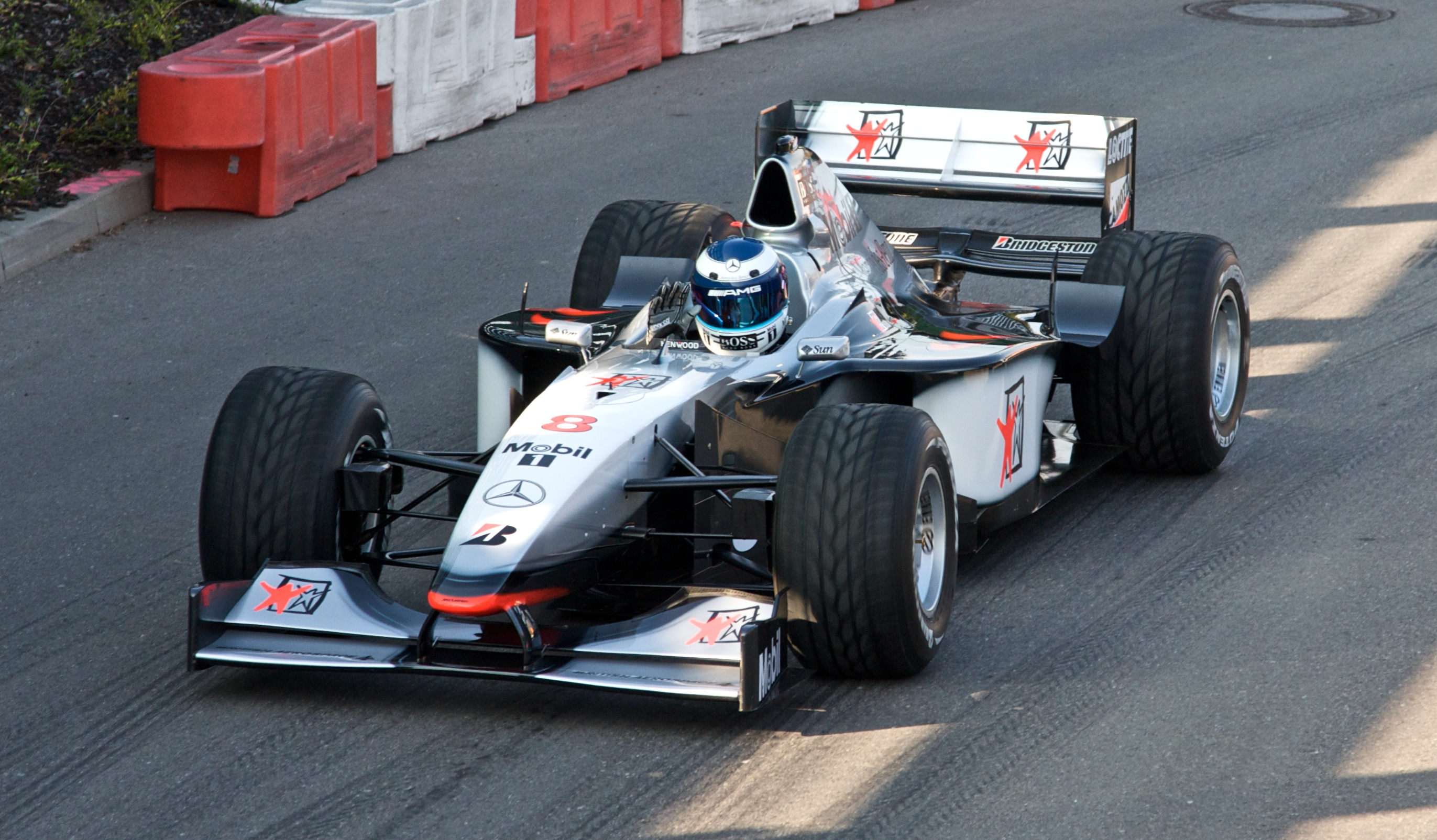
Häkkinen driving a McLaren MP4/13 in its non-tobacco livery

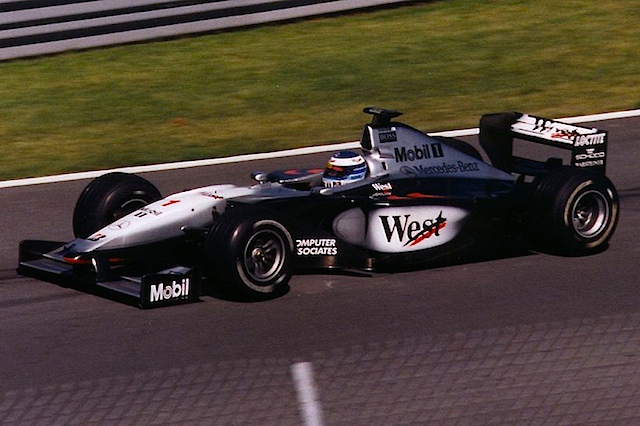
Mika Häkkinen driving for McLaren at the 1999 Canadian GP

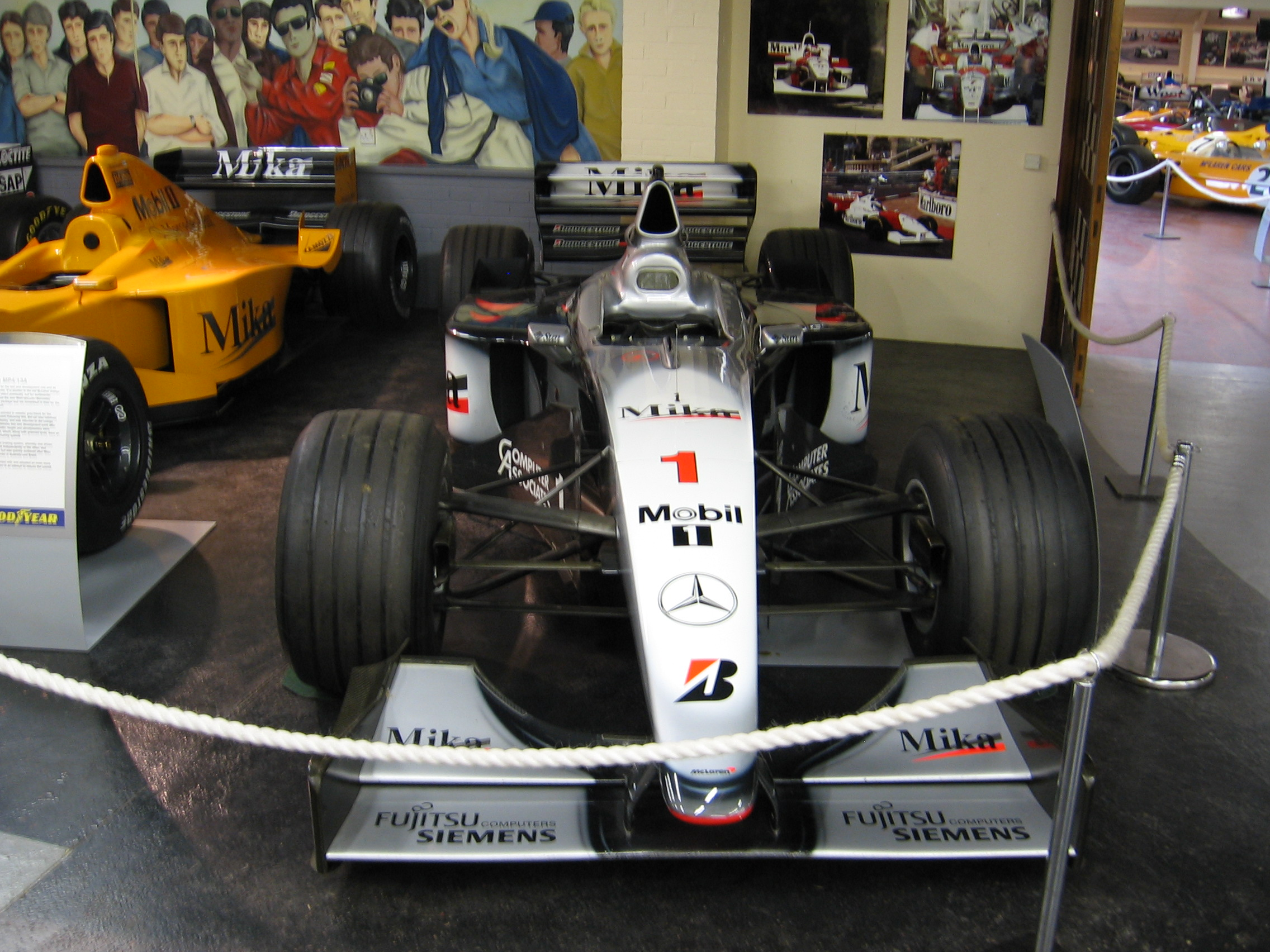
A McLaren MP4/14 on display at the Donington Collection. The car carries chassis number 4 and is in the state it crossed the line to win both the 1999 Japanese Grand Prix and the Formula One Drivers' Championship for its driver, Mika Häkkinen.

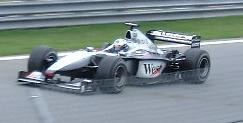
Coulthard driving a McLaren at the 2000 Canadian GP

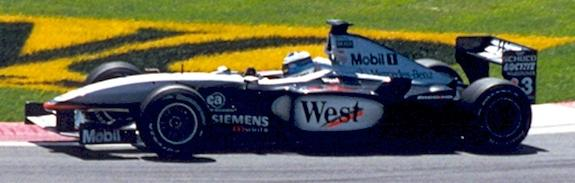
Mika Häkkinen driving a McLaren at the 2001 Canadian GP, this was his last season

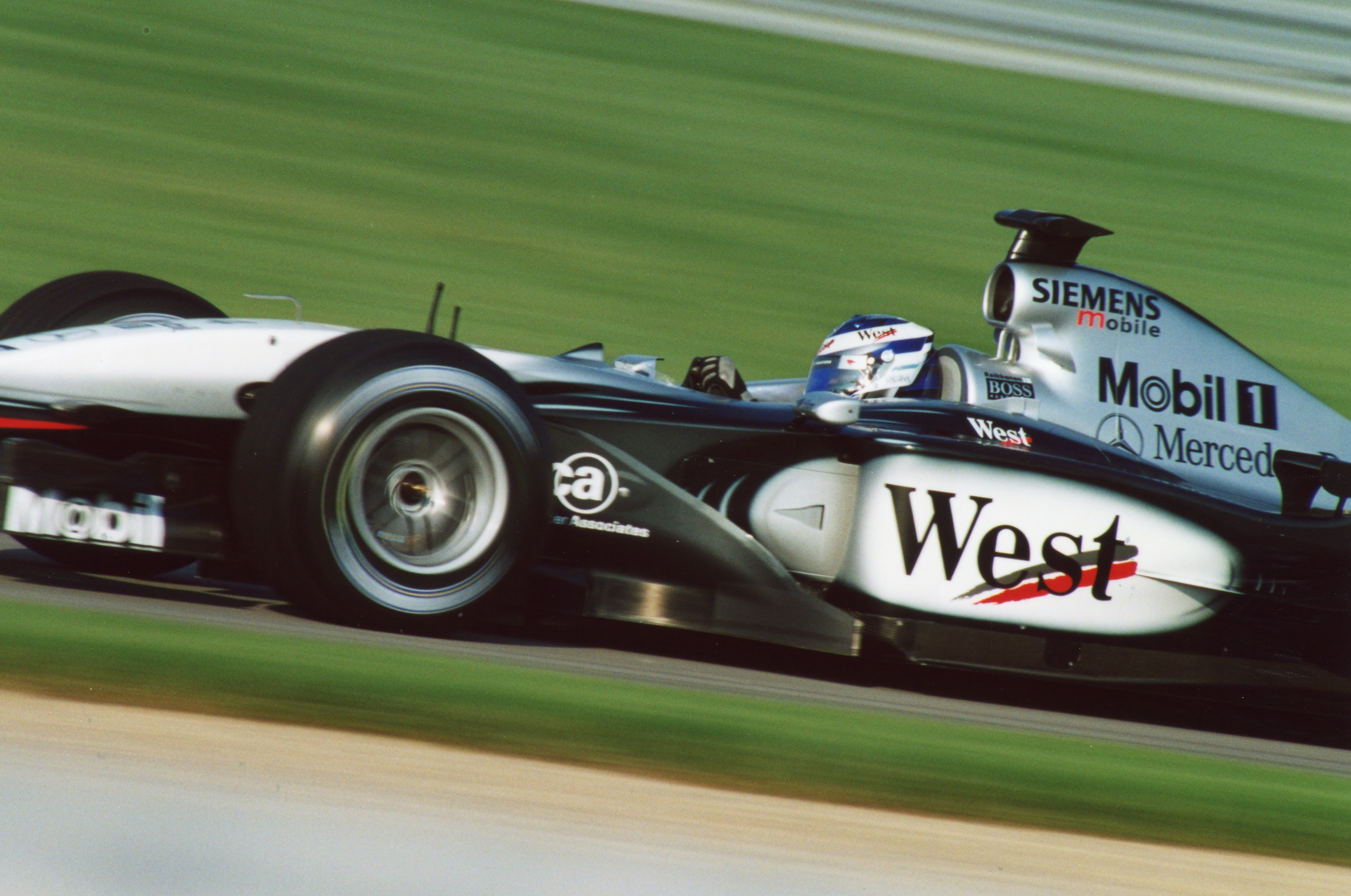
Räikkönen driving the MP4-17 in 2002

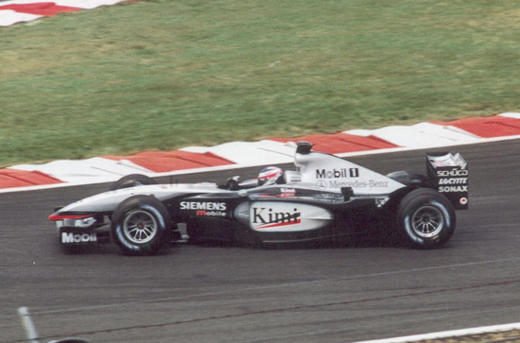
Kimi Räikkönen driving the McLaren MP4-17D in 2003

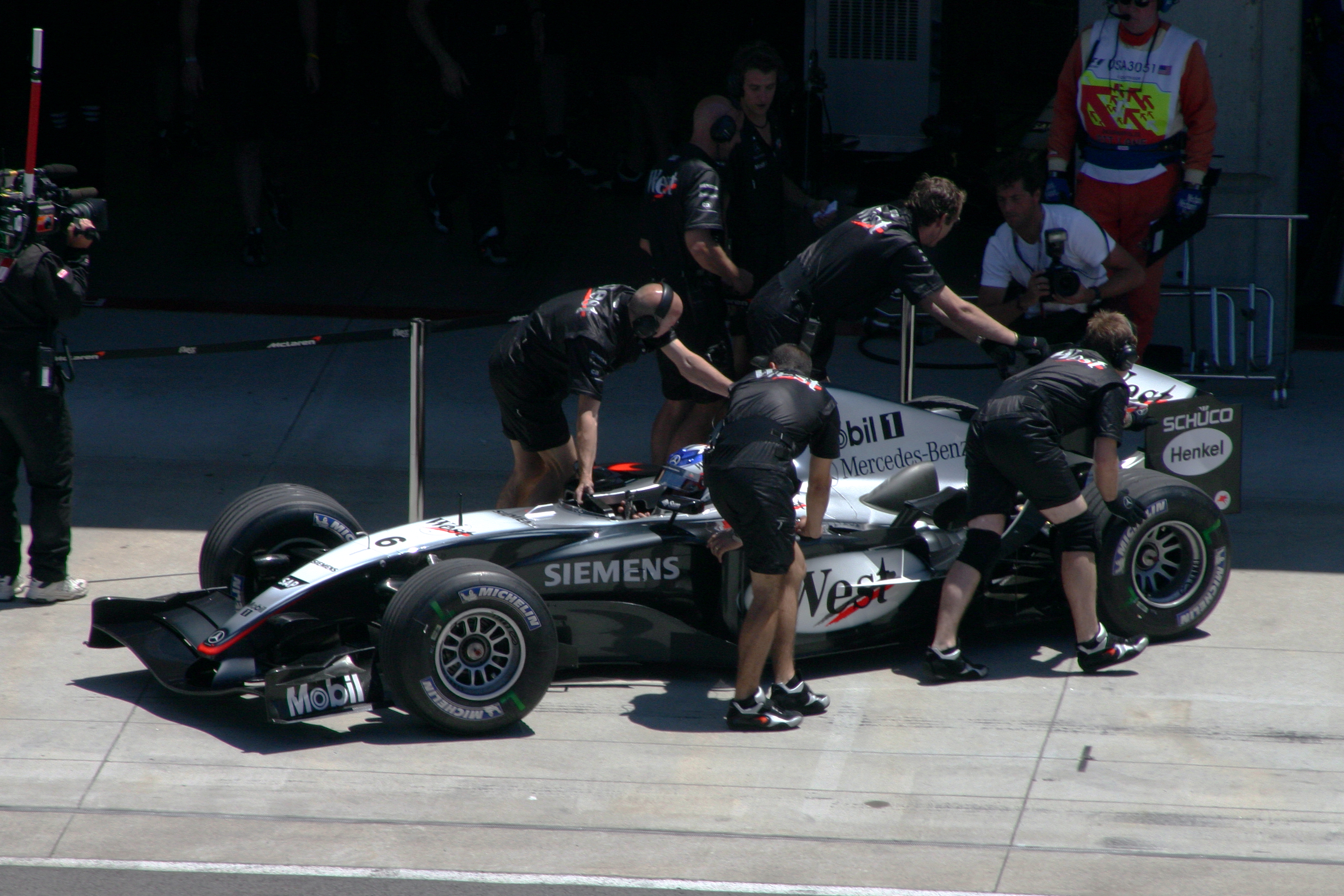
The McLaren MP4-19 at the 2004 US GP

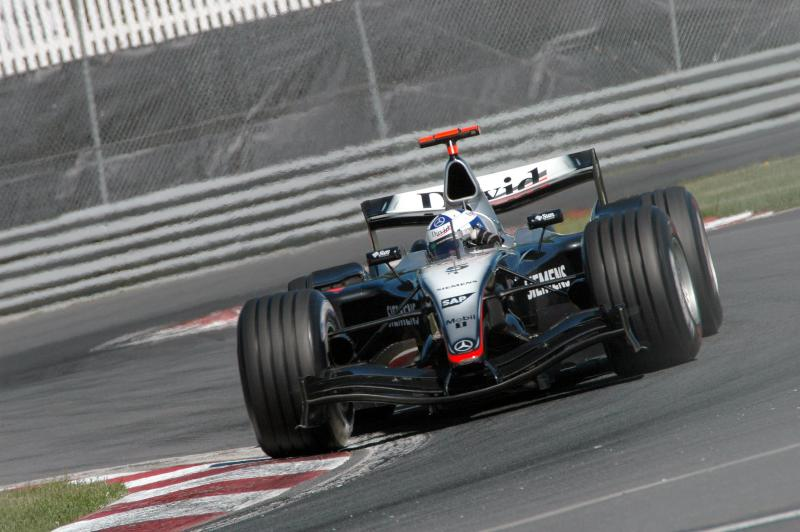
David Coulthard at the 2004 Canadian GP

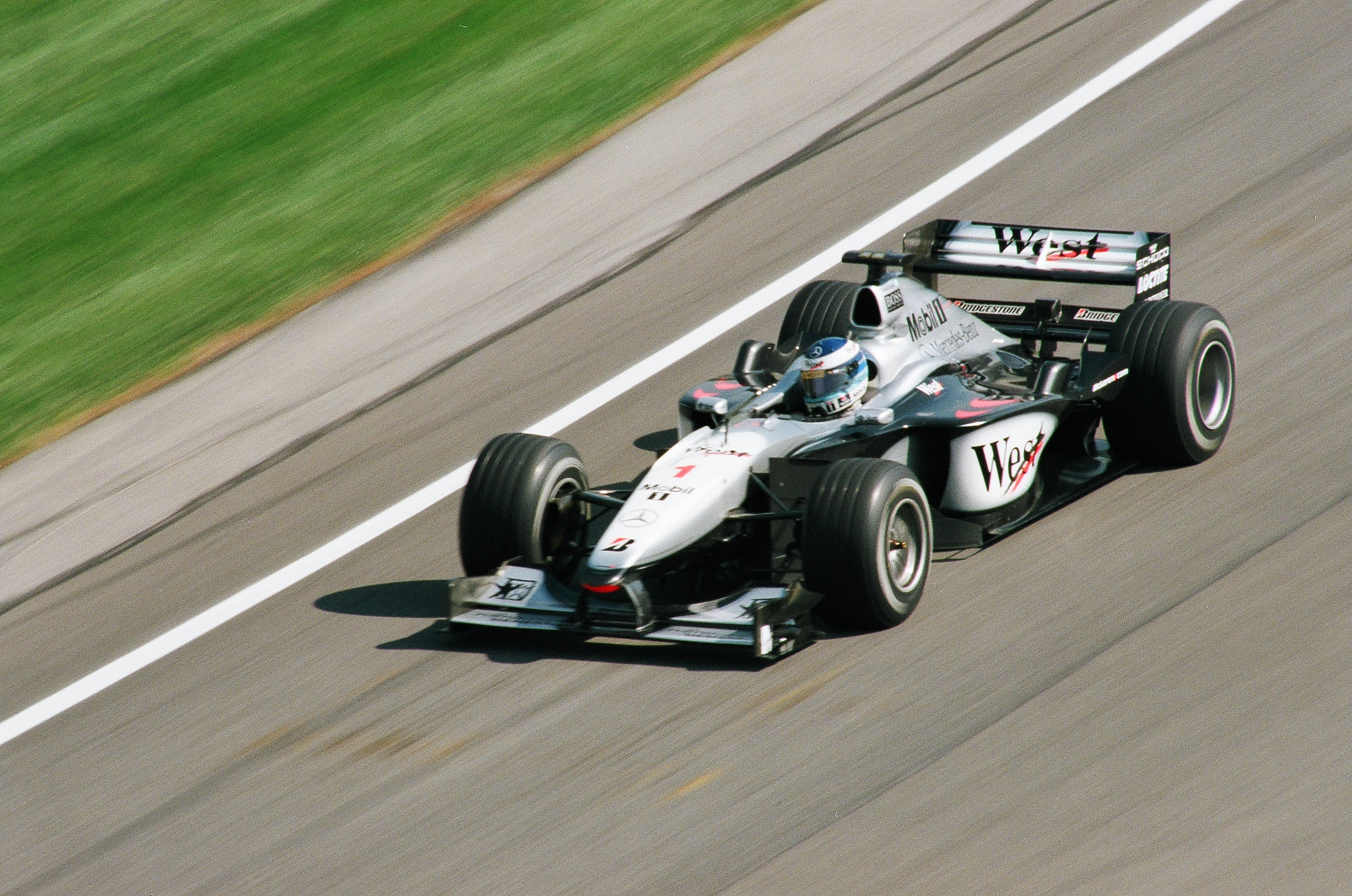
From 1997 to July 2005, McLaren switched to West. This is Mika Häkkinen driving the McLaren MP4-15 at the 2000 United States Grand Prix.

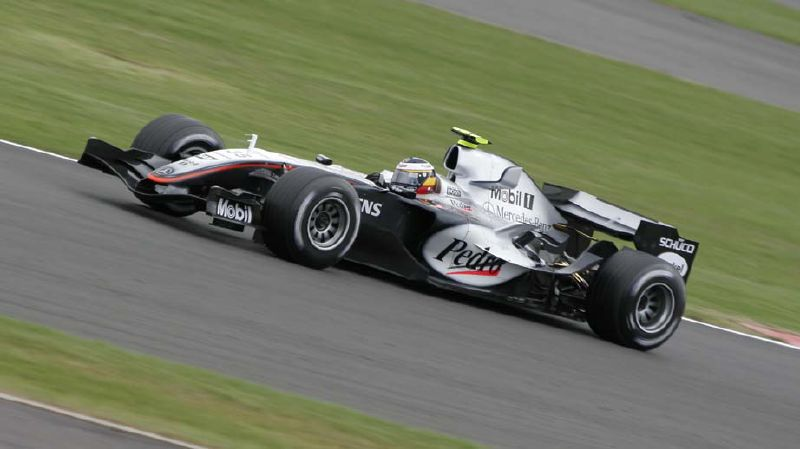
At races where tobacco advertising was not allowed, the "West" logos were replaced with the driver's name in a similar – but subtly different – style. Thus Pedro de la Rosa's McLaren MP4-20 was branded "Pedro" at the 2005 British Grand Prix. Following the termination of the West sponsorship contract in July 2005 the driver's names were in a completely different style for the remainder of the year.

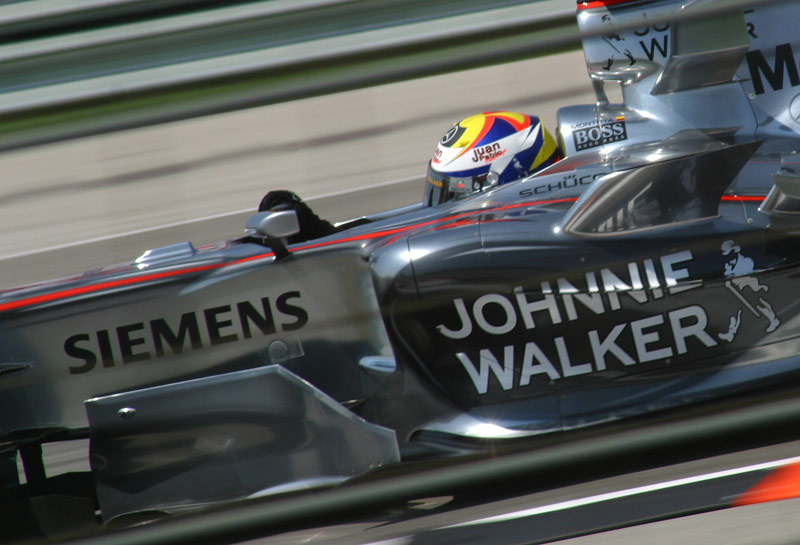
McLaren had no title sponsor in 2006 but the Johnnie Walker logo was used on the side pods, as evidenced by Juan Pablo Montoya's McLaren MP4-21 at the 2006 United States Grand Prix. From this year onwards, the team has also used a highly reflective version of its silver livery.

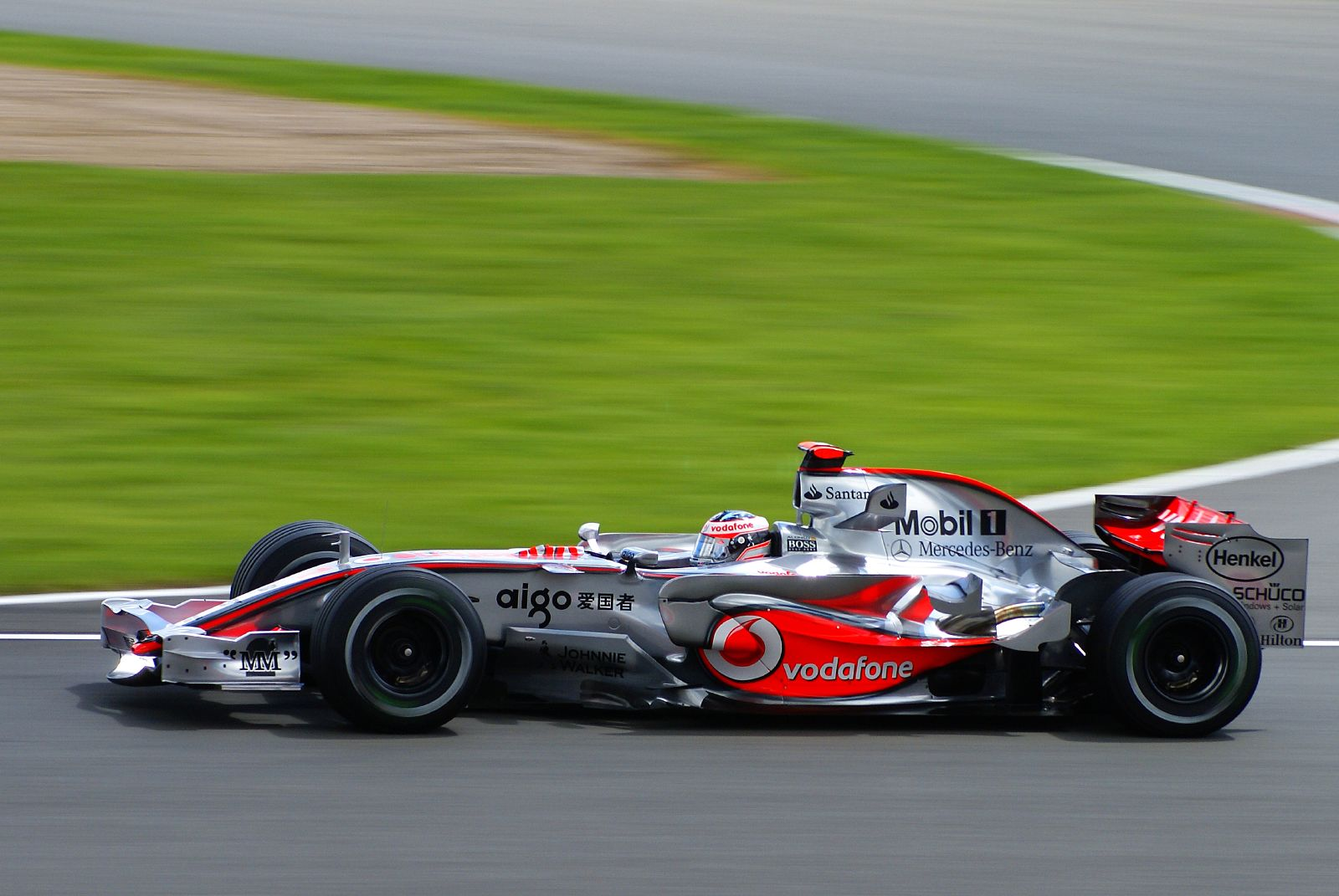
From 2007 until 2013 inclusive, McLaren's title sponsor was Vodafone. This is Fernando Alonso at the 2007 British Grand Prix.

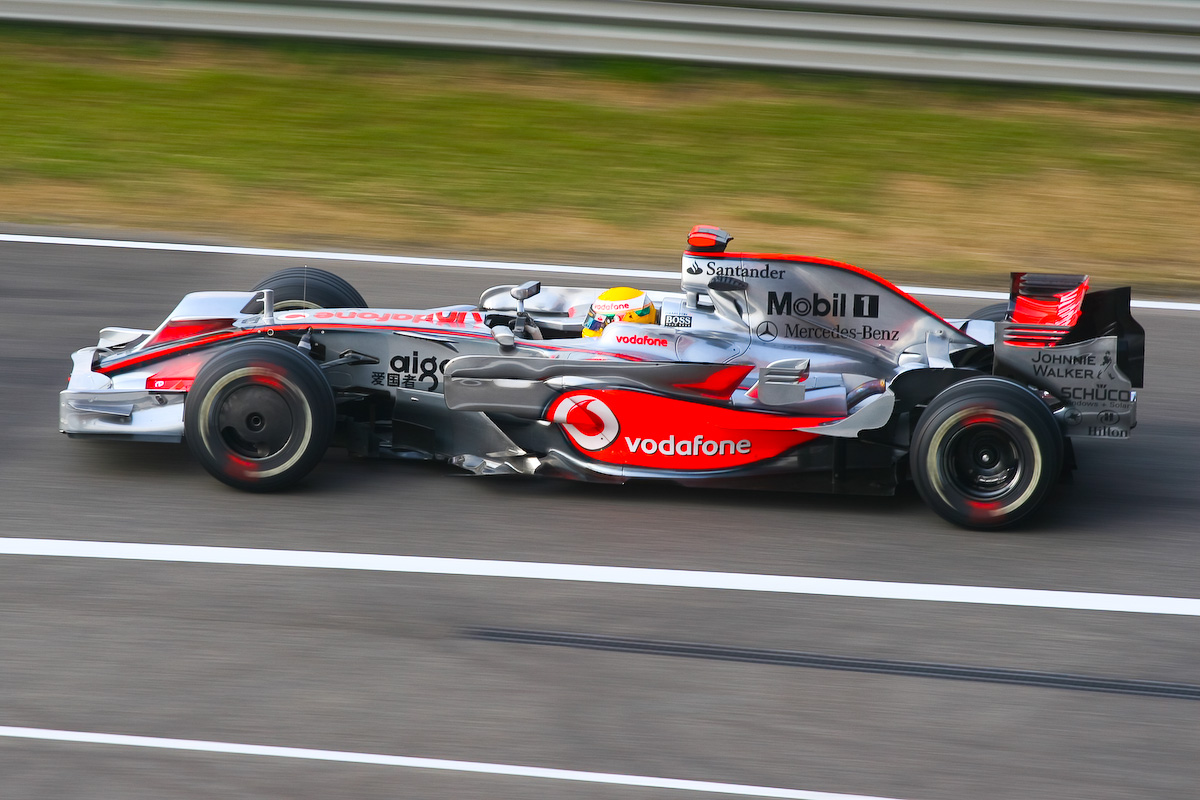
Lewis Hamilton driving the McLaren MP4-23 at the 2008 Chinese Grand Prix.

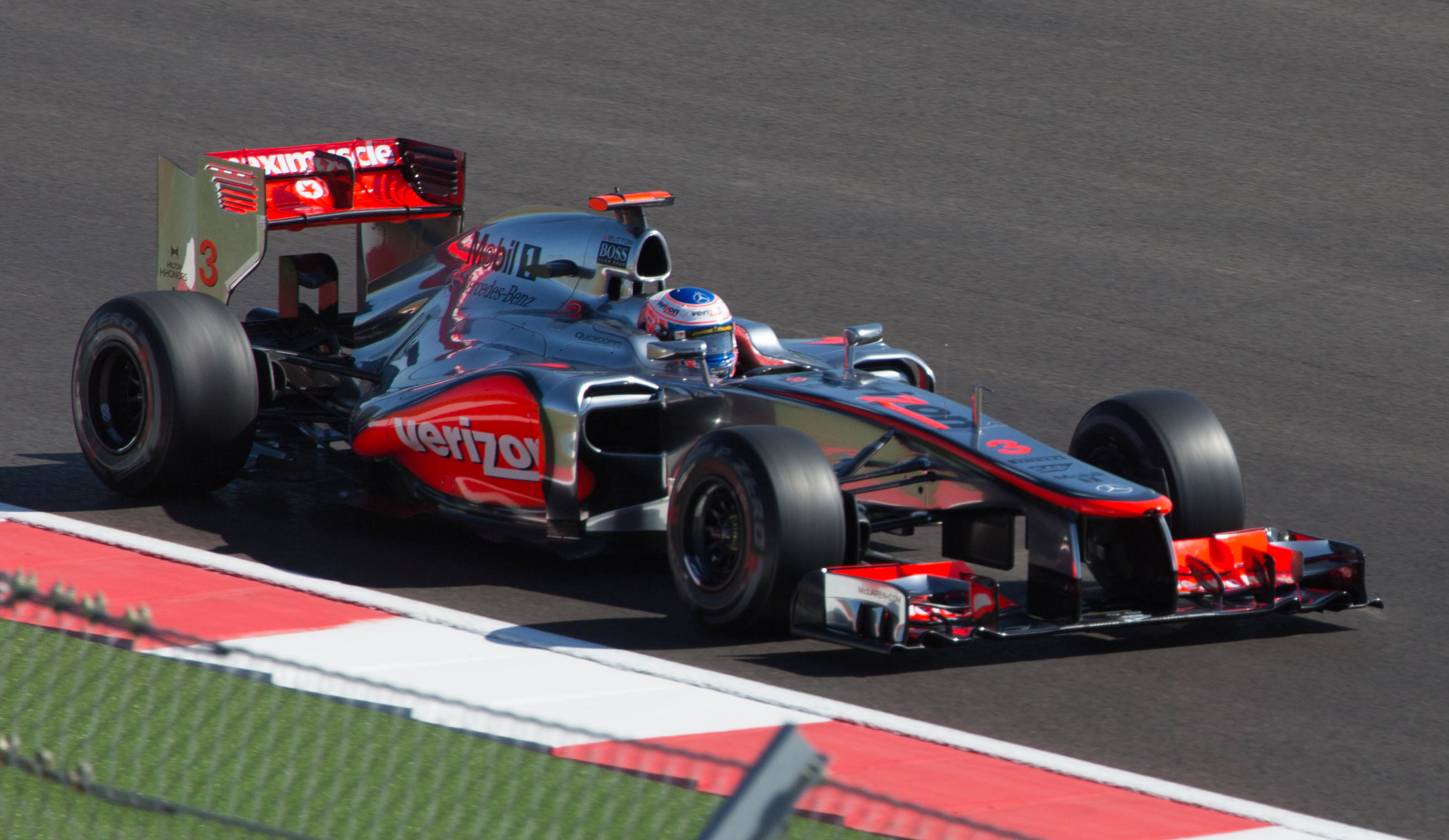
Due to the mutual marketing interest of Vodafone and Verizon, McLaren cars run with Verizon advertisements in North America. This is Jenson Button at the 2012 United States Grand Prix.

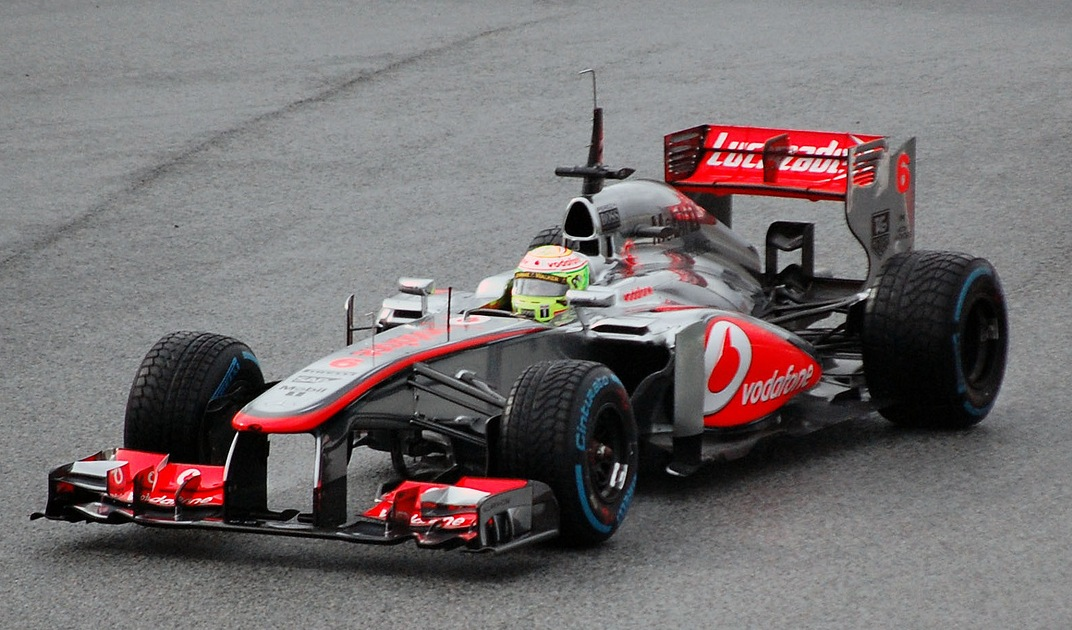
Sergio Pérez testing the McLaren MP4-28 in Montmelo (2013).

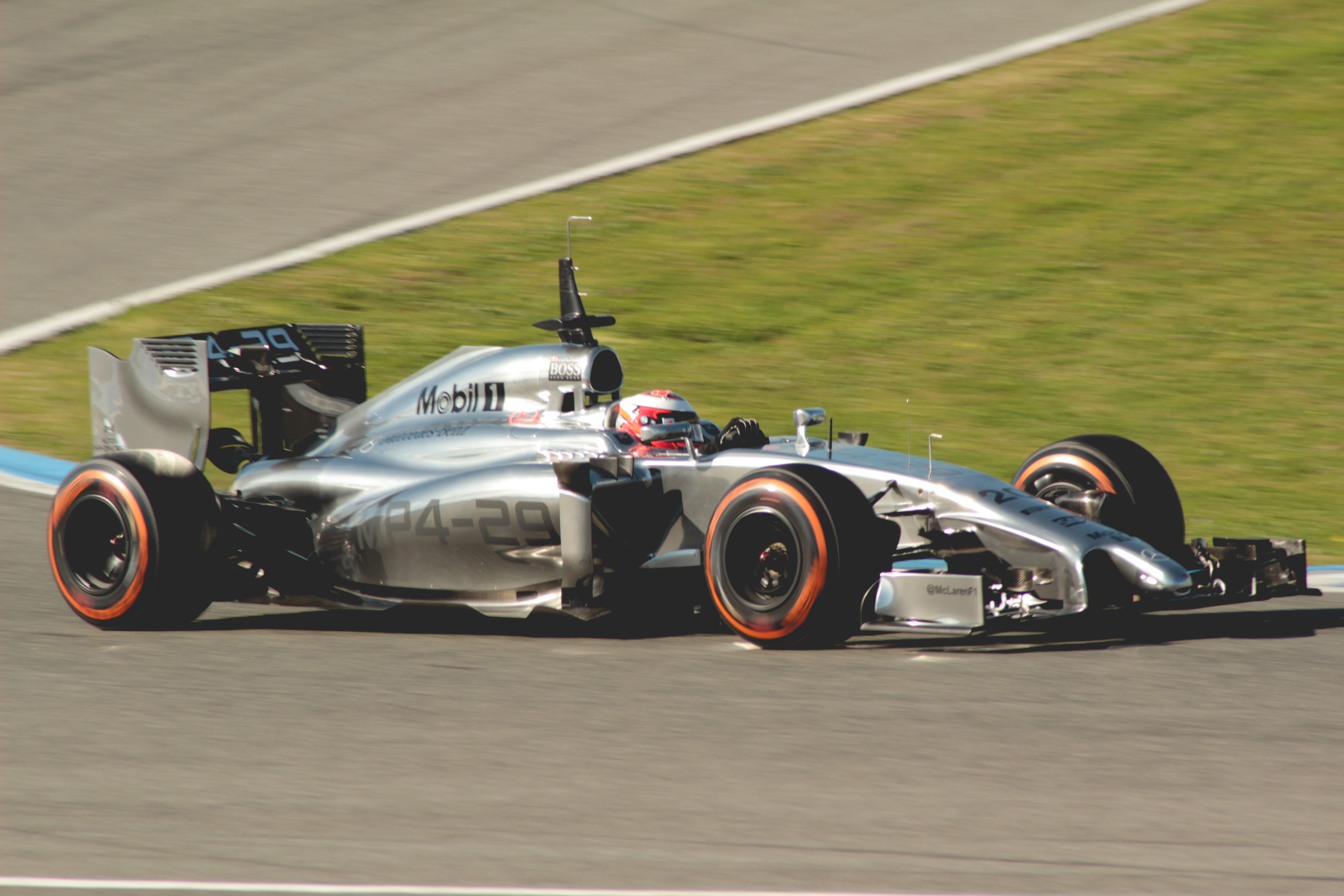
After losing the Vodafone sponsorship in 2013, the McLaren MP4-29 ran with a silver only car, with the car's name on the sidepod, as seen driven by Kevin Magnussen (2014).

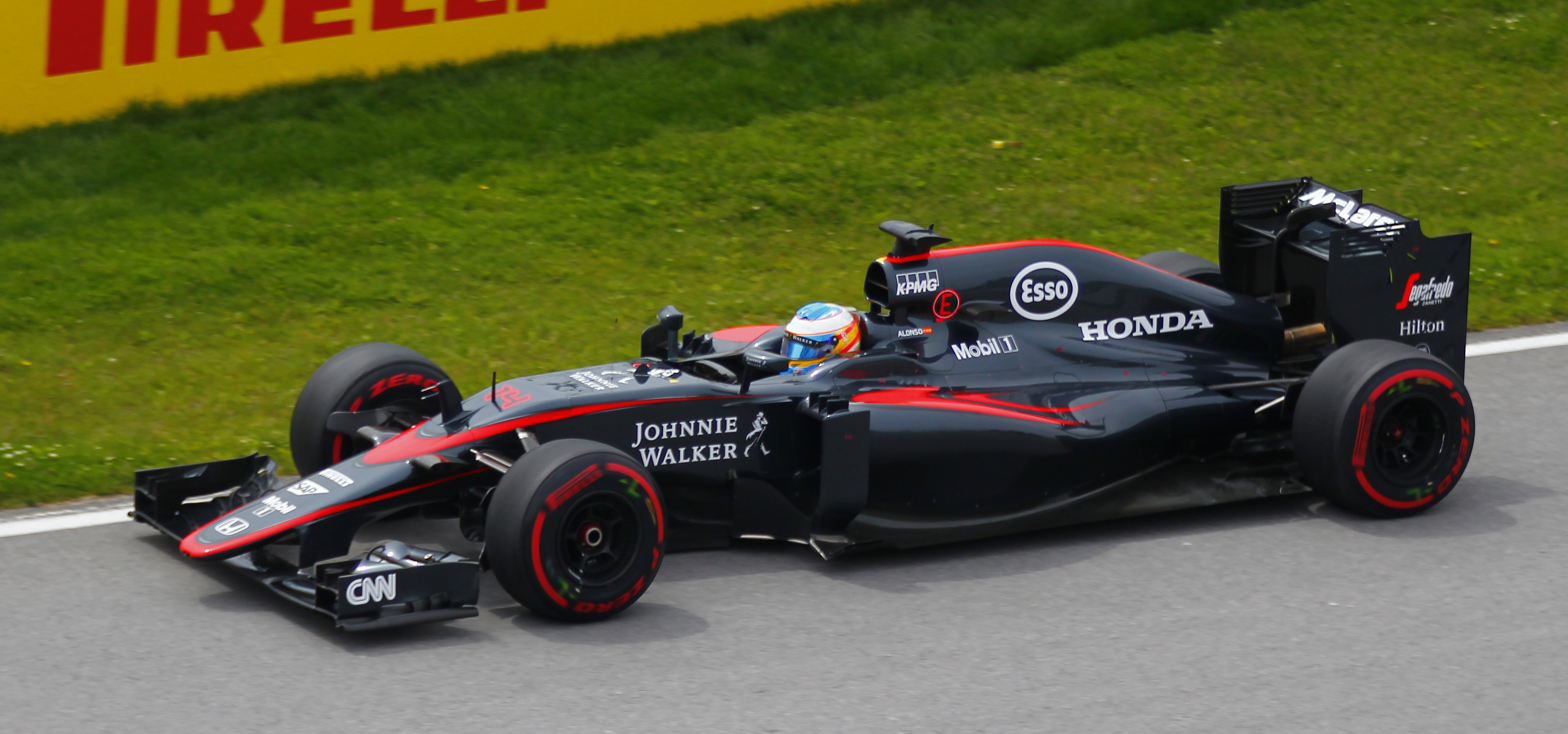
Fernando Alonso driving the McLaren MP4-30 at the 2015 Canadian Grand Prix.

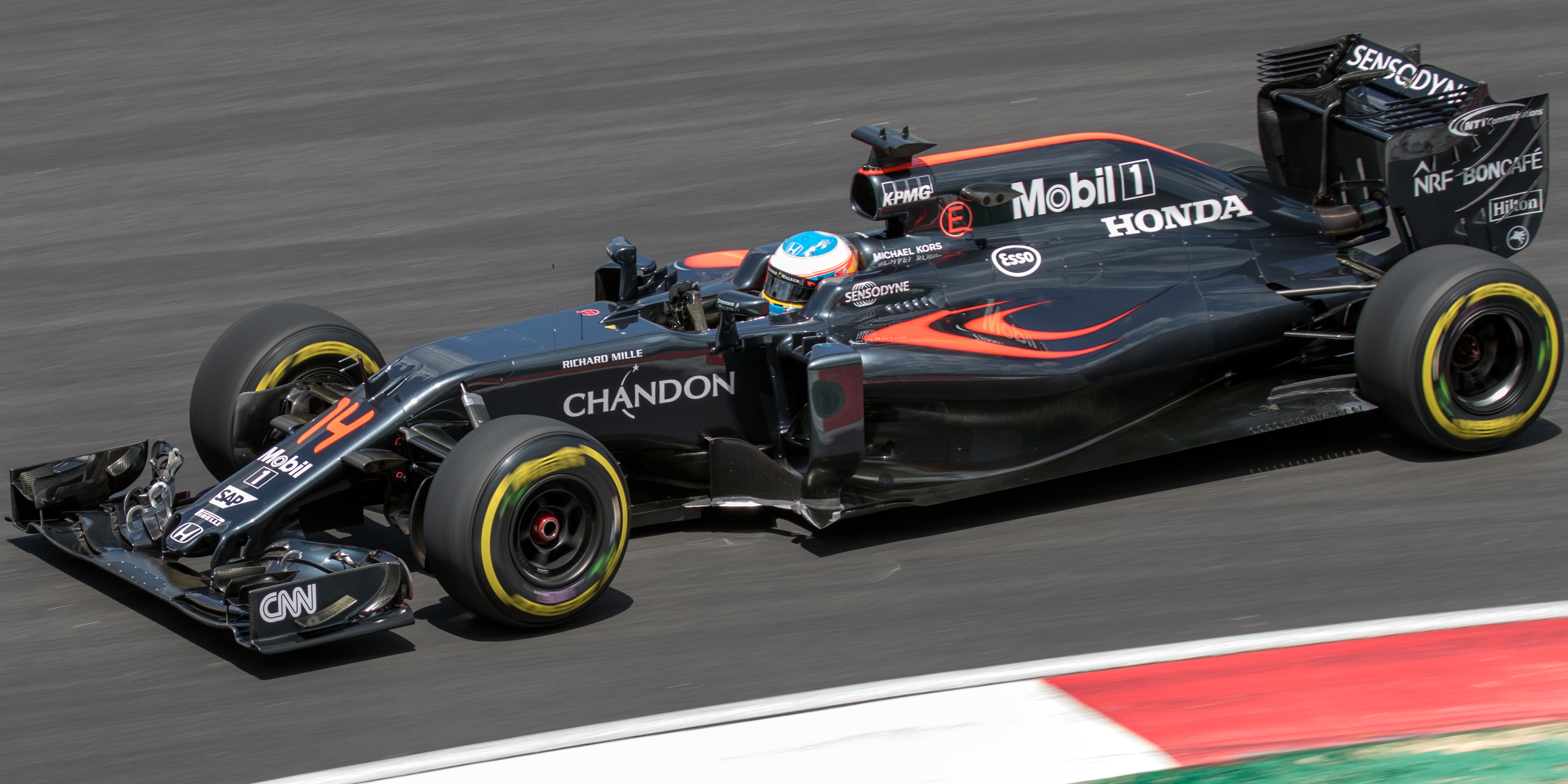
Fernando Alonso driving the McLaren MP4-31 at the 2016 Malaysian Grand Prix.

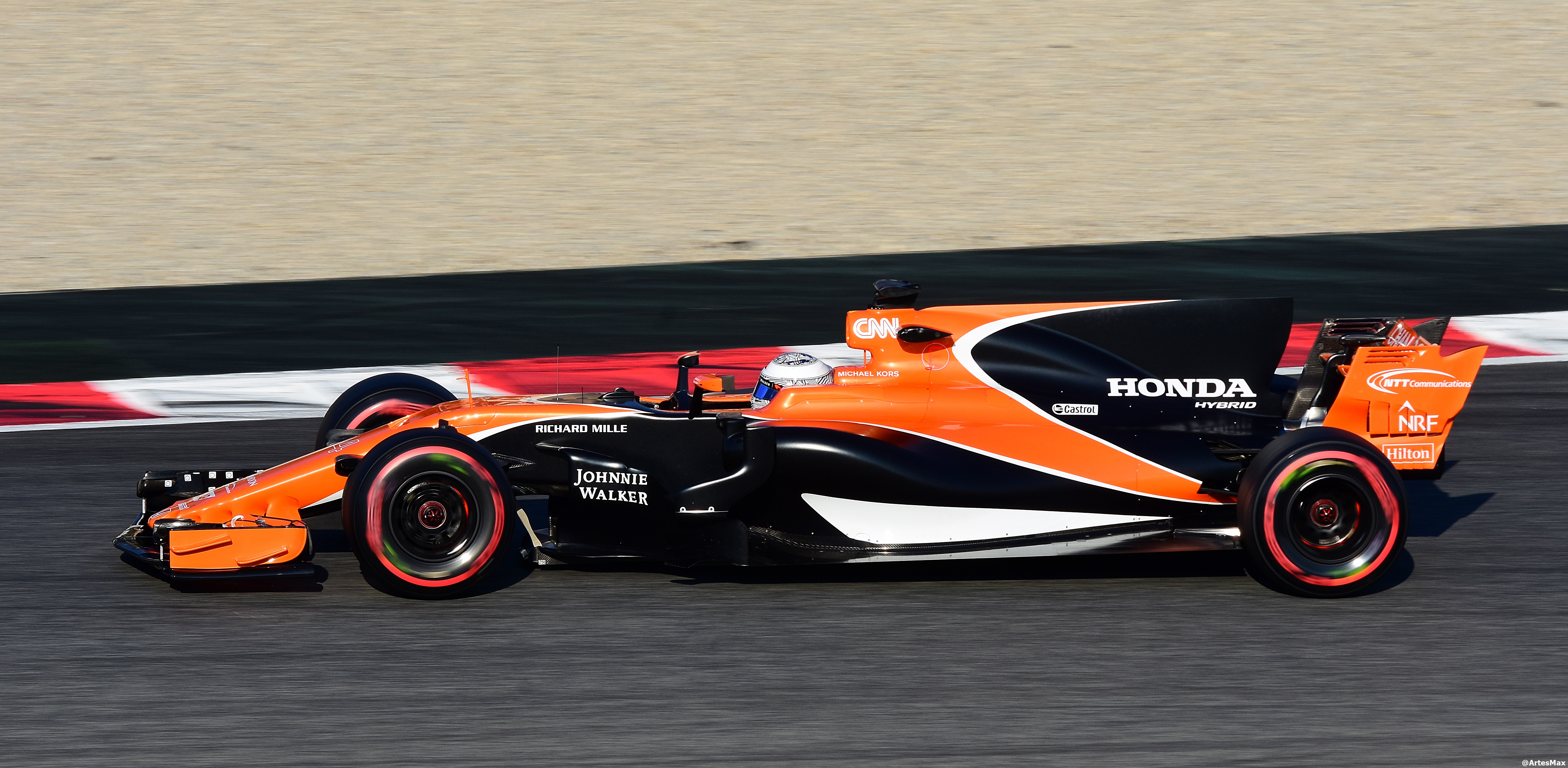
In 2017, McLaren chose to return to an orange livery on the McLaren MCL32, while keeping the black prominent. Fernando Alonso is seen testing the car at the Circuit de Barcelona-Catalunya.

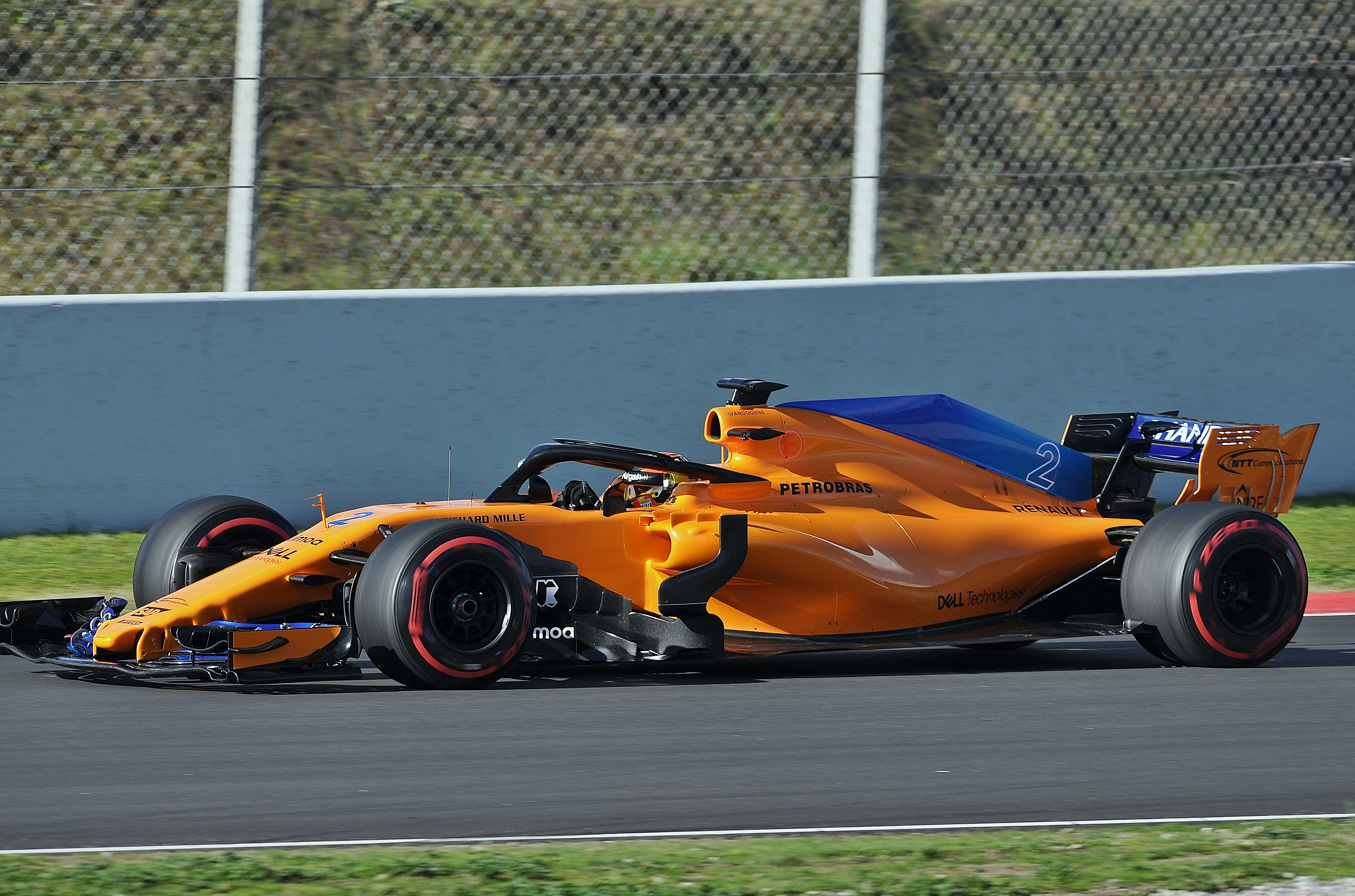
Stoffel Vandoorne driving the McLaren MCL33 during 2018 pre season testing at the Circuit de Barcelona-Catalunya.

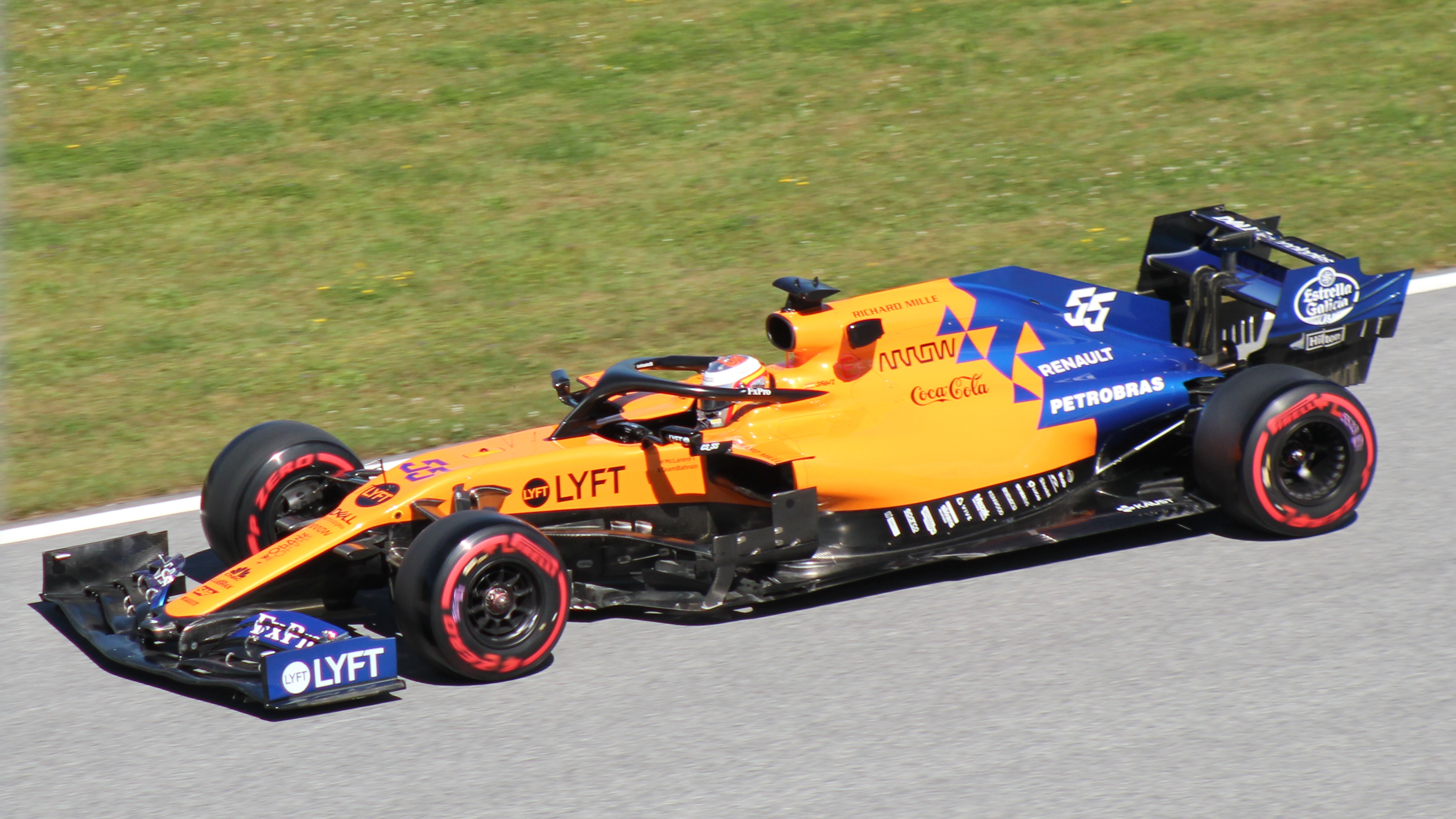
Carlos Sainz Jr. driving the McLaren MCL34 at the 2019 Austrian Grand Prix.

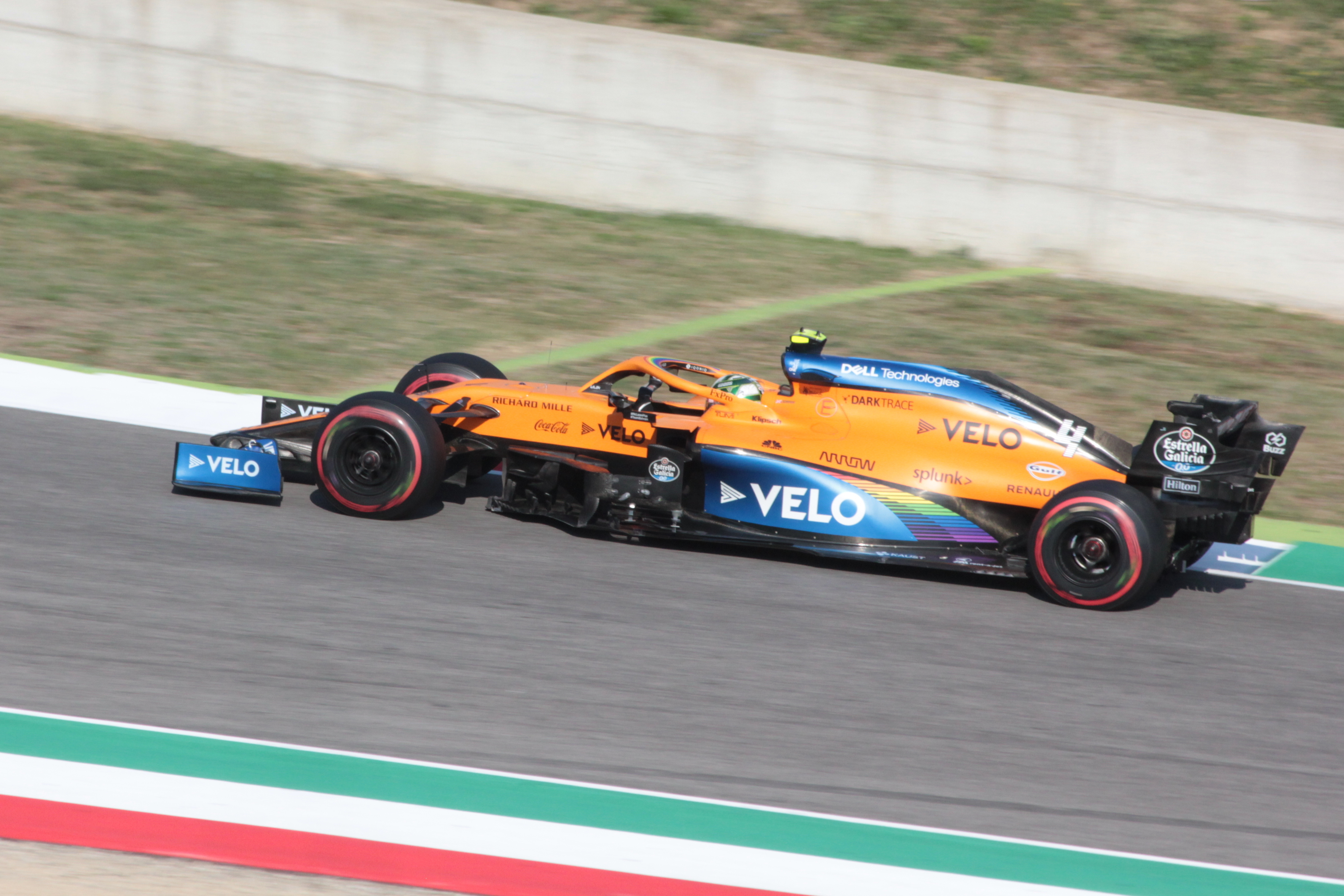
Lando Norris driving the McLaren MCL35 at the 2020 Tuscan Grand Prix. The rainbow graphic, added in support of Formula One's #WeRaceAsOne campaign, is visible on the sidepods.

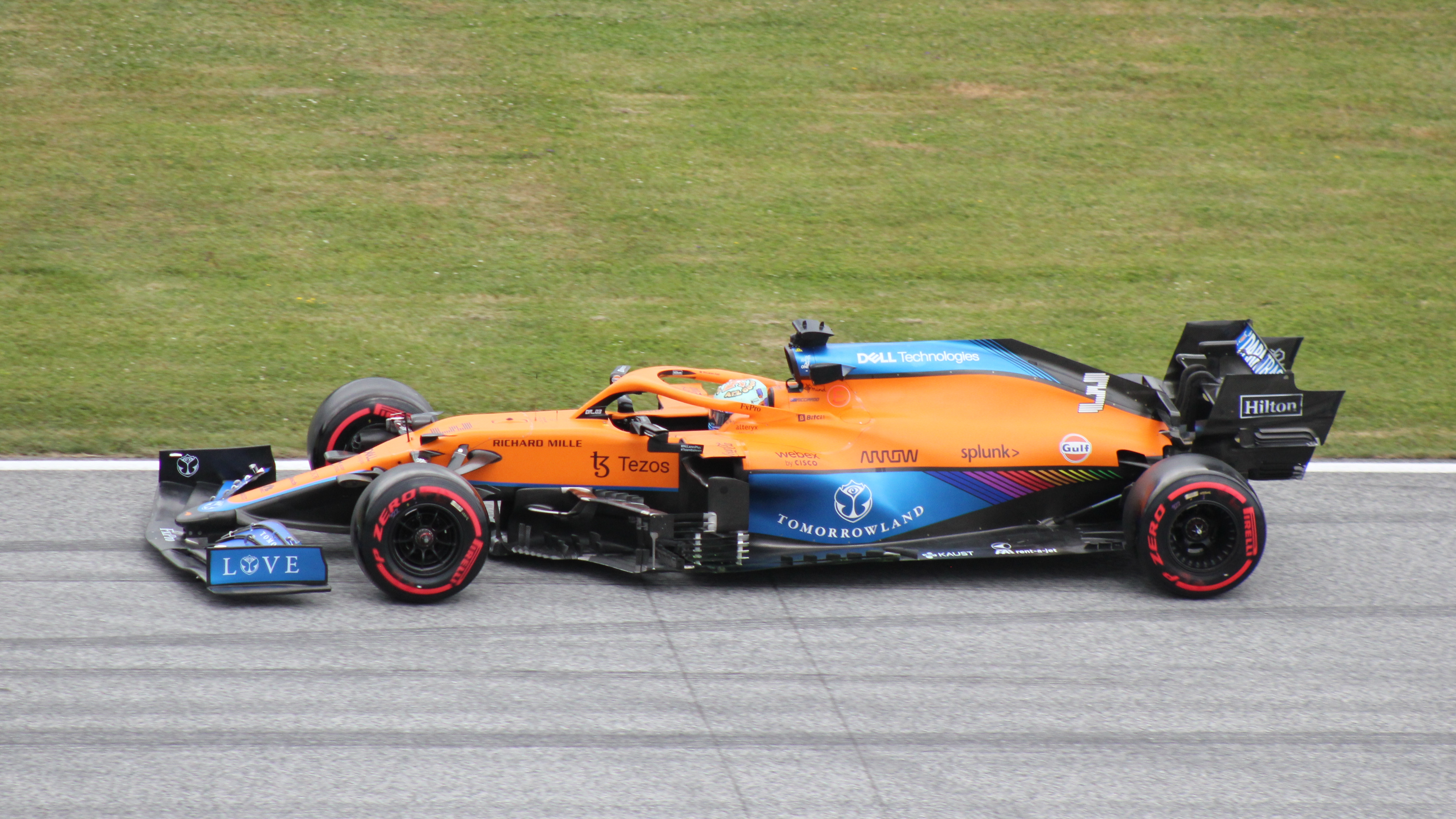
Daniel Ricciardo driving the McLaren MCL35M at the 2021 Austrian Grand Prix.

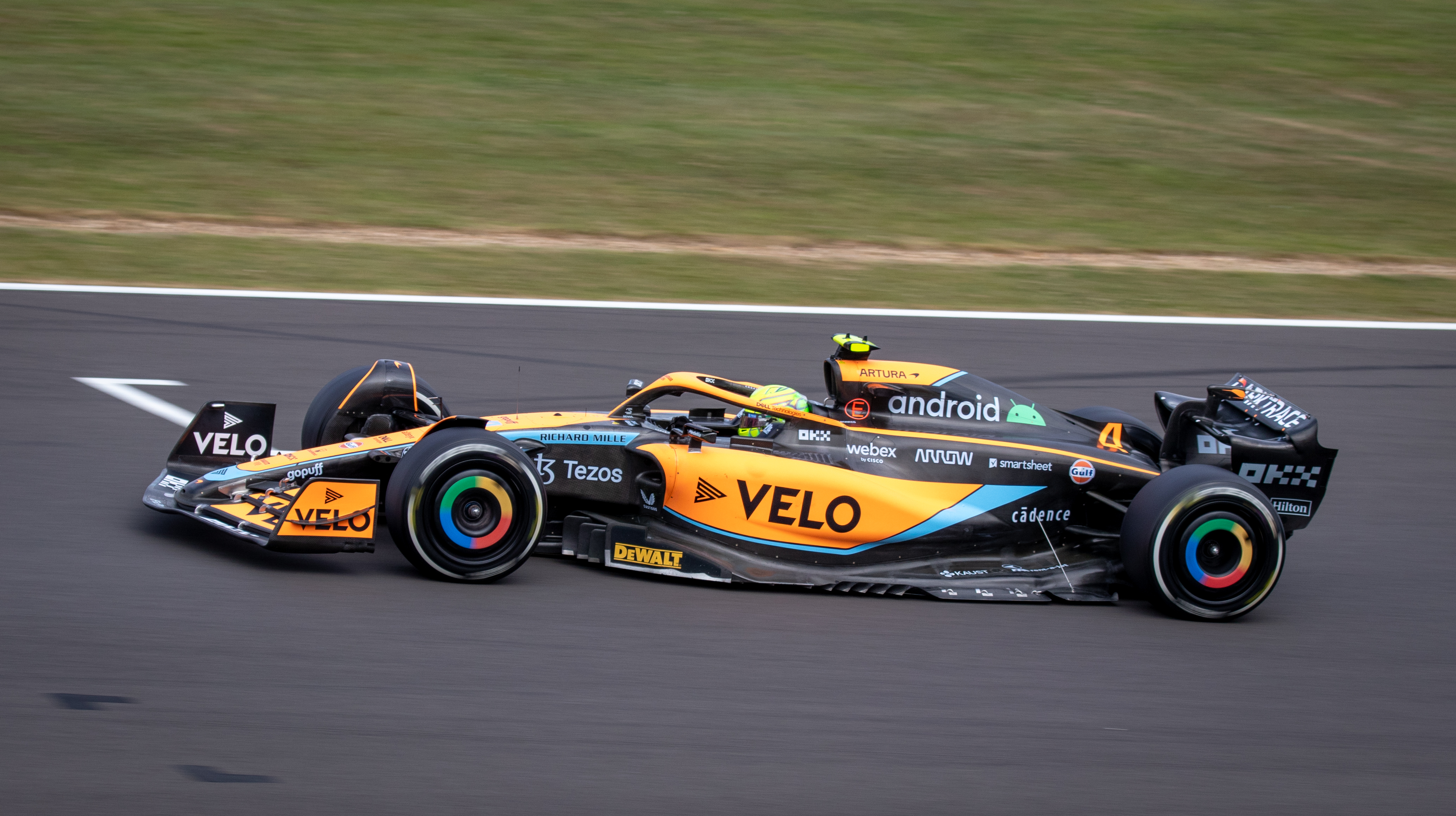
Lando Norris driving the McLaren MCL36 at the 2022 British Grand Prix.

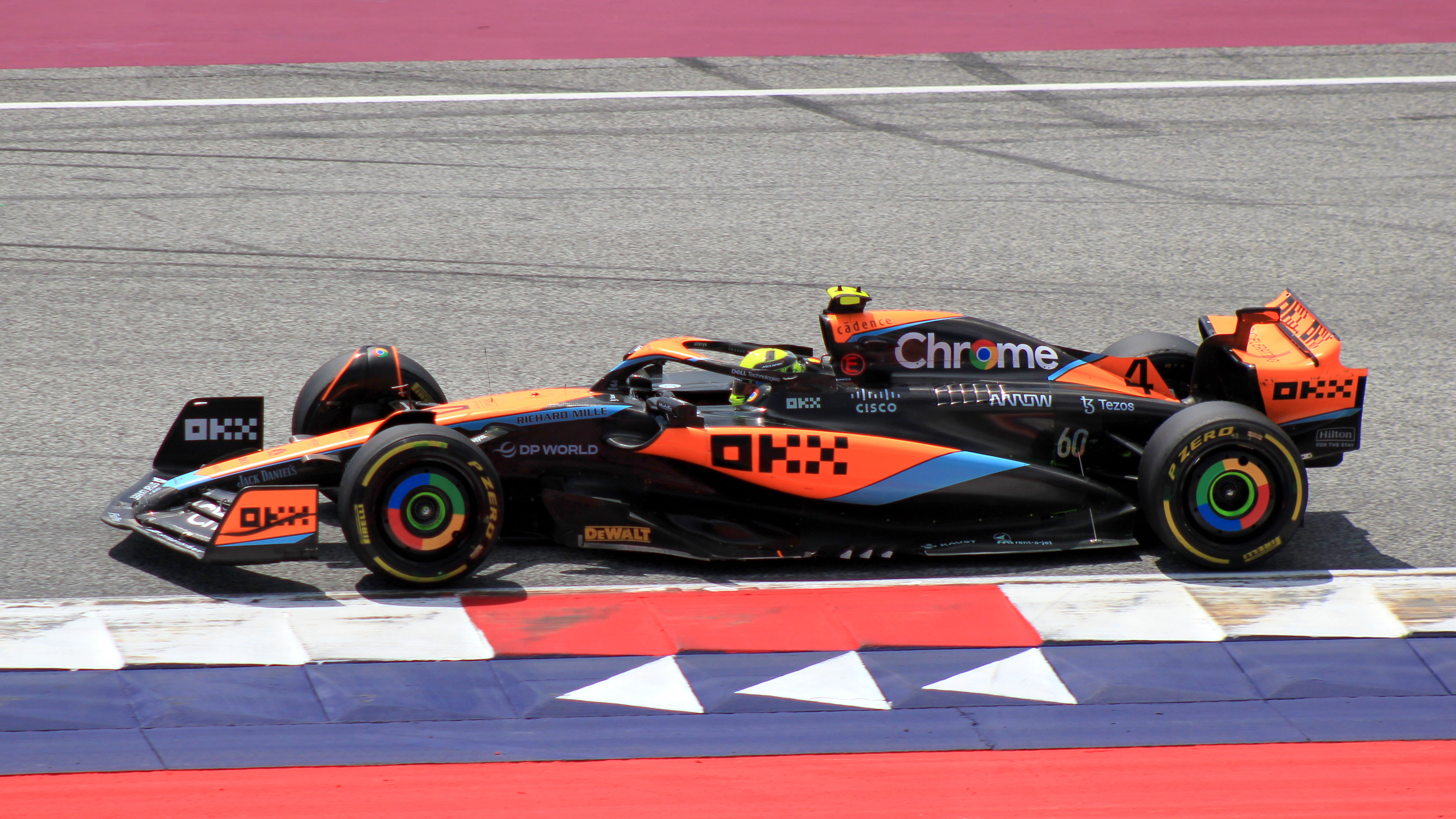
Lando Norris driving the McLaren MCL60 at the 2023 Austrian Grand Prix.

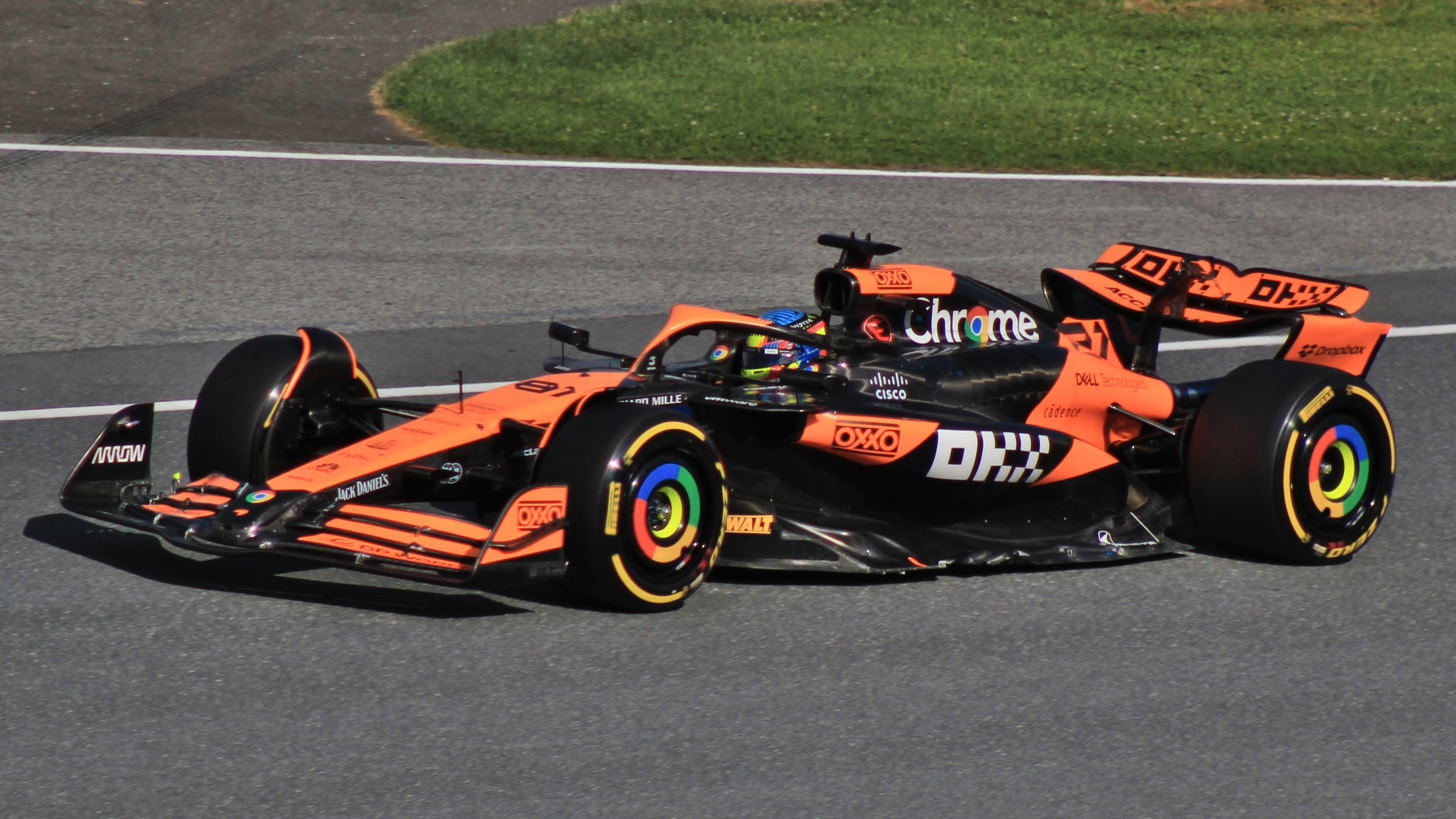
Oscar Piastri driving the McLaren MCL38 at the 2024 Austrian Grand Prix.

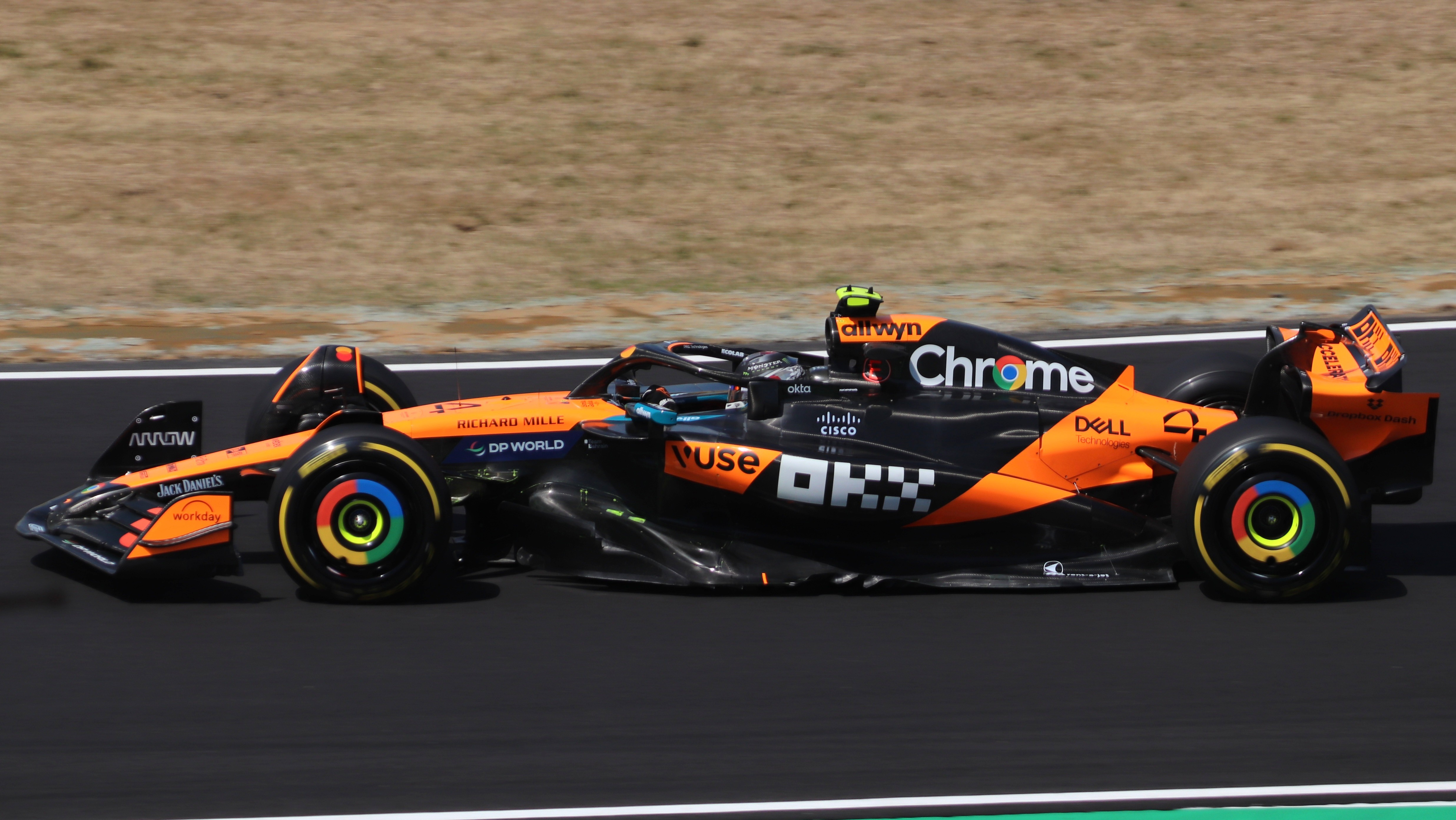
Lando Norris driving the McLaren MCL39 at the 2025 Japanese Grand Prix.

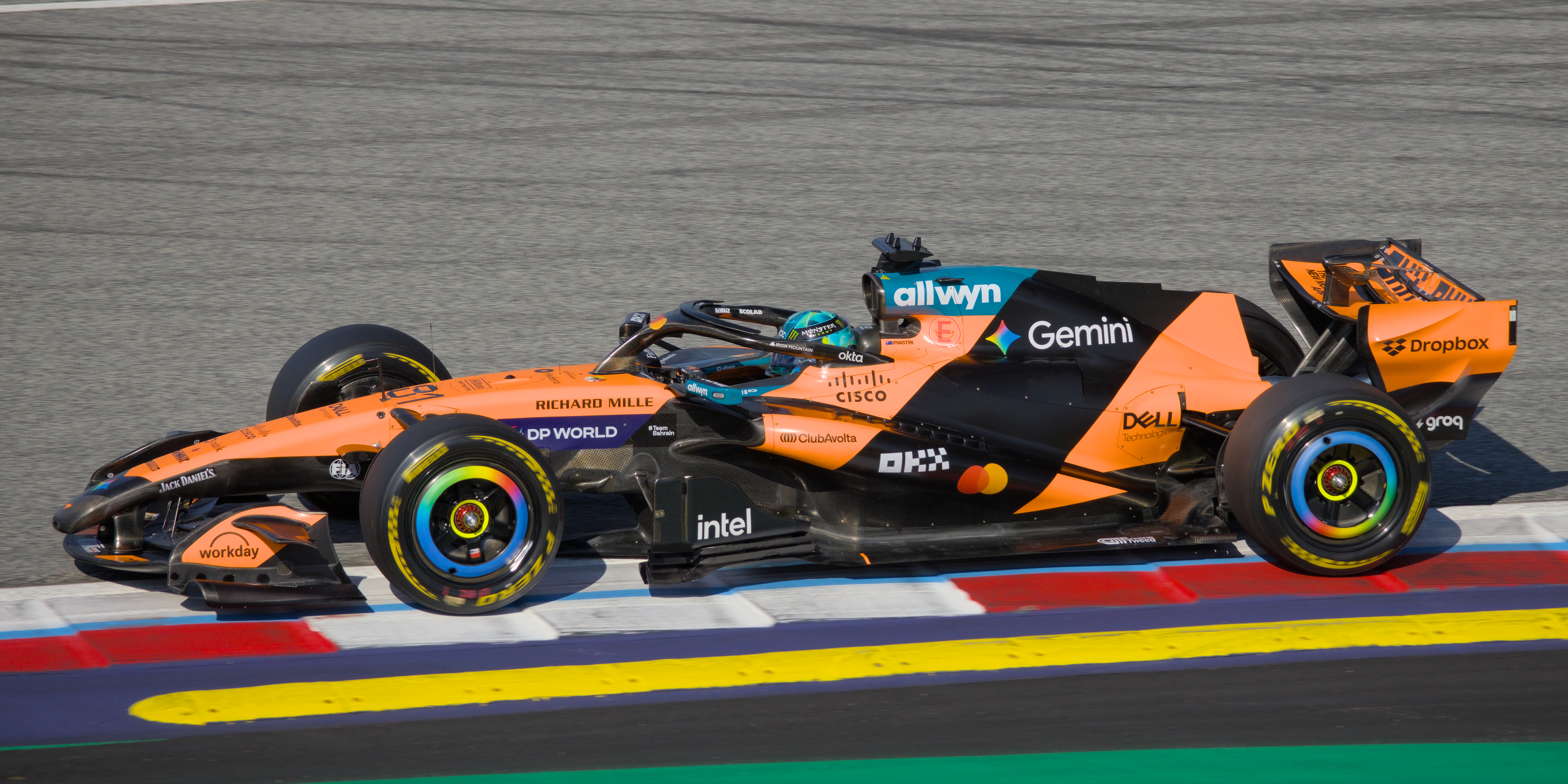
Oscar Piastri driving the McLaren MCL40 at the 2026 Austrian Grand Prix.

== Mercedes-Benz ==
Mercedes-Benz first competed in Formula One during the 1954 and 1955 seasons. This was in the time before sponsorship liveries and the team was using an all silver livery, the national racing color of Germany. The team was absent from Formula One after this, returning in 1994 as an engine supplier.

Mercedes-Benz rejoined Formula One as a team in 2010 after having purchased the Brawn GP team on 16 November 2009. On 21 December 2009 it signed a €30 million per season contract with Petronas as title sponsor. The blueish green livery color of Petronas is just present as fine lines at the side of the car, which overall is mainly painted in silver like historic Mercedes race cars of the 1930s and 1950s. To celebrate their 125th anniversary in motorsport, Mercedes-Benz decided to launch a special one-off livery for the 2019 German Grand Prix. The livery was a homage to the first racing cars that Mercedes made.

Year	Main colour(s)	Additional colour(s)	Main sponsor(s)	Additional major sponsor(s)	Notes
1954–1955	Silver	White			
2010	Silver	Black, Green	Petronas, Mercedes	Bridgestone, Aabar Investments, MIG, Henri Lloyd, Graham, Autonomy	
2011	Silver	Green	Petronas, Mercedes	Aabar, Autonomy, Deutsche Post, MIG Bank, Graham London, Monster Energy, Pirelli	
2012	Silver	Green	Petronas, Mercedes-AMG	Aabar, Deutsche Post, MIG Bank, Monster Energy, Pirelli, Puma	
2013	Silver	Green, Black	Petronas, Mercedes-AMG	BlackBerry, MIG Bank, Monster Energy, Pirelli, Puma	In Malaysia, the team promote Petronas Primax gasoline.
2014	Silver	Green, Black	Petronas, Mercedes-AMG	BlackBerry, Monster Energy, Pirelli, Swissquote Bank, Puma	In Malaysia, the team promote Petronas Primax gasoline.
2015	Silver	Green, Black	Petronas, Mercedes-AMG	BlackBerry, Monster Energy, Pirelli, Puma, Hugo Boss, Epson, Qualcomm	In Malaysia, the team promote Petronas Primax gasoline.
2016	Silver	Green, Black	Petronas, Mercedes-AMG	Monster Energy, Pirelli, Puma, Hugo Boss, Epson, Qualcomm, IWC	In Malaysia, the team promote Petronas Primax gasoline.
2017	Silver	Green, Black	Petronas, Mercedes-AMG	Monster Energy, Pirelli, Puma, Hugo Boss, Epson, Qualcomm	
2018	Silver	Green, Black	Petronas, Mercedes-AMG	UBS, Qualcomm, Epson, Bose, Tommy Hilfiger, Pirelli, Puma, Monster Energy, IWC	
2019	Silver	Green, Black	Petronas, Mercedes-AMG	UBS, Qualcomm, Epson, Bose, Tommy Hilfiger, Pirelli, Puma, IWC Schaffhausen, Marriott Bonvoy, Monster Energy, CrowdStrike, TIBCO, Pure Storage, Tata Communications, ebmpapst, OMP Racing, Axalta, ASSOS, OZ Racing, Brembo, Endless Brake Technology, Seedlip	During the Monaco round of the championship, the team, memorialising three-time champion and team key member Niki Lauda, who had died less than a week prior to the race, painted their halos red and included a message reading "Danke Niki" on the nosecone and a red version of the Mercedes three-pointed star on the engine cover (the latter would be kept for the rest of the season and would appear on future cars). During the German Grand Prix, the team raced with a one-off livery to celebrate their 125th anniversary in motorsport.
2020	Black	Green, Red	Petronas, Mercedes-AMG	AMD, Ineos, Epson, CrowdStrike, Pirelli, Tommy Hilfiger, IWC Schaffhausen	During the pre-season testing usual silver livery was used. In Abu Dhabi in honour of the seventh Constructors' Cup win, the livery featured names of each worker of the team.
2021	Black	Green, Red	Petronas, Mercedes-AMG	AMD, Ineos, Epson, Pirelli, Tommy Hilfiger, IWC Schaffhausen, TeamViewer, CrowdStrike, FTX, Kingspan	For all Italian rounds (Emilia Romagna, Monza), Petronas promotes their Syntium fuels instead. For all races in June, starting with the 2023 Spanish Grand Prix, the Mercedes logo on the nose was changed to a rainbow star. The team raced with a black ring around the roll hoop at the 2022 Italian Grand Prix to mourn the death of Elizabeth II. For the 2024 Singapore Grand Prix, Mercedes ran a special livery celebrating the 50th anniversary of Petronas. For Lewis Hamilton's final race at Mercedes, the 2024 Abu Dhabi Grand Prix, numerous fans submitted their names to be featured on the car.
2022	Silver	Green, Red	Petronas, Mercedes-AMG	AMD, Ineos, Pirelli, Tommy Hilfiger, IWC Schaffhausen, TeamViewer, CrowdStrike, Kingspan, FTX, Akkodis	
2023	Black	Green, Silver	Petronas, Mercedes-AMG	AMD, Ineos, Pirelli, IWC Schaffhausen, TeamViewer, CrowdStrike, Akkodis, Solera Holdings, Qualcomm Snapdragon, Einhell, G42, Nuvei	
2024–2025	Black	Green, Silver	Petronas, Mercedes-AMG	AMD, Ineos, Pirelli, IWC Schaffhausen, TeamViewer, CrowdStrike, Akkodis, Solera Holdings, Qualcomm Snapdragon, Einhell, G42, SAP, Signify, Adidas (2025)	
2026	Silver, Black	Green	Petronas, Mercedes-AMG	AMD, Ineos, Pirelli, IWC Schaffhausen, TeamViewer, CrowdStrike, Akkodis, Solera Holdings, Qualcomm Snapdragon, Einhell, G42, SAP, Signify, Microsoft, Nubank, Marriott Bonvoy, Adidas, Vercel	For the Japanese Grand Prix, a custom front wing design was utilised.

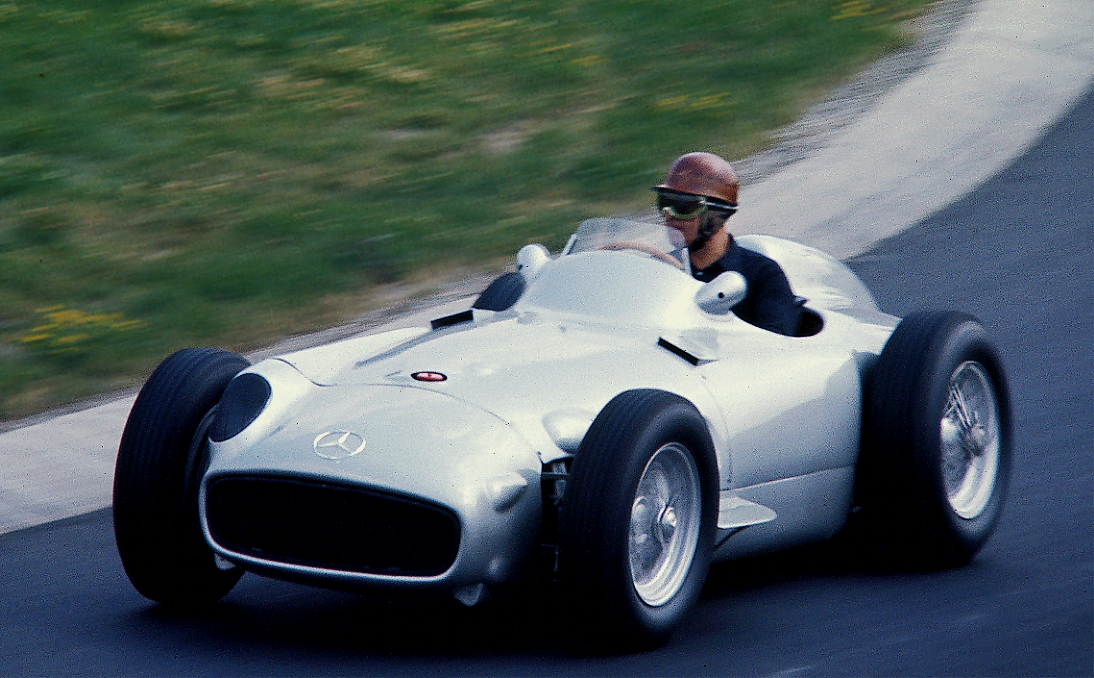
Karl Kling at the wheel of the W196 at Nürburgring.

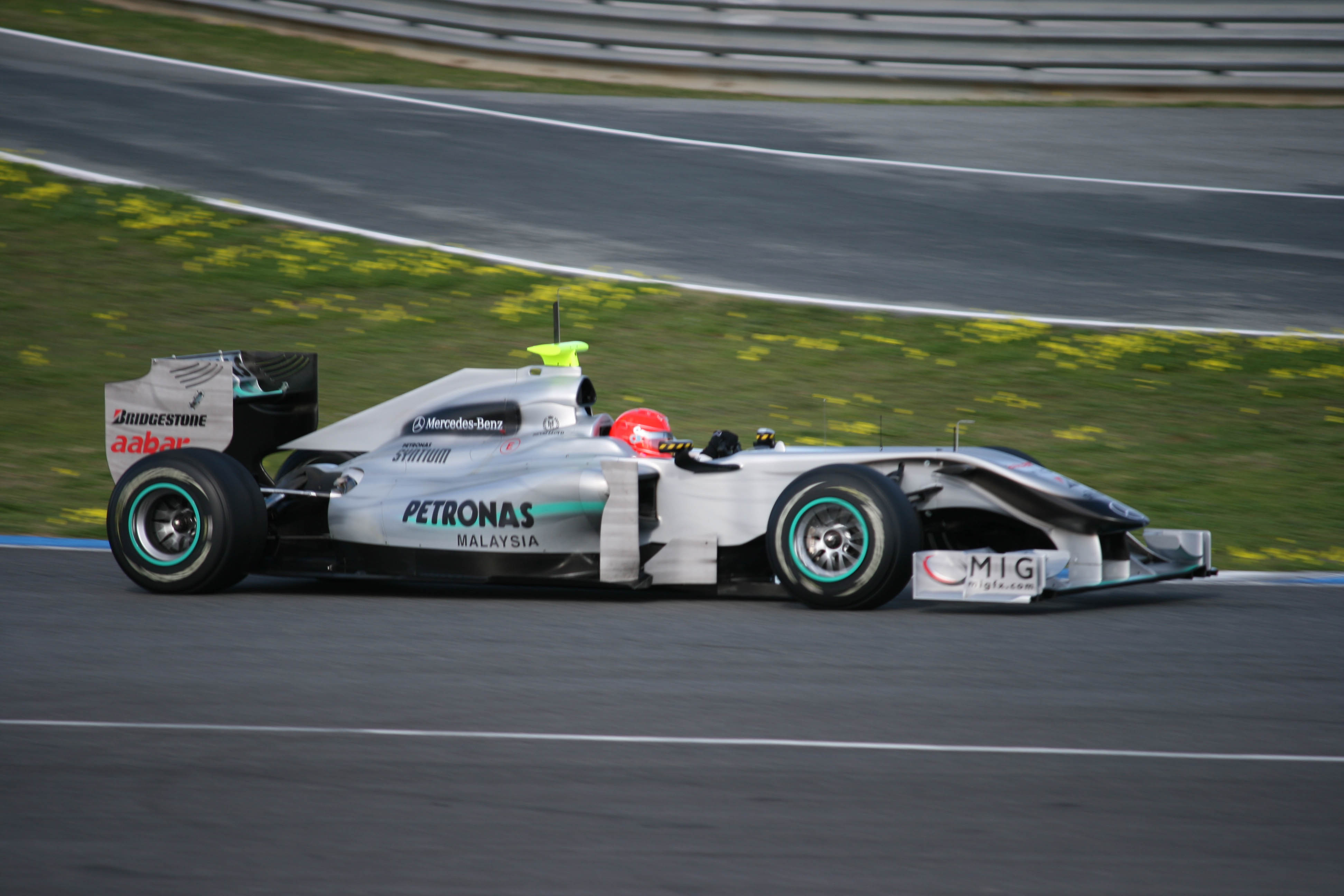
Michael Schumacher testing the Mercedes MGP W01 for Mercedes GP at Jerez, February 2010.

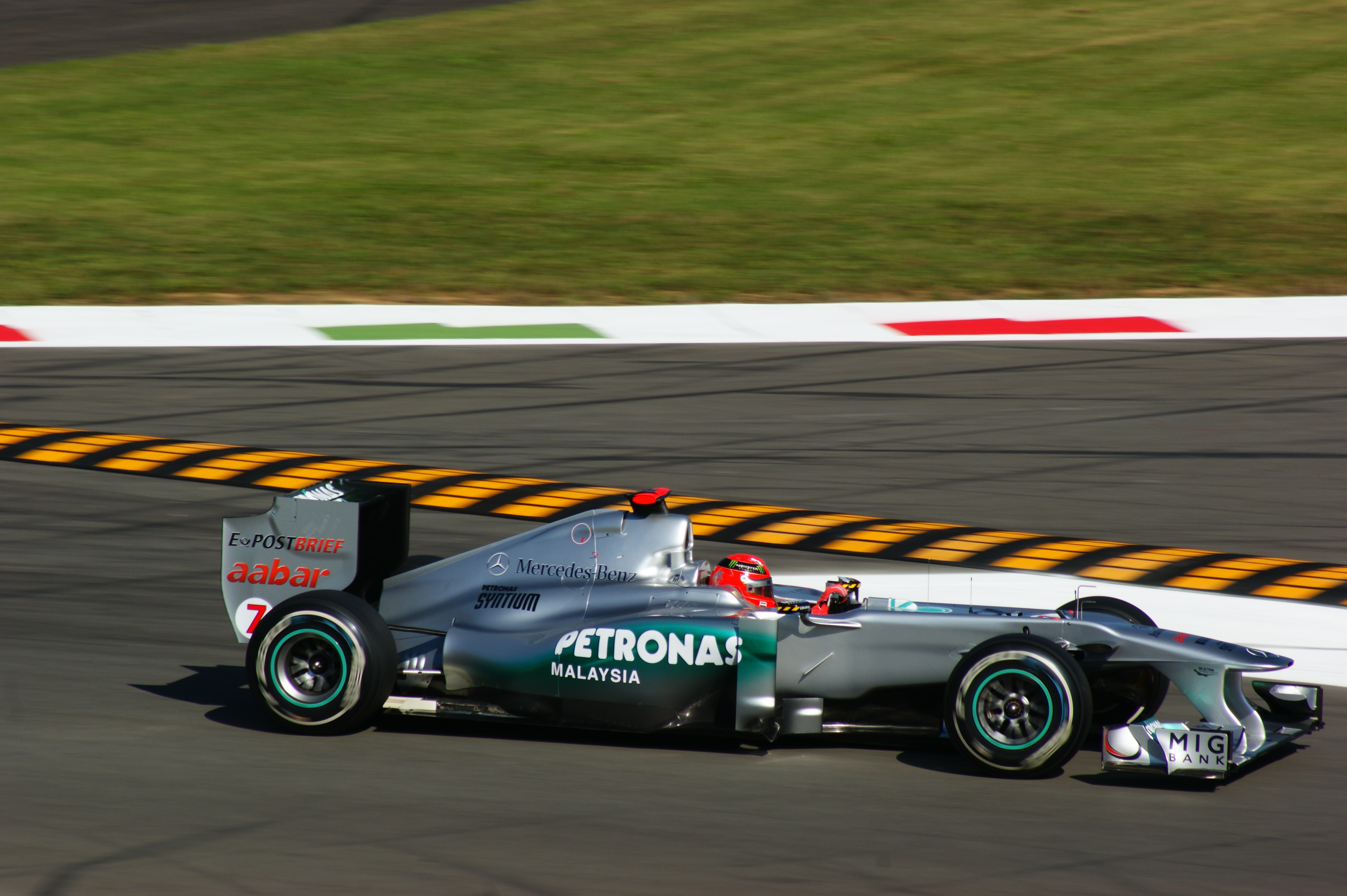
Michael Schumacher driving Mercedes MGP W02 at the 2011 Italian Grand Prix.

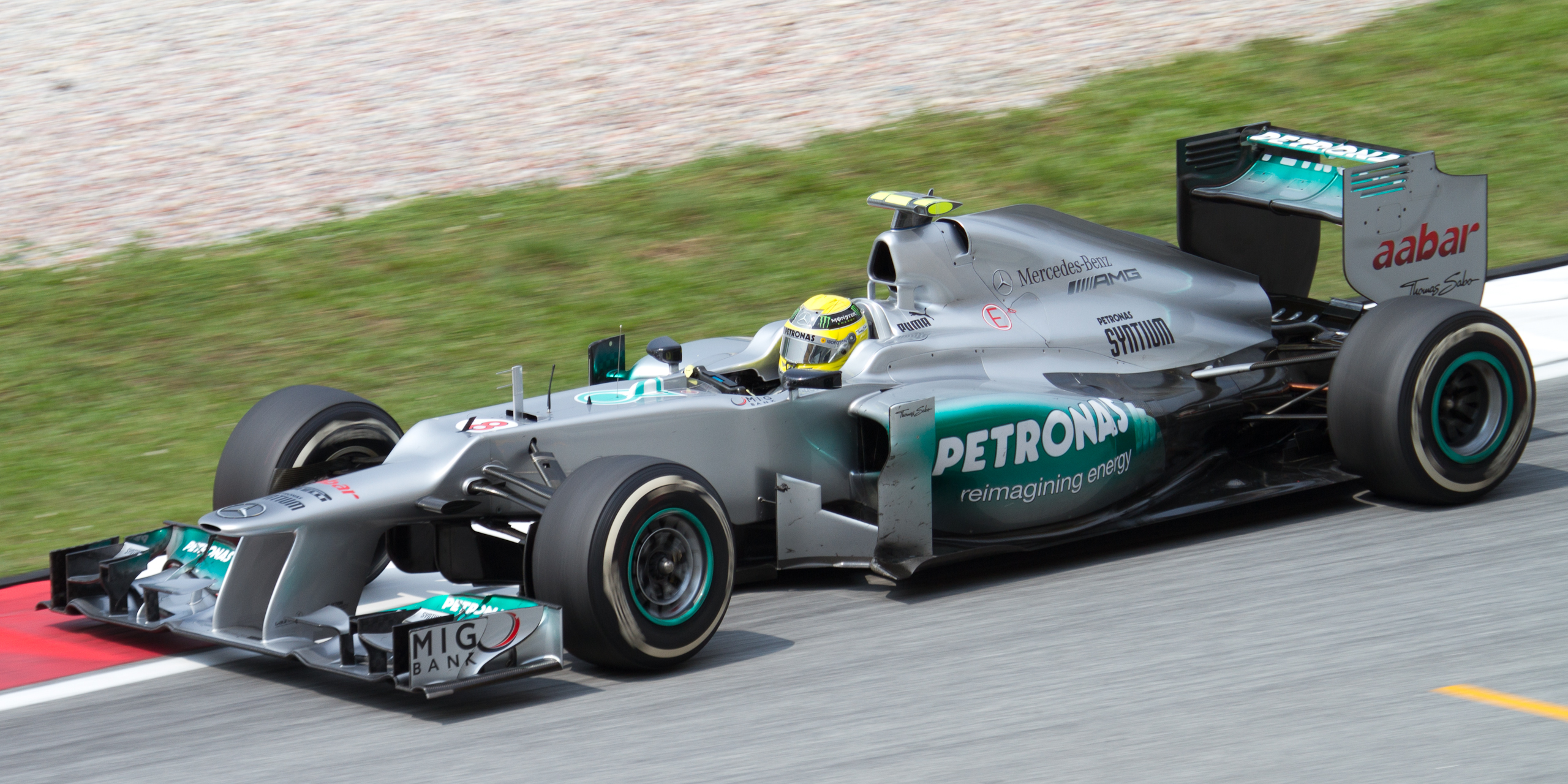
Nico Rosberg driving the Mercedes F1 W03 at the 2012 Malaysian Grand Prix.

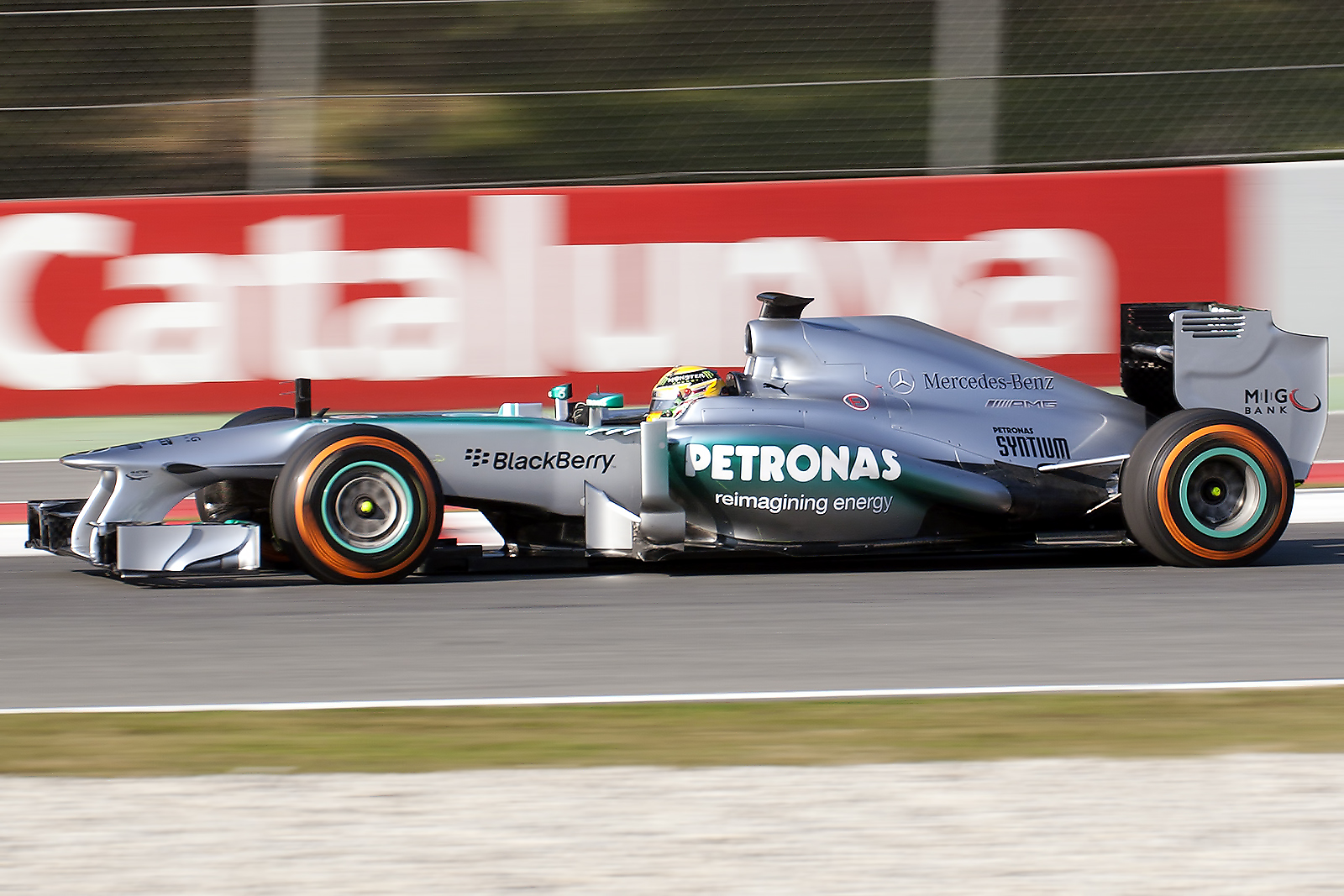
Lewis Hamilton driving the Mercedes F1 W04 at the 2013 Barcelona pre season test.

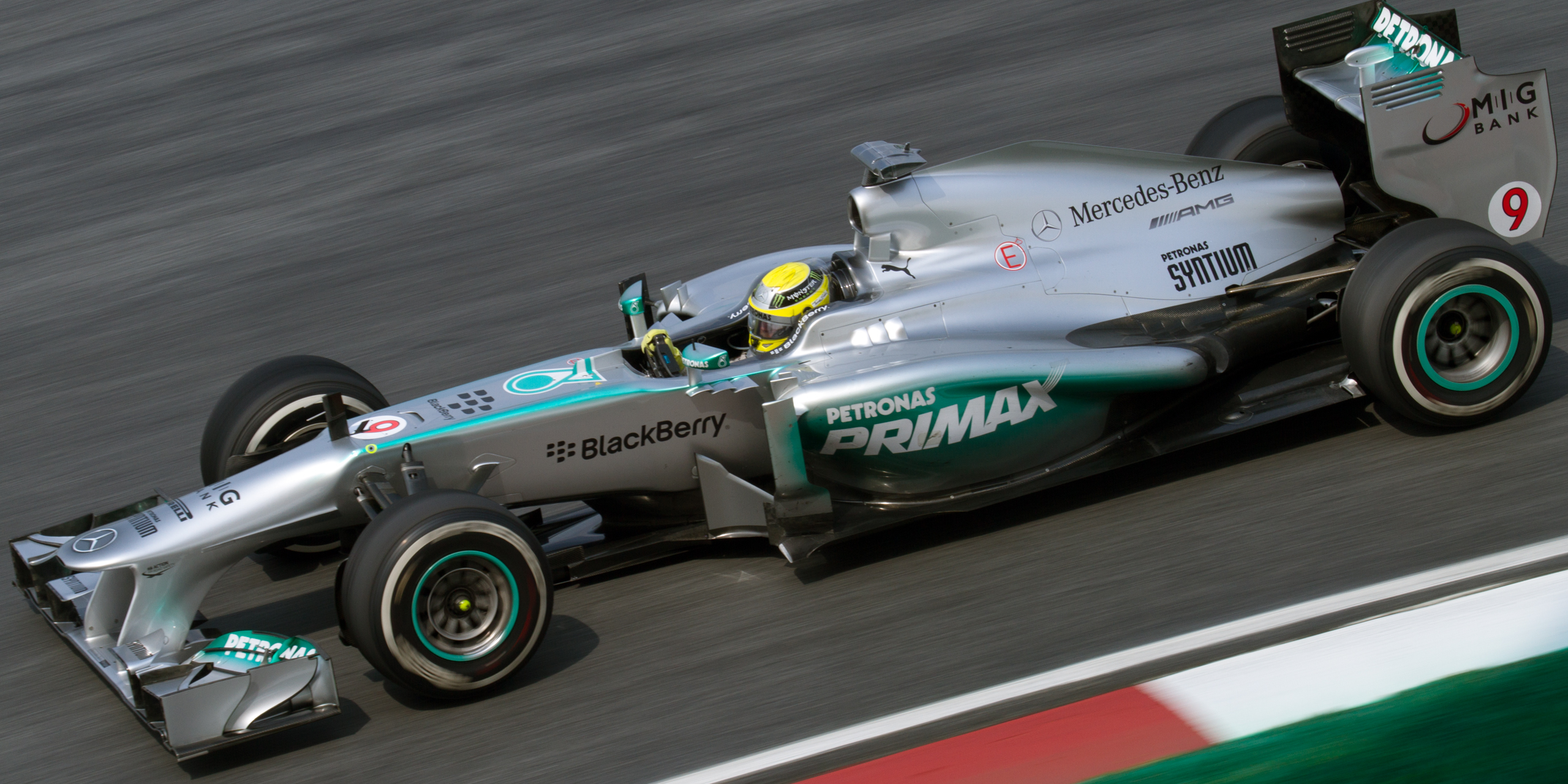
Nico Rosberg in Mercedes F1 W04 with Petronas Primax branding.

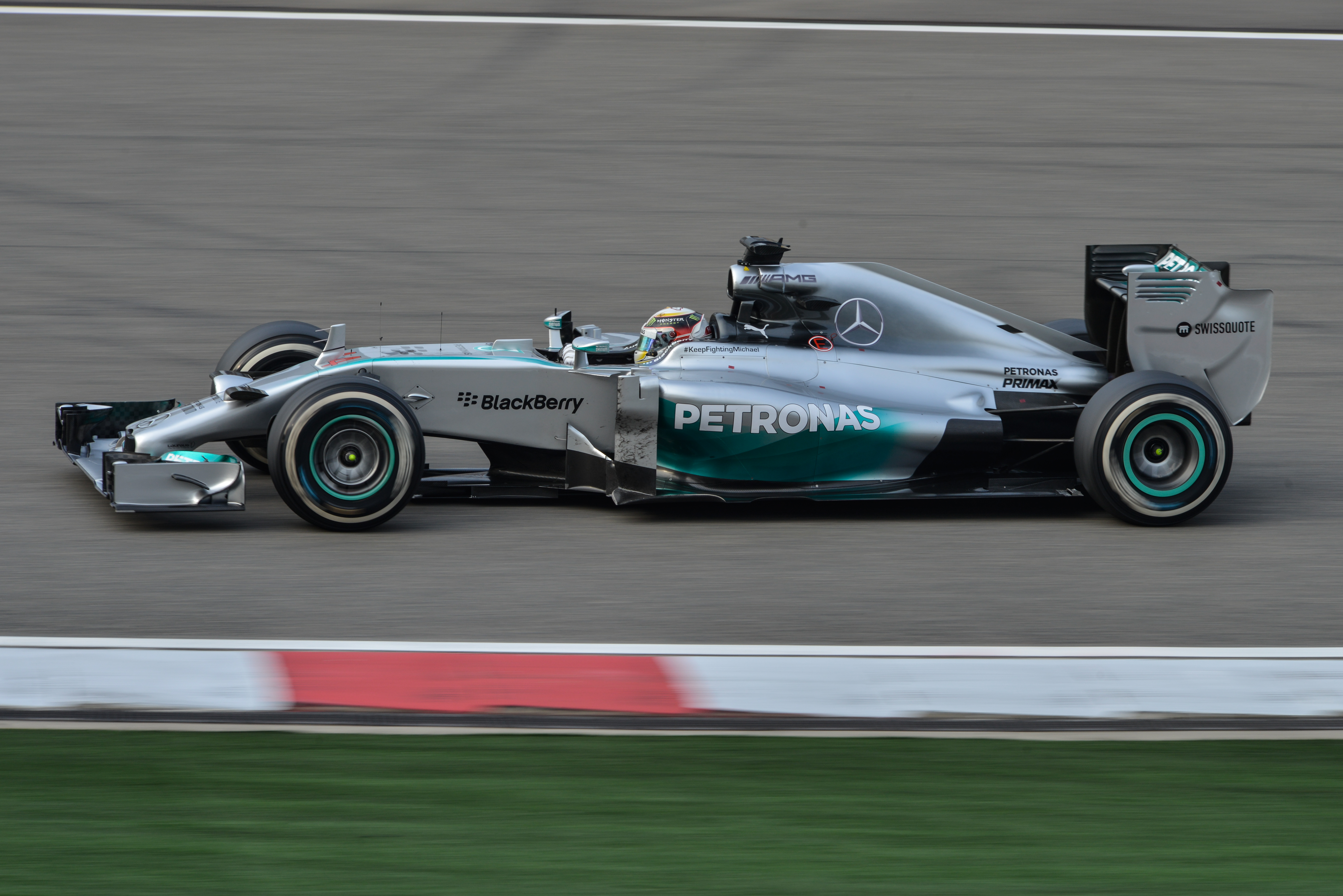
Lewis Hamilton driving the Mercedes F1 W05 Hybrid at the 2014 Chinese Grand Prix.

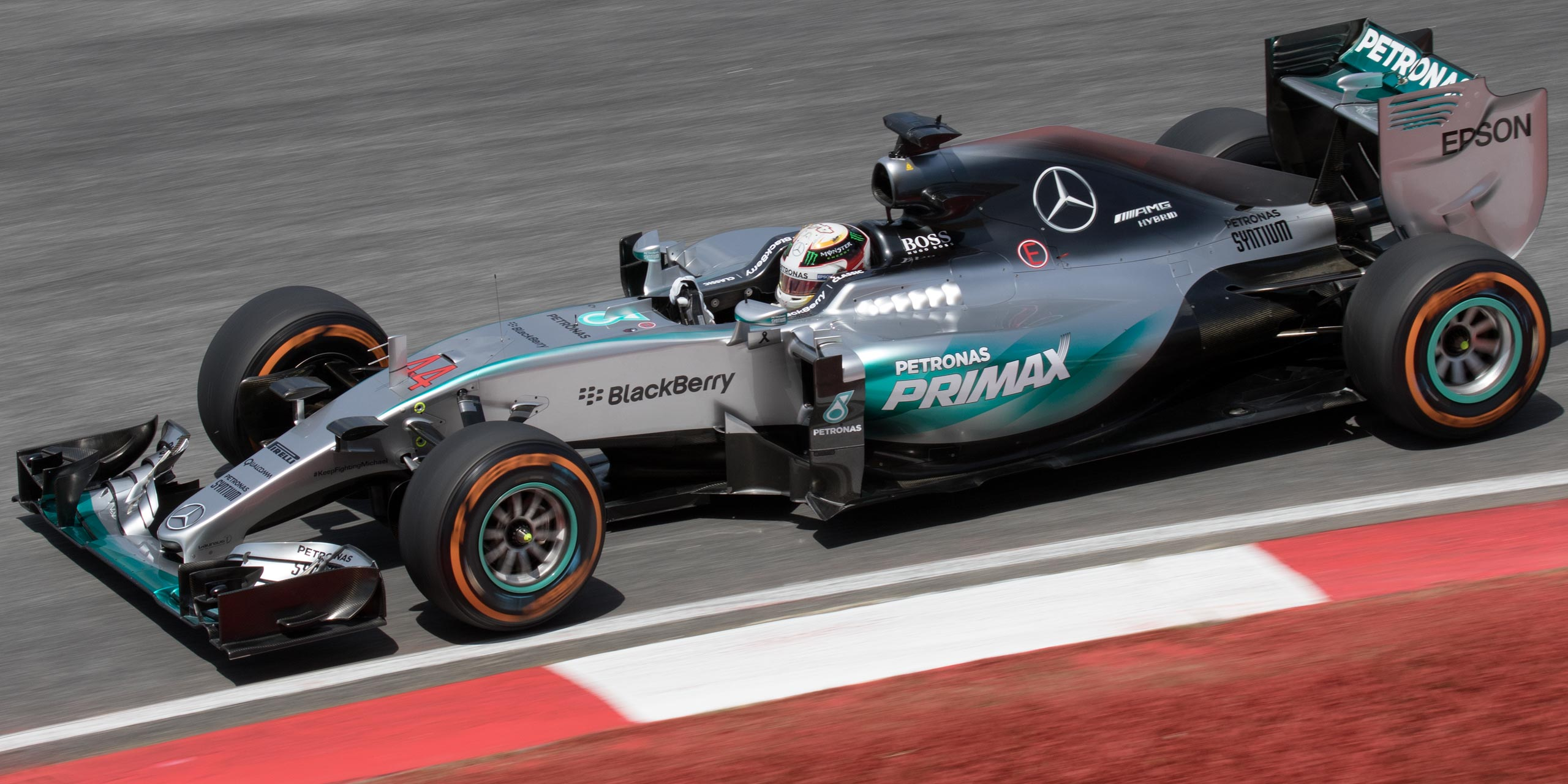
Lewis Hamilton driving the Mercedes F1 W06 Hybrid at the 2015 Malaysian Grand Prix.

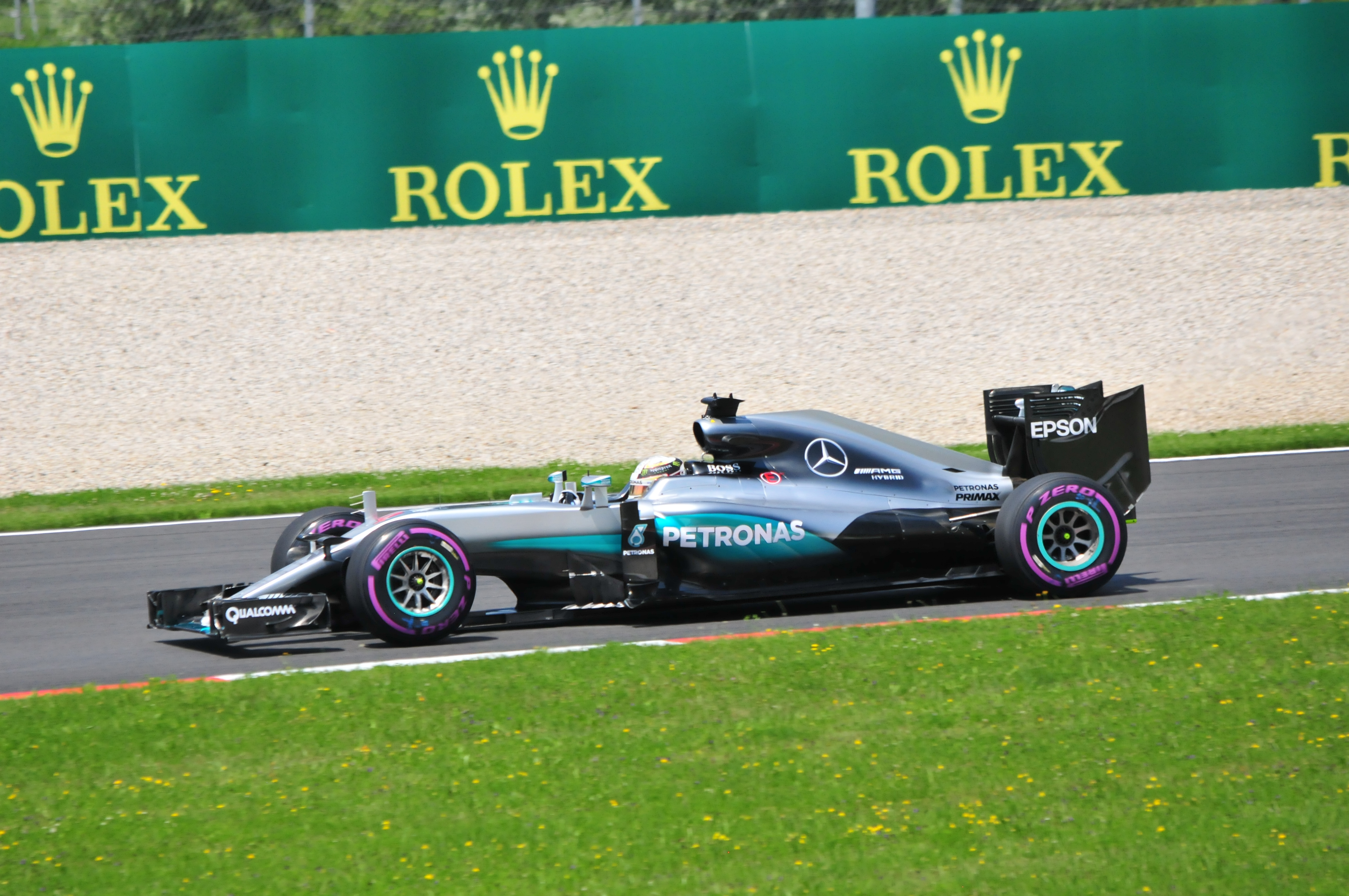
Lewis Hamilton driving the Mercedes F1 W07 Hybrid at the 2016 Austrian Grand Prix.

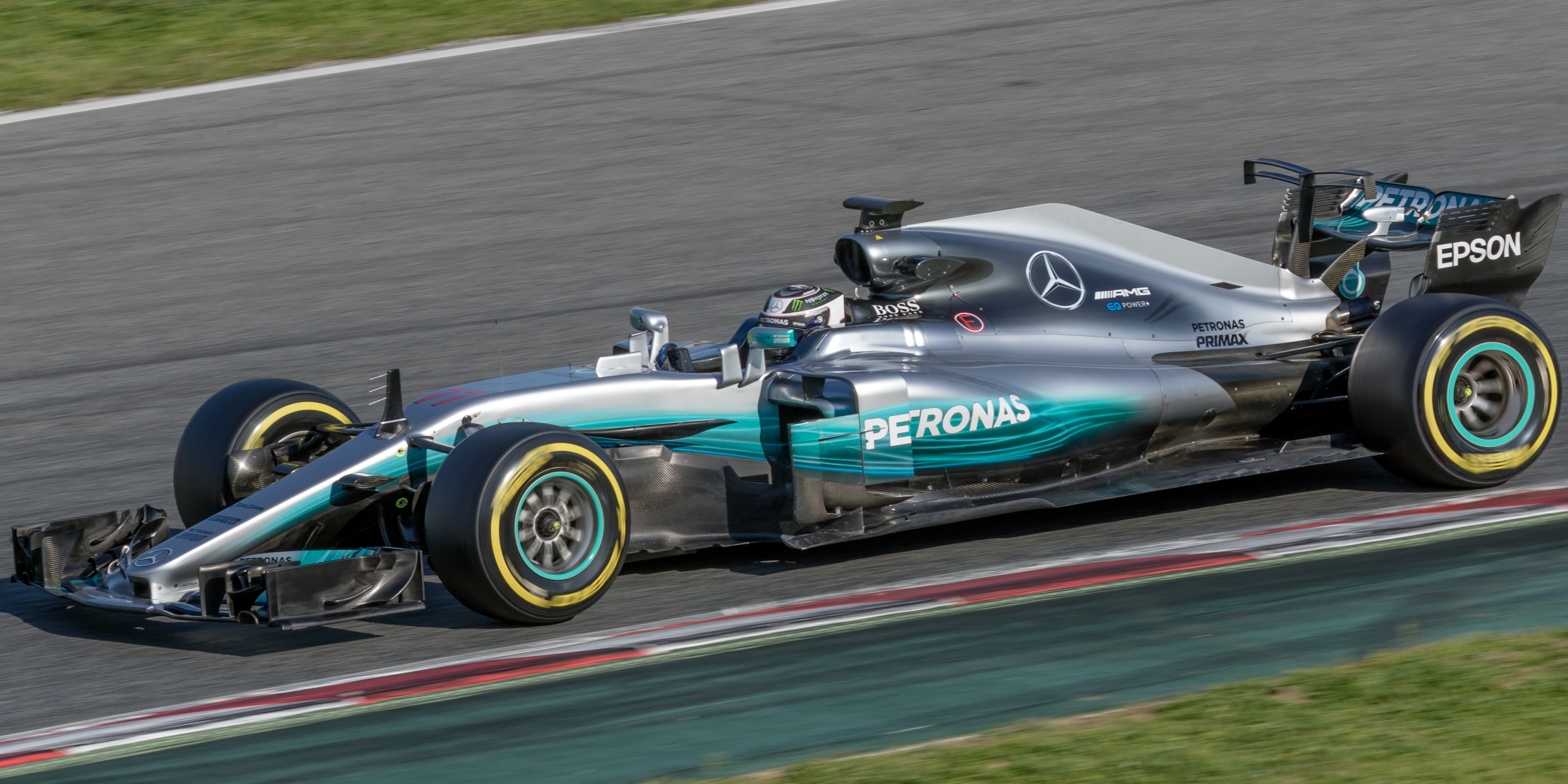
Valtteri Bottas driving the Mercedes AMG F1 W08 EQ Power+ at the 2017 Barcelona pre season test.

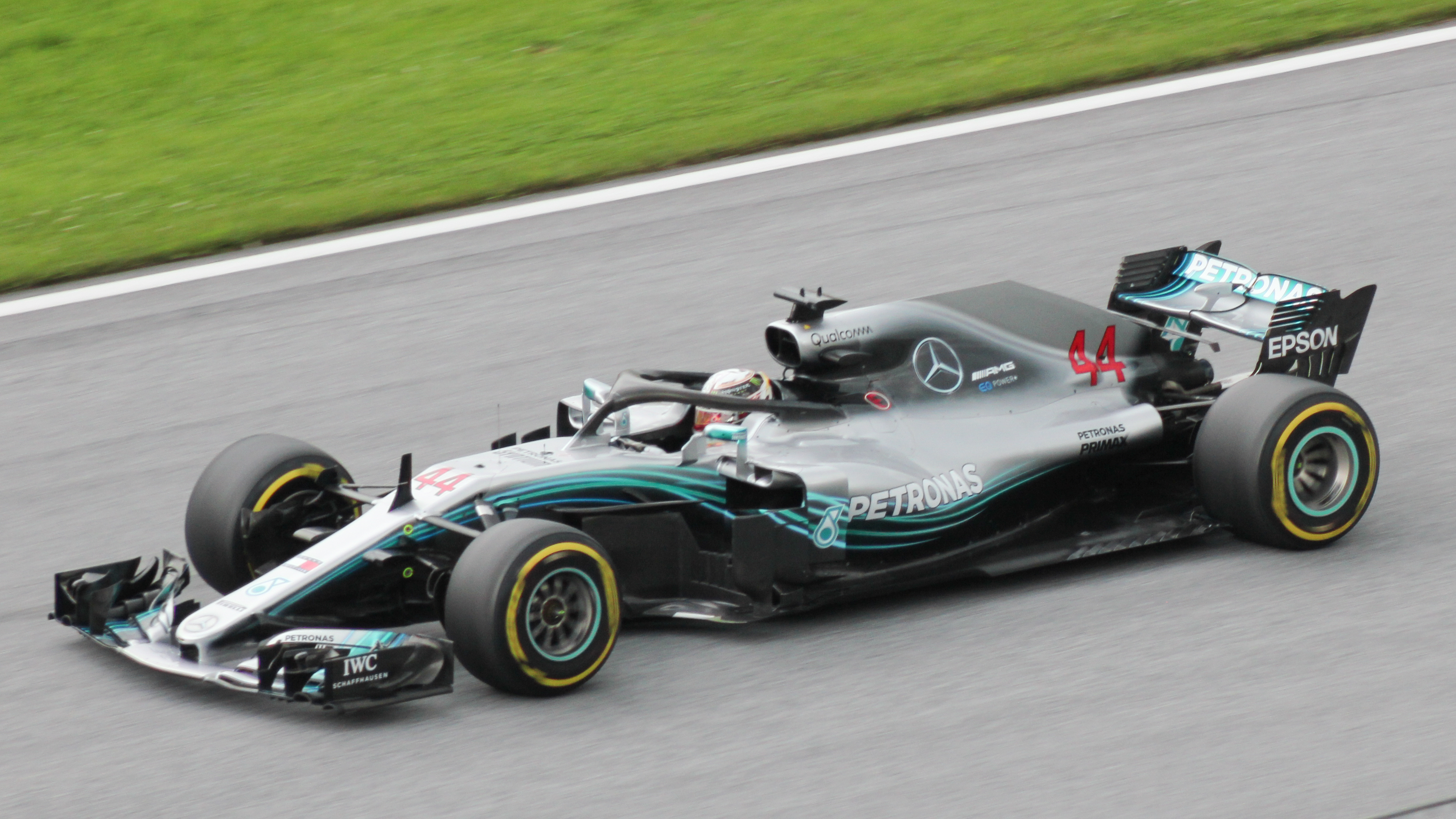
Lewis Hamilton driving the Mercedes AMG F1 W09 EQ Power+ at the 2018 Austrian Grand Prix.

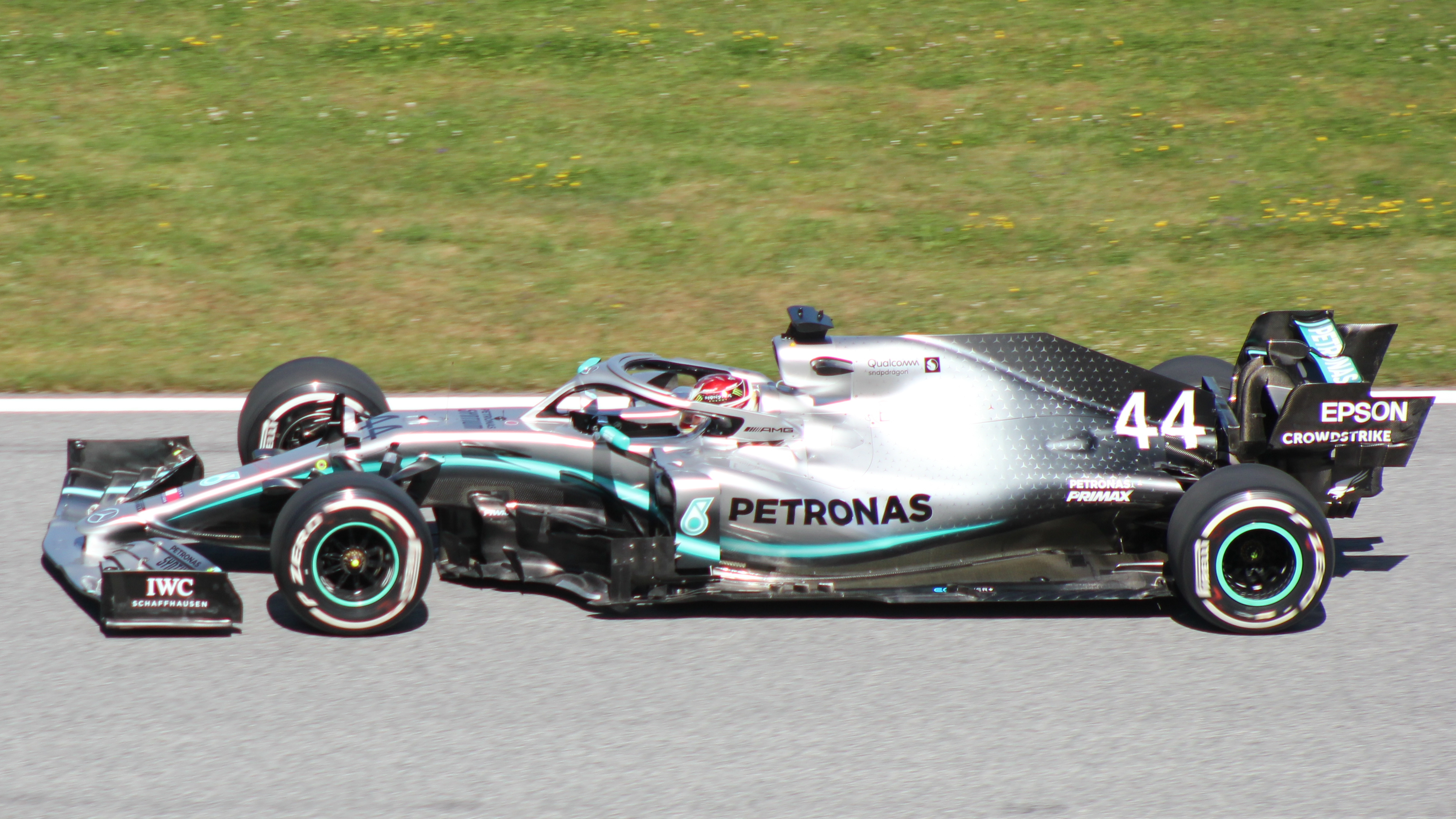
Lewis Hamilton driving the Mercedes AMG F1 W10 EQ Power+ at the 2019 Austrian Grand Prix.

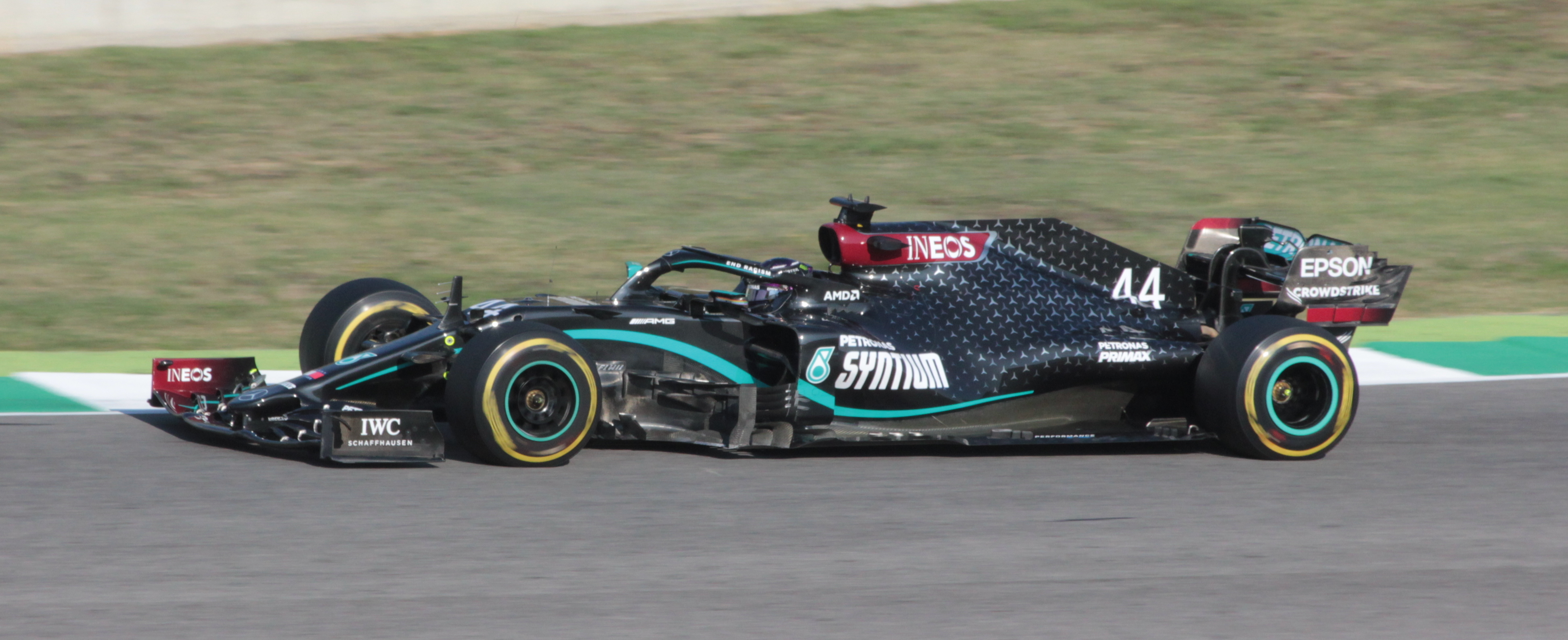
Lewis Hamilton driving the Mercedes-AMG F1 W11 EQ Performance at the 2020 Tuscan Grand Prix.

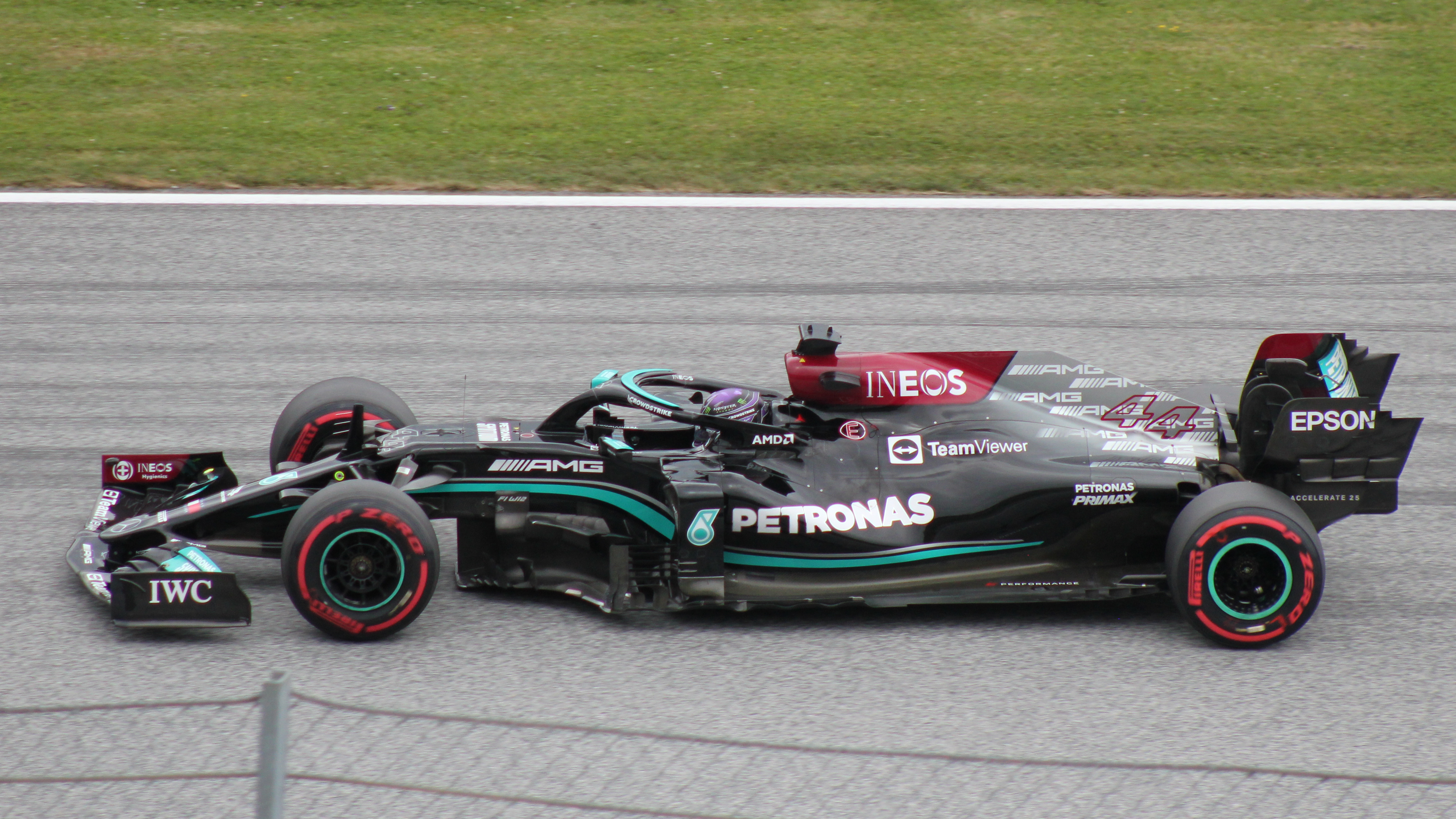
Lewis Hamilton driving the Mercedes-AMG F1 W12 E Performance at the 2021 Austrian Grand Prix.

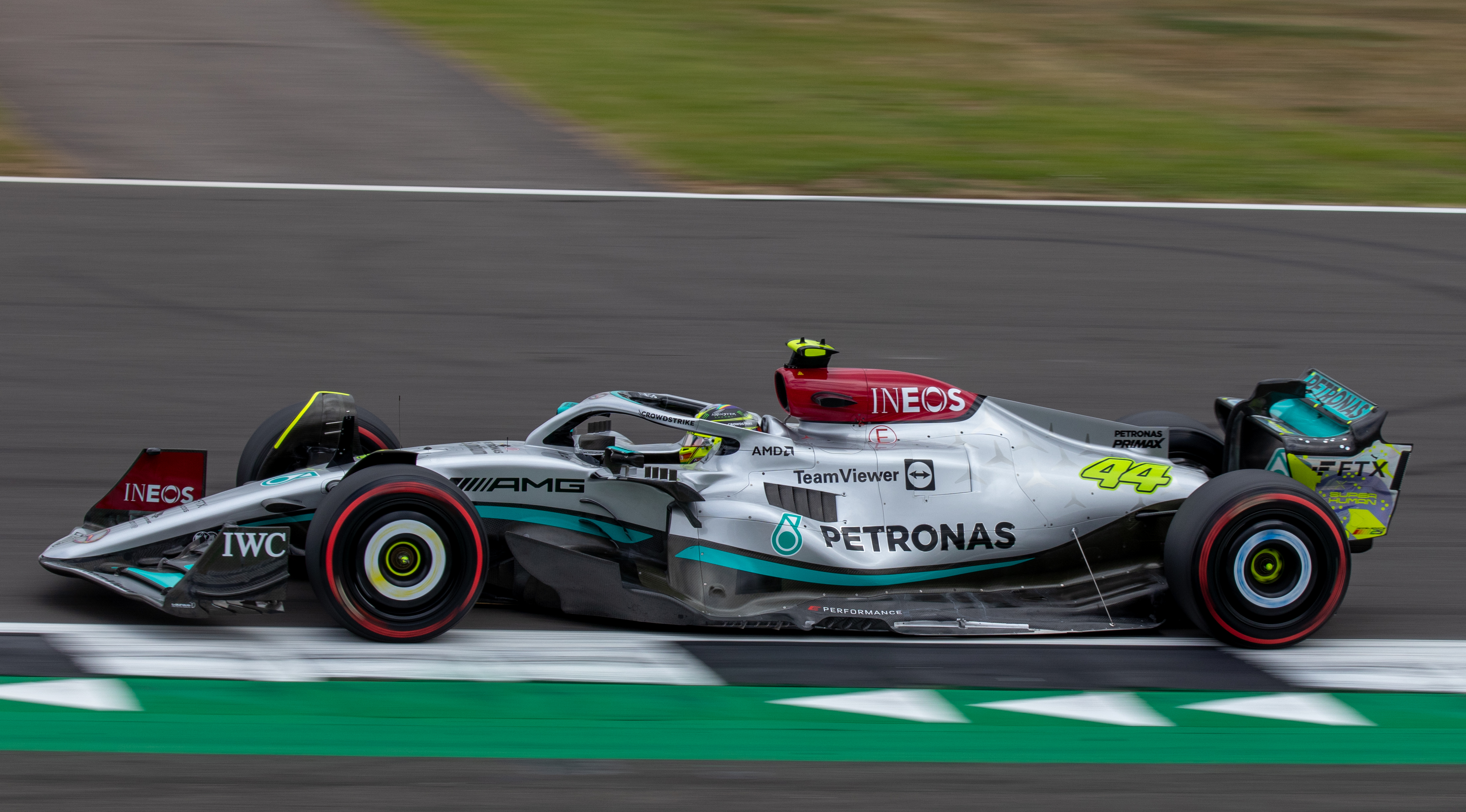
Lewis Hamilton driving the Mercedes-AMG F1 W13 E Performance at the 2022 British Grand Prix.

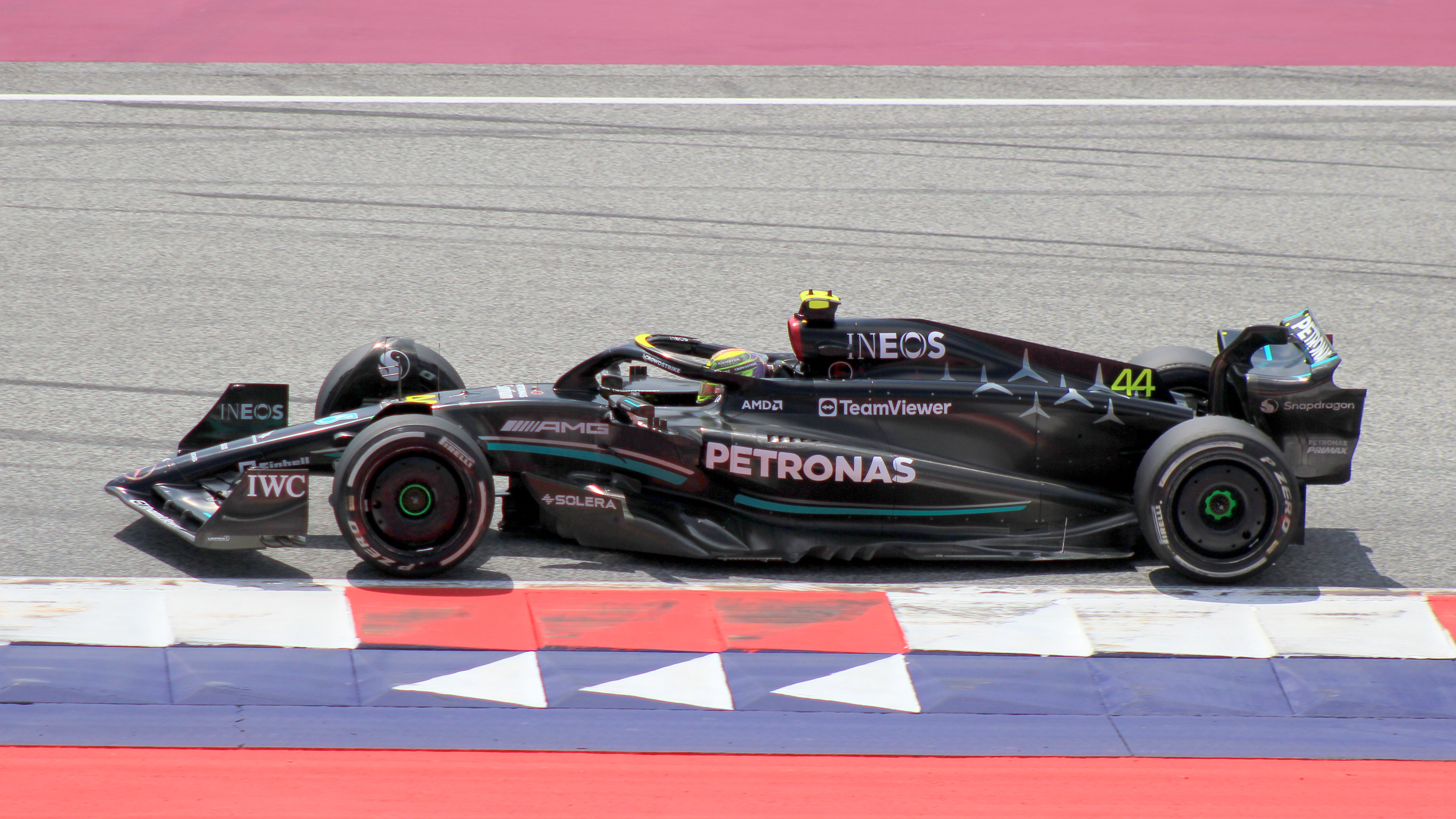
Lewis Hamilton driving the Mercedes-AMG F1 W14 E Performance at the 2023 Austrian Grand Prix.

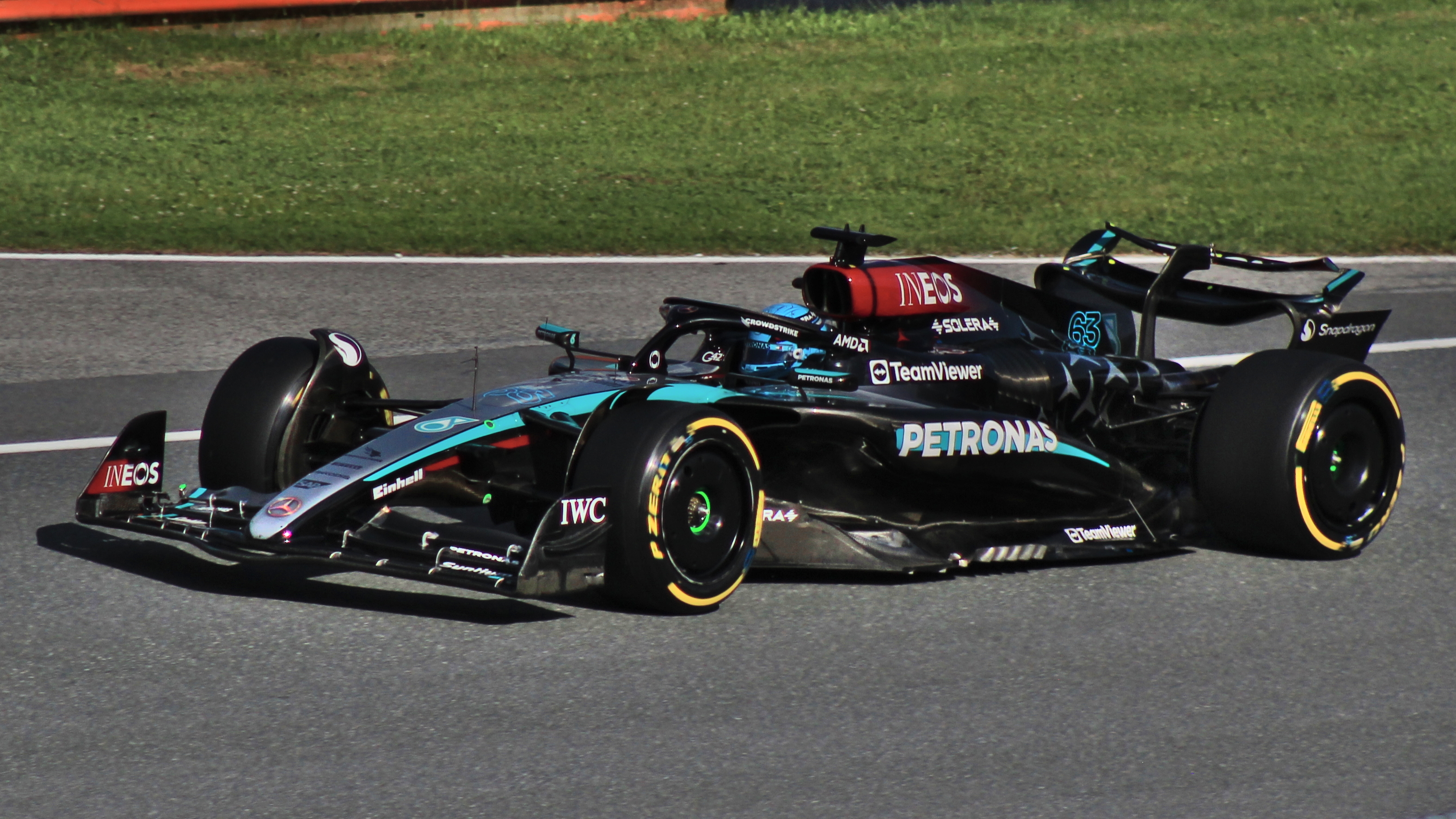
George Russell driving the Mercedes-AMG F1 W15 E Performance at the 2024 Austrian Grand Prix.

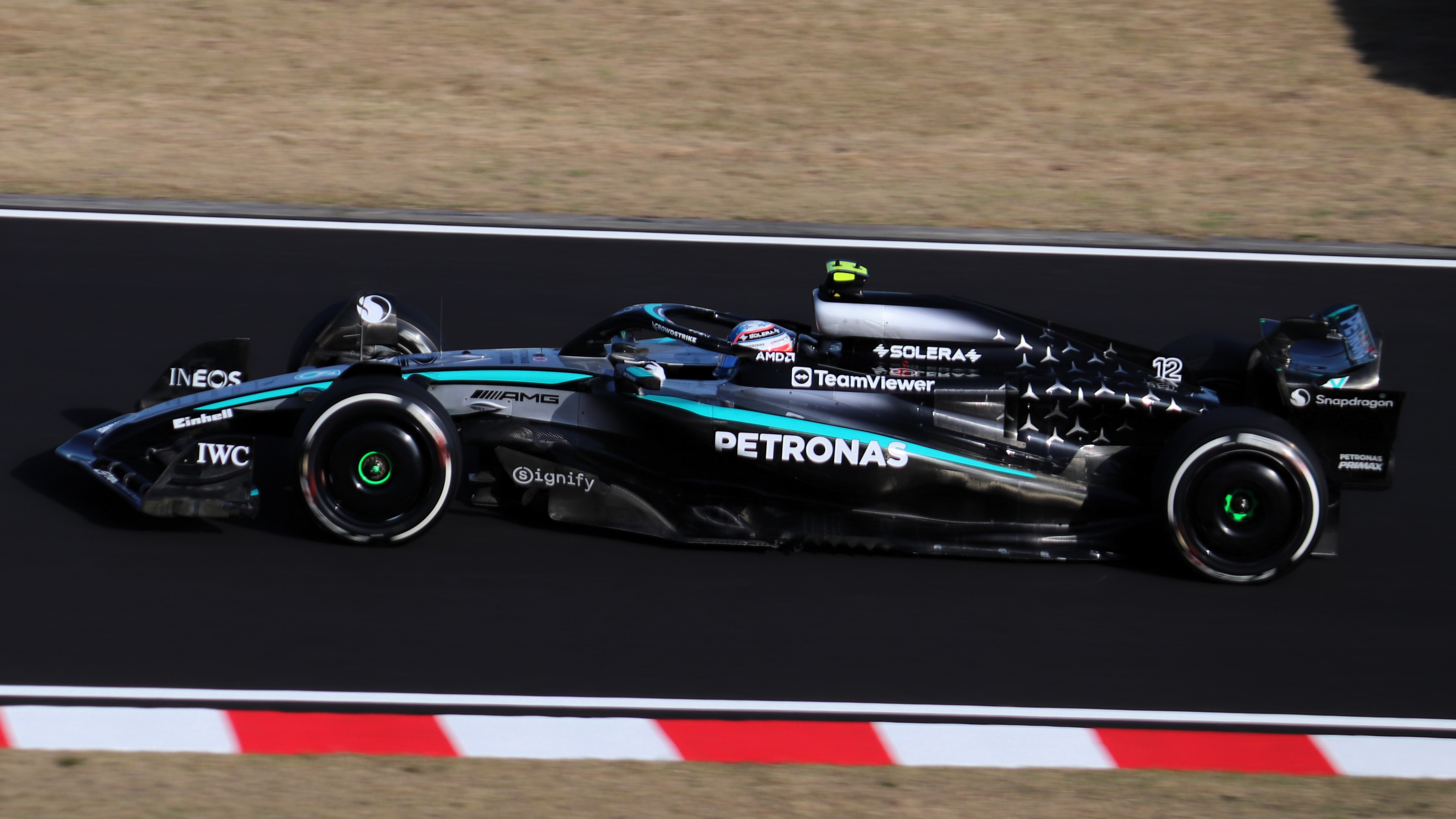
Andrea Kimi Antonelli driving the Mercedes-AMG F1 W16 E Performance at the 2025 Japanese Grand Prix.

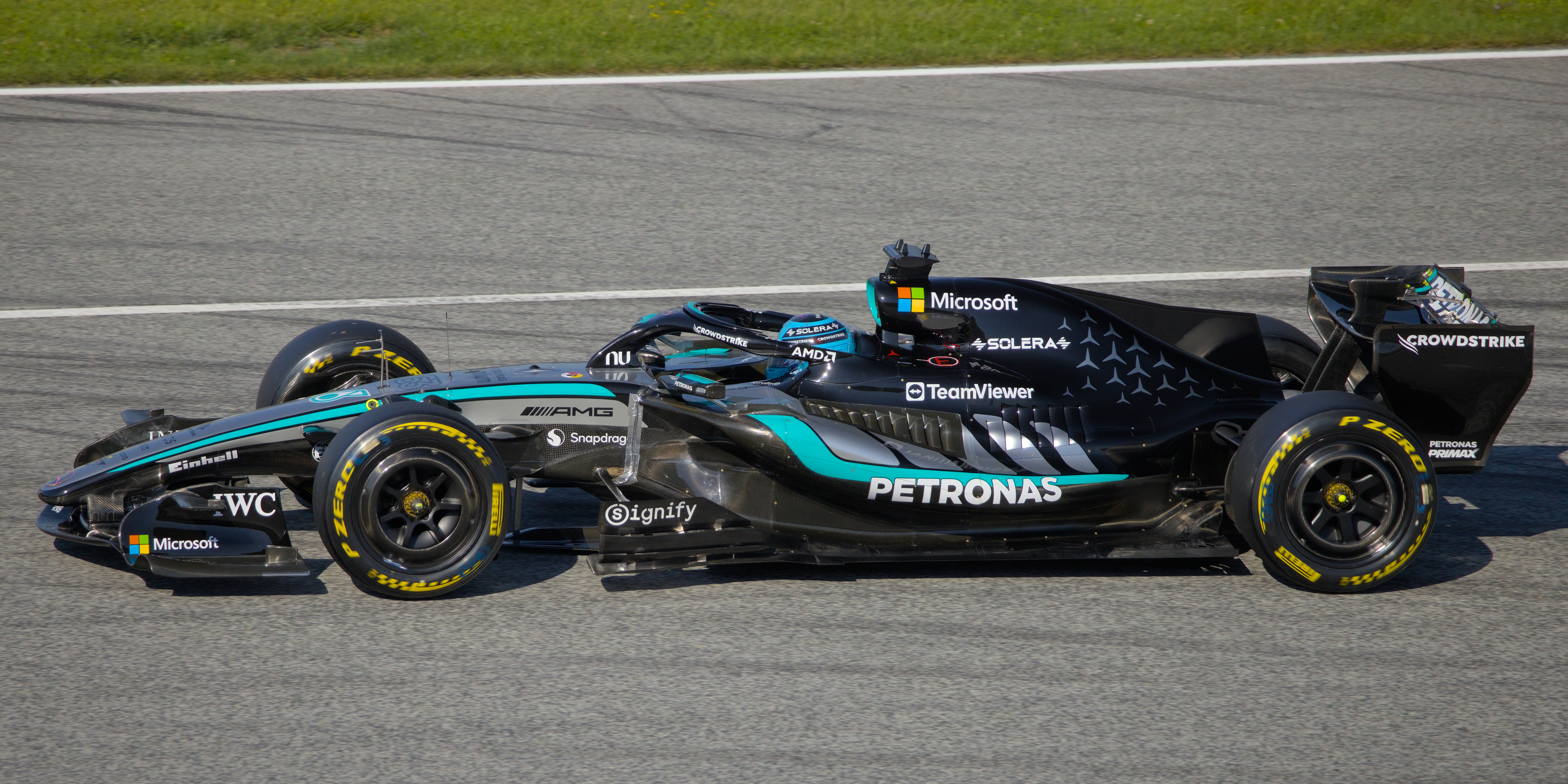
George Russell driving the Mercedes-AMG F1 W17 E Performance at the 2026 Austrian Grand Prix.

== Merzario ==
Year	Main colour(s)	Additional colour(s)	Main sponsor(s)	Additional major sponsor(s)
1977	Red			Fina, Goodyear
1978 (first version)	Red		Marlboro	Goodyear, Champion
1978 (second version)	Red	Black	Marlboro	Goodyear, Gulf, Champion
1978 (third version)	Black	Green	Marlboro, Florbath	Goodyear, Rodacciai, Champion
1979	Yellow	Black	Marlboro, Florbath	RETE, Rodacciai, Goodyear, Champion, Magneti Marelli, La Varesina Sofam Onoranze Funebri
1980	Yellow	Black	Marlboro, Florbath, Carta Blanca	RETE, Rodacciai, Goodyear, Champion, Magneti Marelli, La Varesina Sofam Onoranze Funebri, Agip, Würth

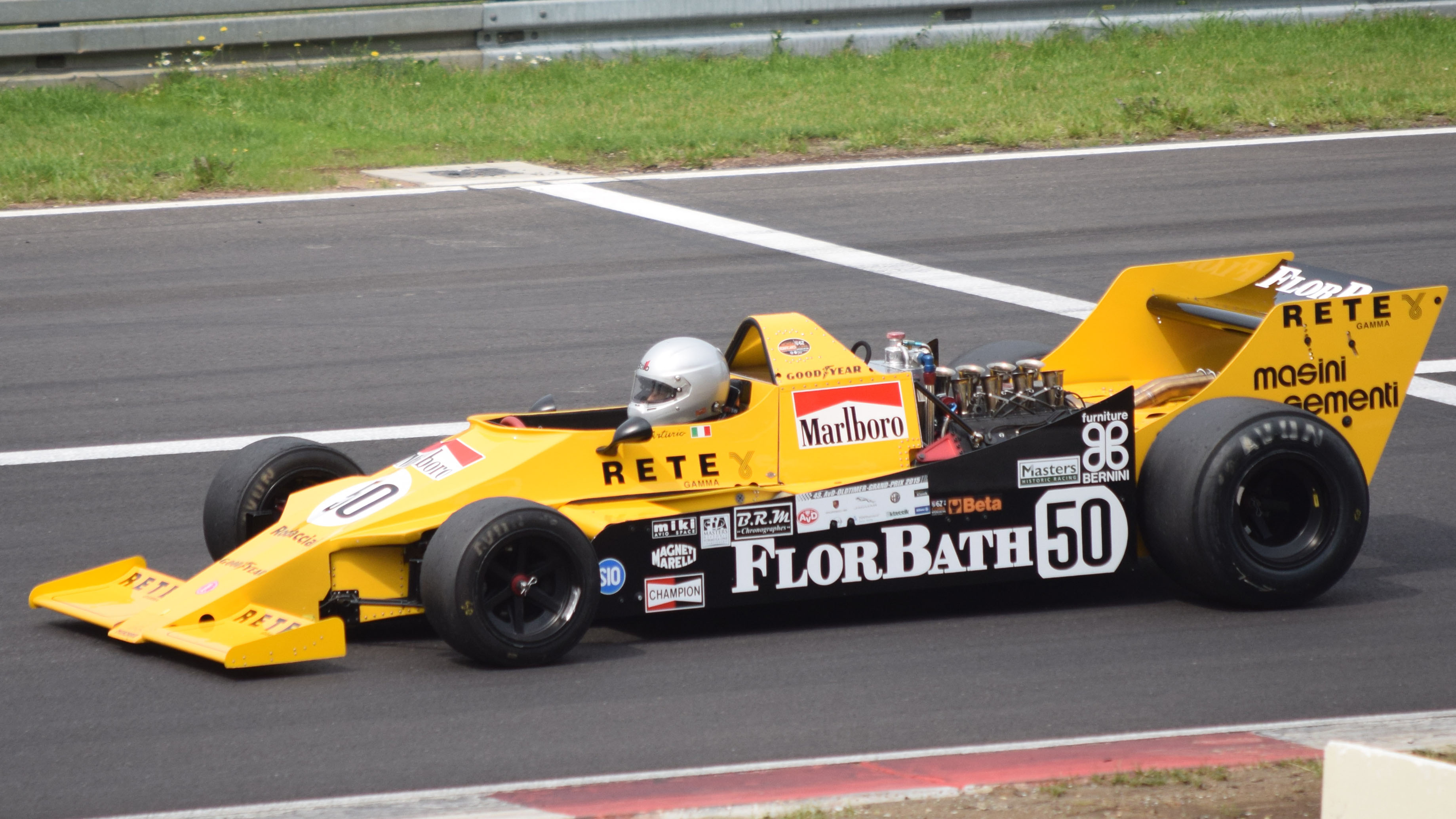
Merzario's final livery on the Merzario A2.

== Midland ==
Midland F1 competed for only one year, 2006. They took over Jordan in 2005, but Midland sold it in late 2006 to Spyker. They were the first F1 team to compete with a Russian license. (After Spyker's takeover in mid-2006, the team changed its livery to orange and name to Spyker MF1 Racing. In 2007, the team competed as Spyker F1.)

Year	Main colour(s)	Additional colour(s)	Livery sponsor(s)	Additional major sponsor(s)
2006	Grey	White, Red	Midland	Rhino's, Mingya, JVC, Zim, TrekStor, Weigl, MAN, Euro Poker.com, Superfund, Toyota
2006 (after Spyker takeover)	Orange	Silver	Spyker, Rhino's	Mingya, Euro Poker.com, Zim, TrekStor, Weigl, MAN, JVC, Superfund, Toyota

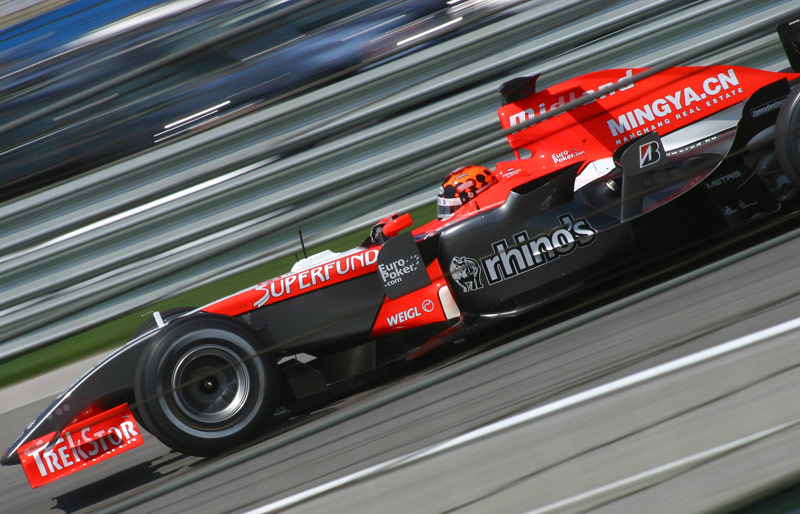
Christijan Albers in the 2006 United States Grand Prix.

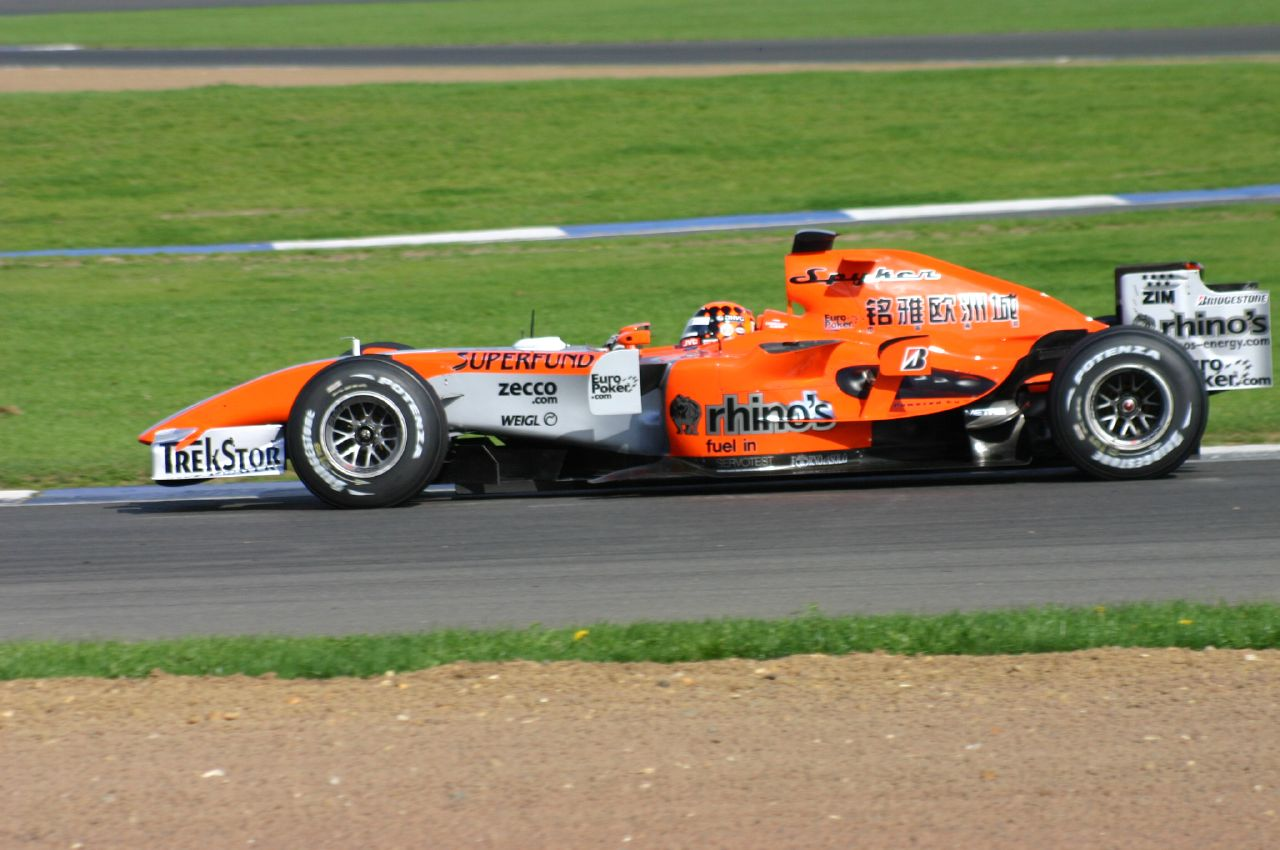
Christijan Albers driving a 2006 M16 in the late season Spyker livery.

== Minardi ==
During its 21 seasons in Formula One, Minardi became known as one of the sport's longest-running lower-ranked teams. Despite using a wide range of sponsors over the years, the team's cars were most commonly painted in predominantly black liveries.

Year	Main colour(s)	Additional colour(s)	Main sponsor(s)	Additional major sponsor(s)	Non-tobacco/alcohol livery changes
1985	Black	Yellow	Simod Sportshoes, Gilmar	Resta, Pirelli, Brembo, Koni	
1986	Black	Yellow	Simod Sportshoes, Gilmar	Resta, Agip, Pirelli, Magneti Marelli	
1987	Black	Yellow	Simod Sportshoes, Minardi	Reporter, Intercosmo, Lois Jeans, Resta	
1988	Black, Yellow	White	Cimaron, Lois Jeans	Gilmar, Resta, Simair, Goodyear, Koni, Atlantic, Sanyo, Camel	
1989	Black	Yellow	Simod Sportshoes, Campogalliano Ceramiche	Mokador, Cavallo, Atlantic, Pirelli, Marri, Resta, IBF Formularios	
1990	White, Yellow	Black	Scm Group, Sime, Lois Jeans	Mokador, Malizia, Agip, Pirelli, Resta, Roltra	
1991–1992	Black, Yellow	White	minardi, Campogalliano Ceramiche	Mercatone Uno, Scm Group, Lamborghini, Chrysler, Agip, Sasiem, Resta, IBF Formularios	
1993	White, Black	Yellow	Beta, minardi, Valleverde	Mercatone Uno, COCIF, Agip, Roerig, Magneti Marelli, Goodyear, Malaguti	
1994	Sky Blue, White, Blue	Orange, Black, Yellow	Lucchini, Beta, Fondmetal, Valleverde, Ford, Service Grandiola, Omersub, Central Park	Agip, COCIF, RBM, Magneti Marelli, Resta, Bee, Malaguti, Mercatone Uno	
1995–1996	Dark Blue, Fluorescent Green	White	Doimo, Valleverde, BRUMS, Catamaran Watches, Ford, Clearly Canadian, Marlboro (1995)	Bossini, Beta, Goodyear, RBM, Fondmetal, Império Bonança, Galletti-Boston, Magneti Marelli, Mercatone Uno, RBM, Kamikawa Clinic, Lusfina	At the 1995 Australian Grand Prix, "Grazie Adelaide" ("Goodbye Adelaide") was placed on the engine cover. Marlboro changed to bar code (1995)
1997	Black, Blue	White, Yellow	Mild Seven, Roces	Doimo, Fondmetal, Magneti Marelli, COCIF, Beta, Valleverde	Mild Seven changed to Mild Seven logo
1998	Blue	White	Fondmetal, Roces, Avex Group	Doimo, Ventura, Telecom, Bossini, Visa, Beta Tools, Cimatron	
1999	Silver, Blue	None	Fondmetal, Telefónica	Ford, Roces, Quilmes, Magneti Marelli, SAICO, Cimatron, Beta Tools, Sorbini, Doimo, PDP, Molveno Oem	
2000	Yellow	Blue	Fondmetal, Telefónica	PSN, Doimo, COCIF, PDP, Musashi, Cimatron, Brembo, Beta Tools, Sorbini, Frezia, I.A.N., Bridgestone, Magneti Marelli, Allegrini	
2001	Black	White	European Aviation	Magnum, LeasePlan, COCIF, Gericom, PDP, LG, Allegrini, Bossini, Ciet, Sorbini, Cimatron, Beta Tools, Michelin, Fabia, CorpoNove, Sebring, BioFox, Diemme, Magneti Marelli, C2C, Rolling Center	
2002	Black	Red, White	Go KL (Kuala Lumpur), European Aviation, Magnum	Asiatech, Magneti Marelli, Quadriga, Gazprom, Beta Tools, Michelin, Cimatron, CPP, Brevi, Healthy, Admiral, Allegrini, PC Suria, 3D Systems	
2003	Black	White, Red	Trust, Wilux, Muermans Groep, European Aviation	Gazprom, Superfund, Cimatron, Beta Tools, Magneti Marelli, JSP, Palmer Sport, Allegrini, Brevi, Halfords, SBS, SWS, LeasePlan, Stayer	
2004	Black, Green	White, Red	Trust, Wilux, Muermans Groep, Superfund	OzJet, UNIQA, Magneti Marelli, ER9S, CIB Lizing, Brevi, Allegrini, Fondmetal, COCIF, Feedback, CONNECT, Cimatron, Beta Tools, Santogal Grupo, Auto Glym, 3D Systems, LeasePlan, Bridgestone	During the 2004 United States Grand Prix, Minardi's livery featured logos of Mandemakers Keukens and Goldenpalace.com. The team also ran without sponsorship on race day at the 2004 British Grand Prix due to the death of Sporting Director, John Walton.
2005	Black	White	OzJet	co2neutraal.tv, Lost Boys, MAN, JVC, Muermans Group, SMP Bank, Upex, Kärnten, LB Icon, Beta Tools, Midac, Magneti Marelli, LeasePlan, Bridgestone	

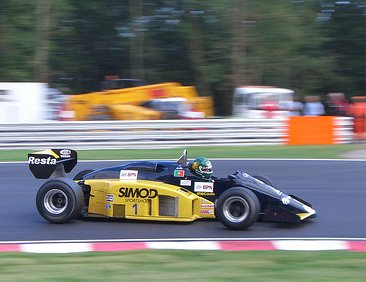
Minardi raced variations on this original black-and-gold livery in the period 1985–1992. This is a Minardi M185 being raced at Brands Hatch in 2005.

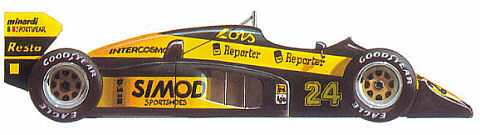
A Minardi M187 from 1987

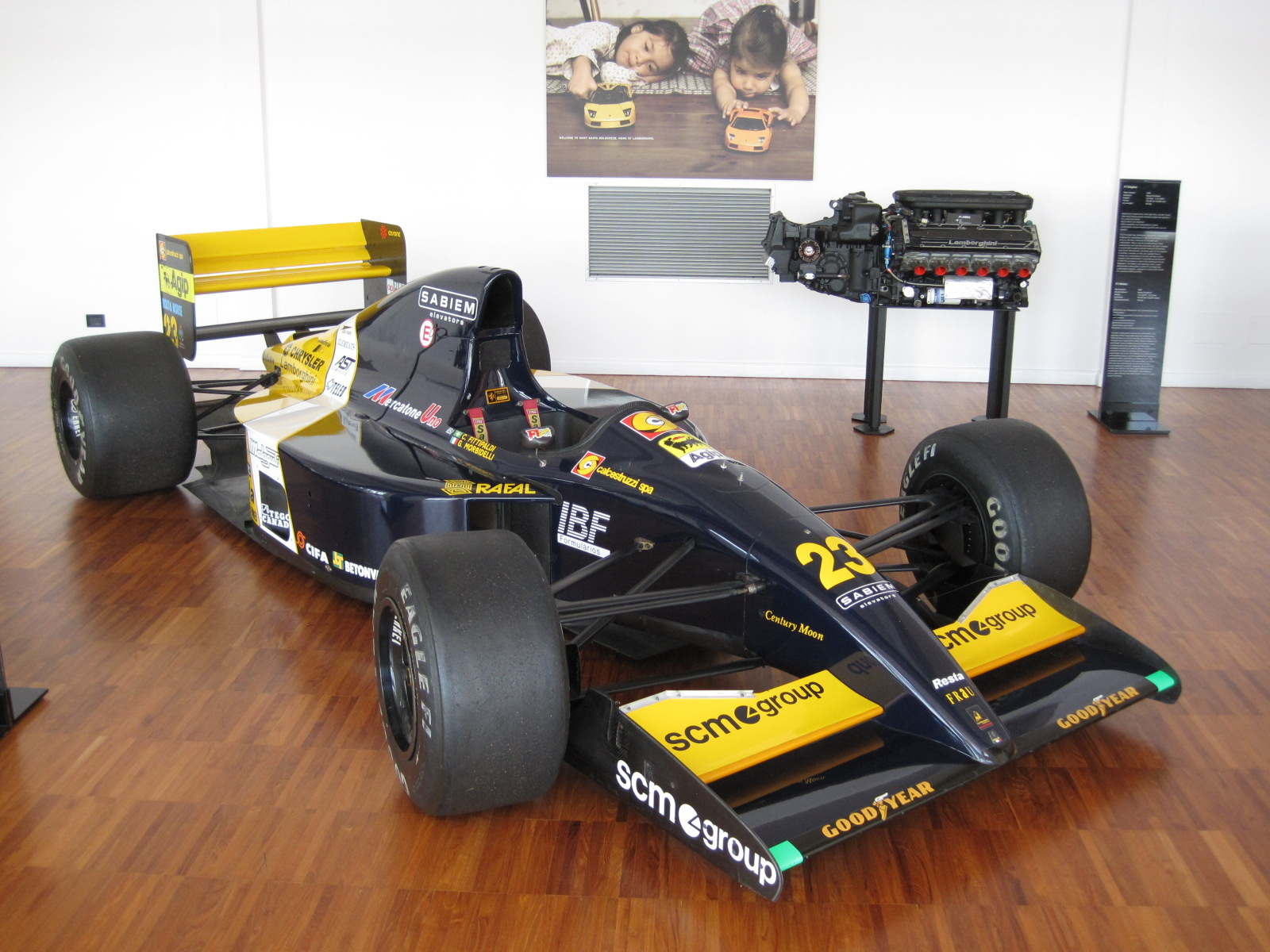
A Minardi M191 at the Lamborghini Museum.

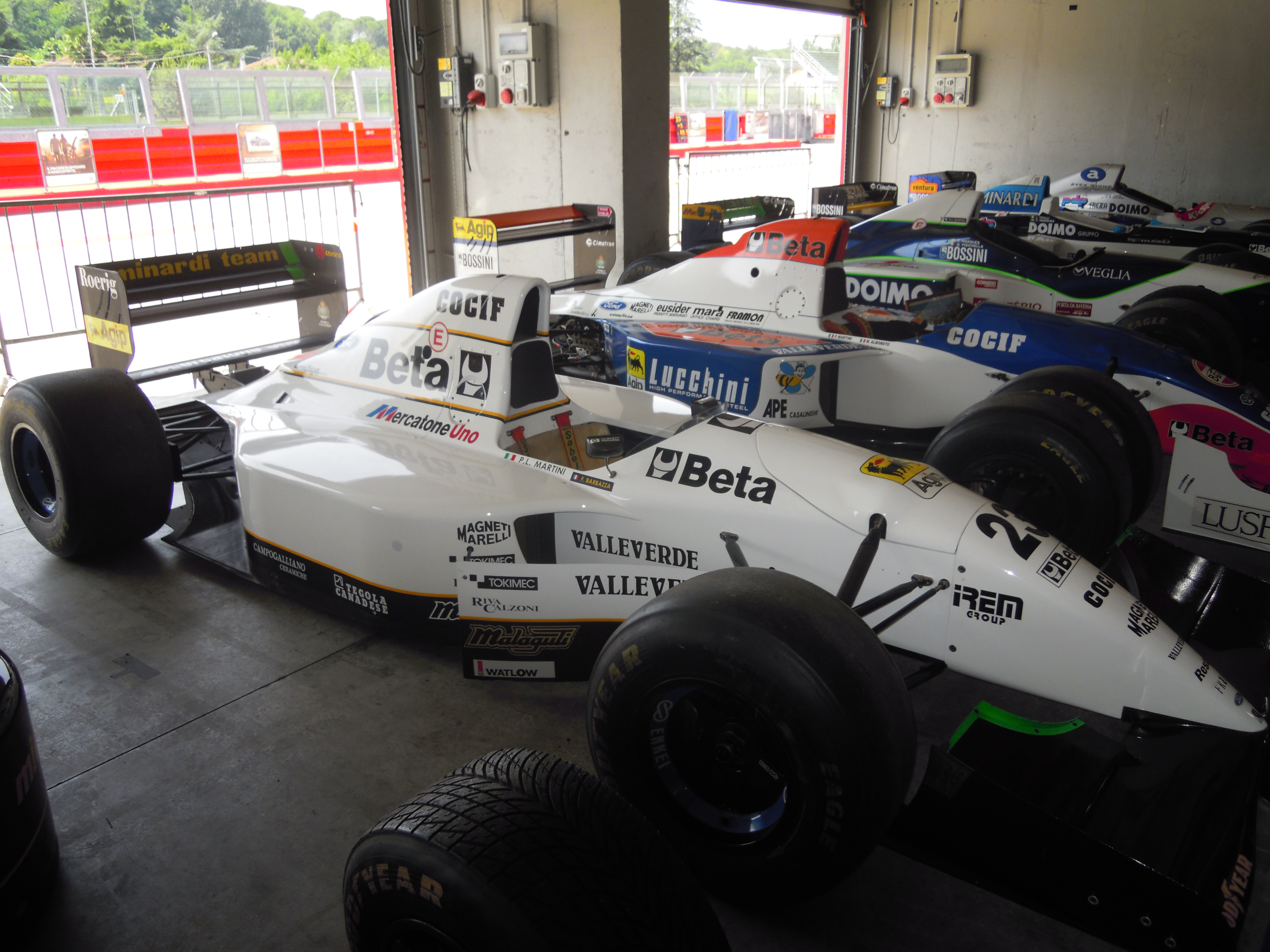
A Minardi M193 in display at the Autodromo Enzo e Dino Ferrari.

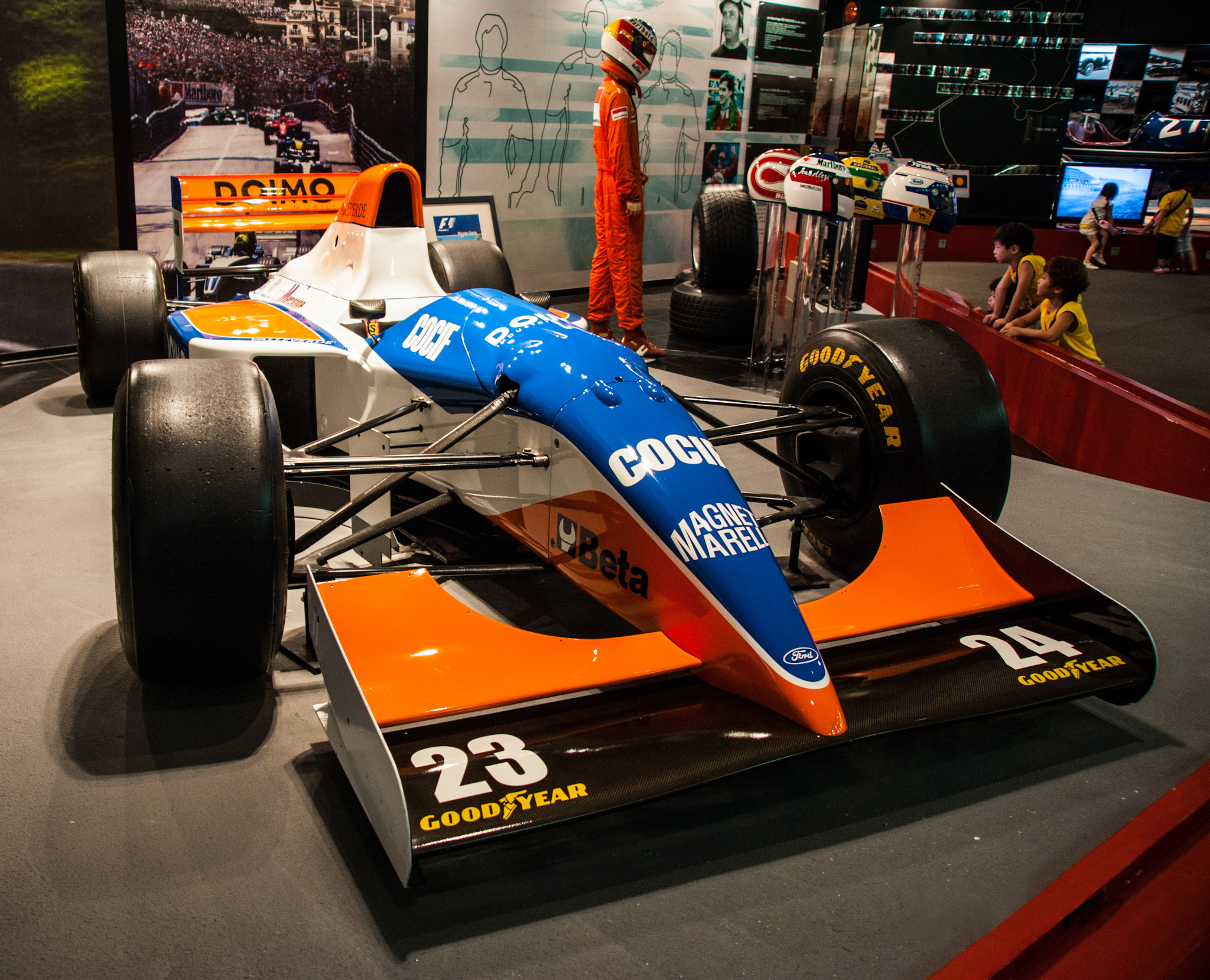
A Minardi M193B with the 1994 Livery in exposition in South Korea.

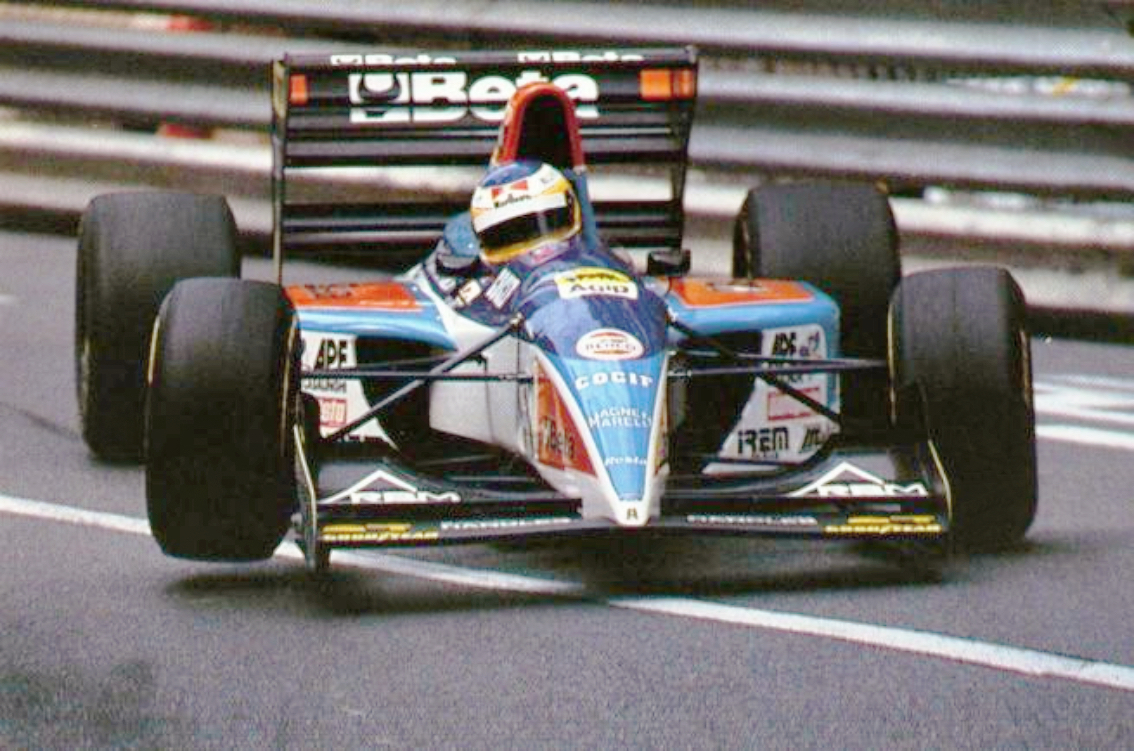
Michele Alboreto driving at the 1994 Monaco Grand Prix.

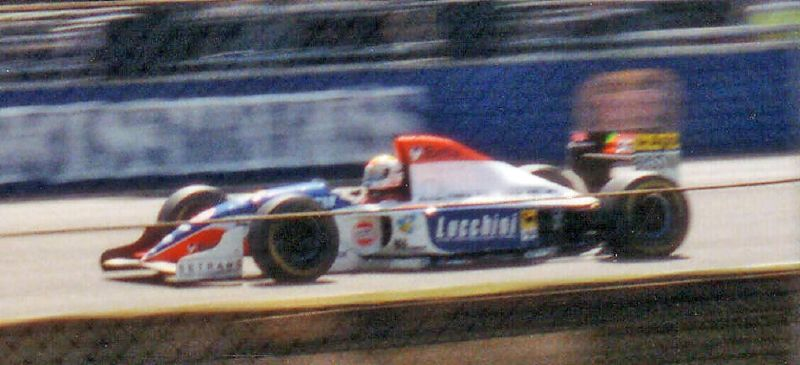
The absorption of the BMS Scuderia Italia team into Minardi for 1994 resulted in sponsorship from many Italian companies. This is Pierluigi Martini driving the Minardi M194 at the 1994 British Grand Prix.

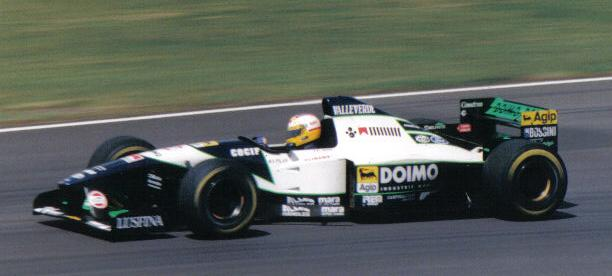
Luca Badoer at the 1995 British Grand Prix

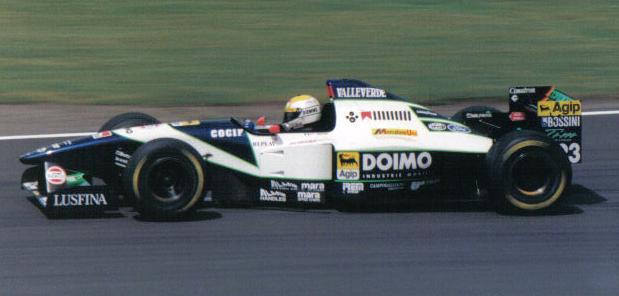
Pierluigi Martini at the 1995 British Grand Prix

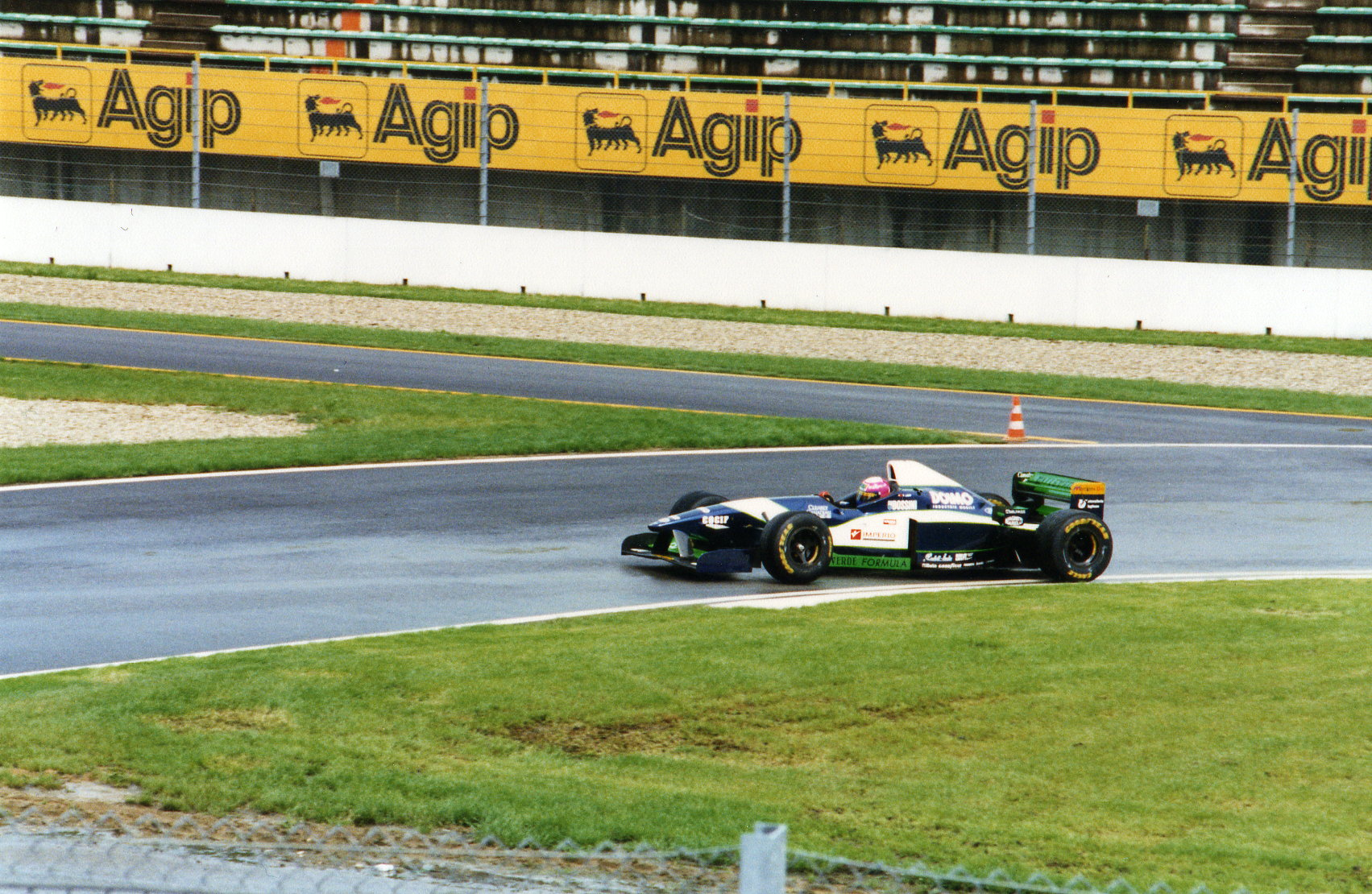
Pedro Lamy at the 1996 San Marino Grand Prix.

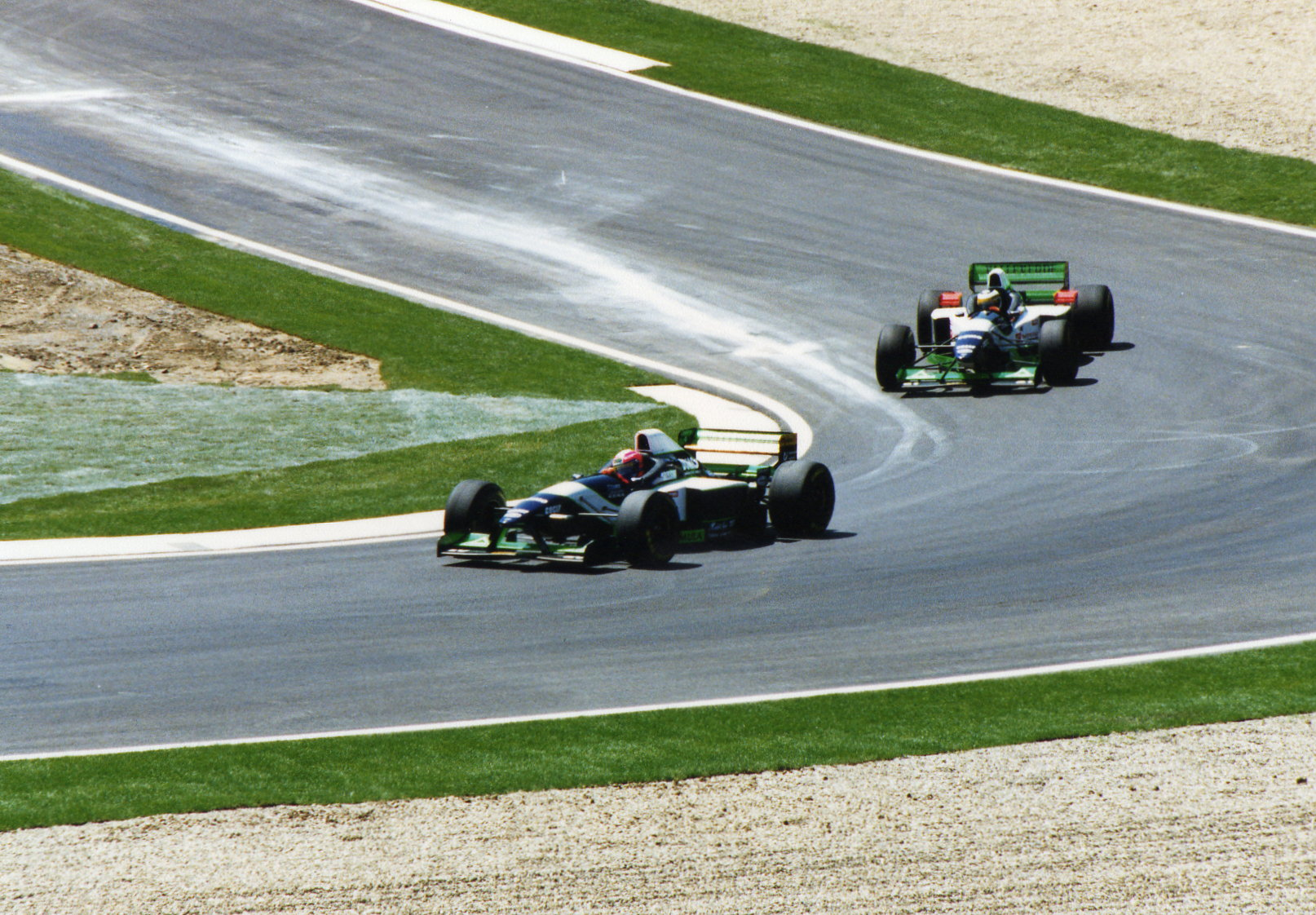
Pedro Lamy and Giancarlo Fisichella racing for Minardi in 1996

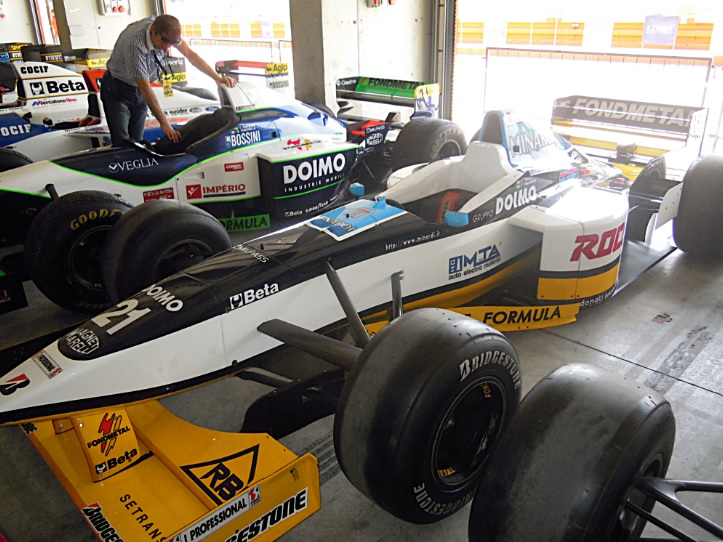
A Minardi M197 in display.

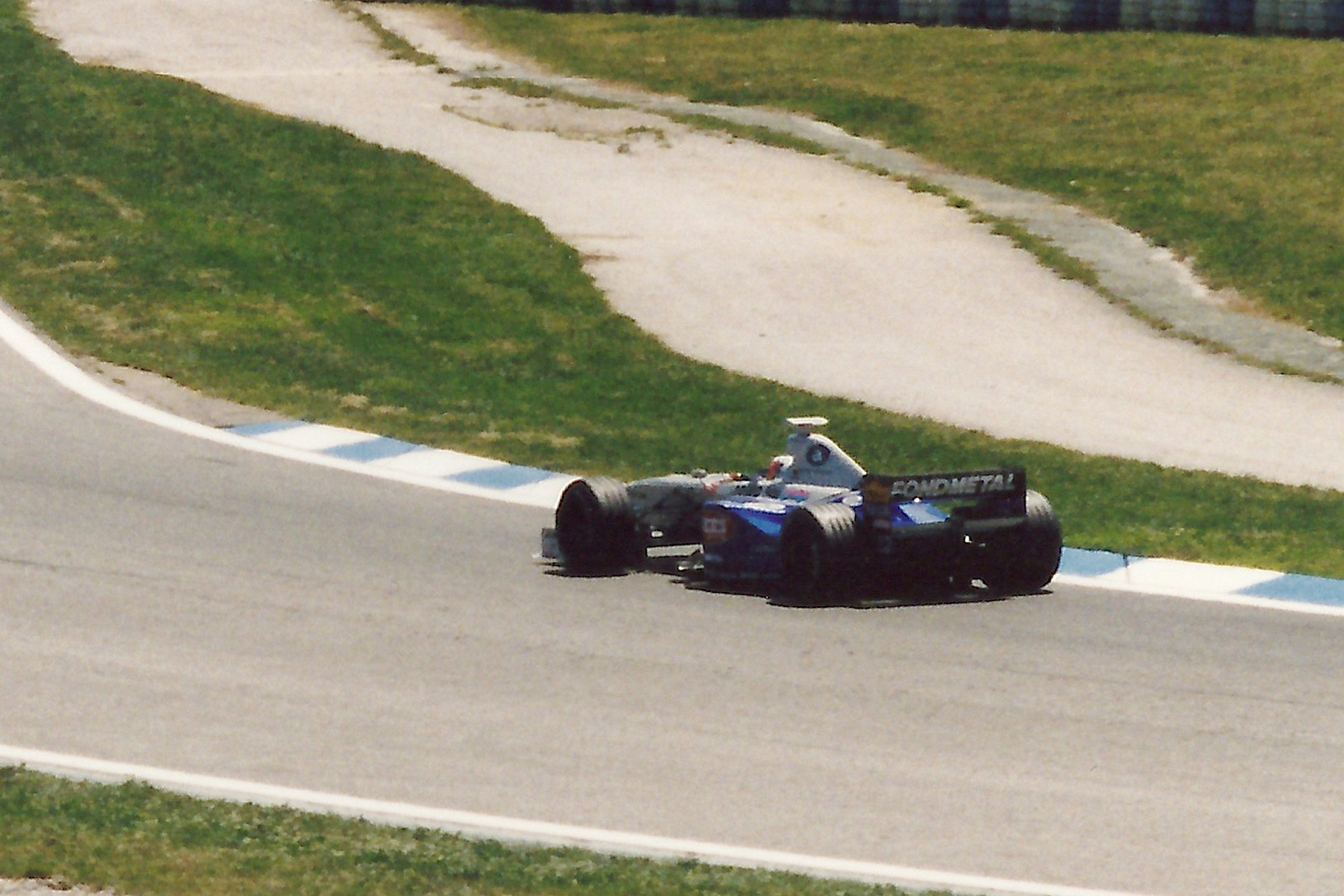
Shinji Nakano racing at the 1998 Spanish Grand Prix

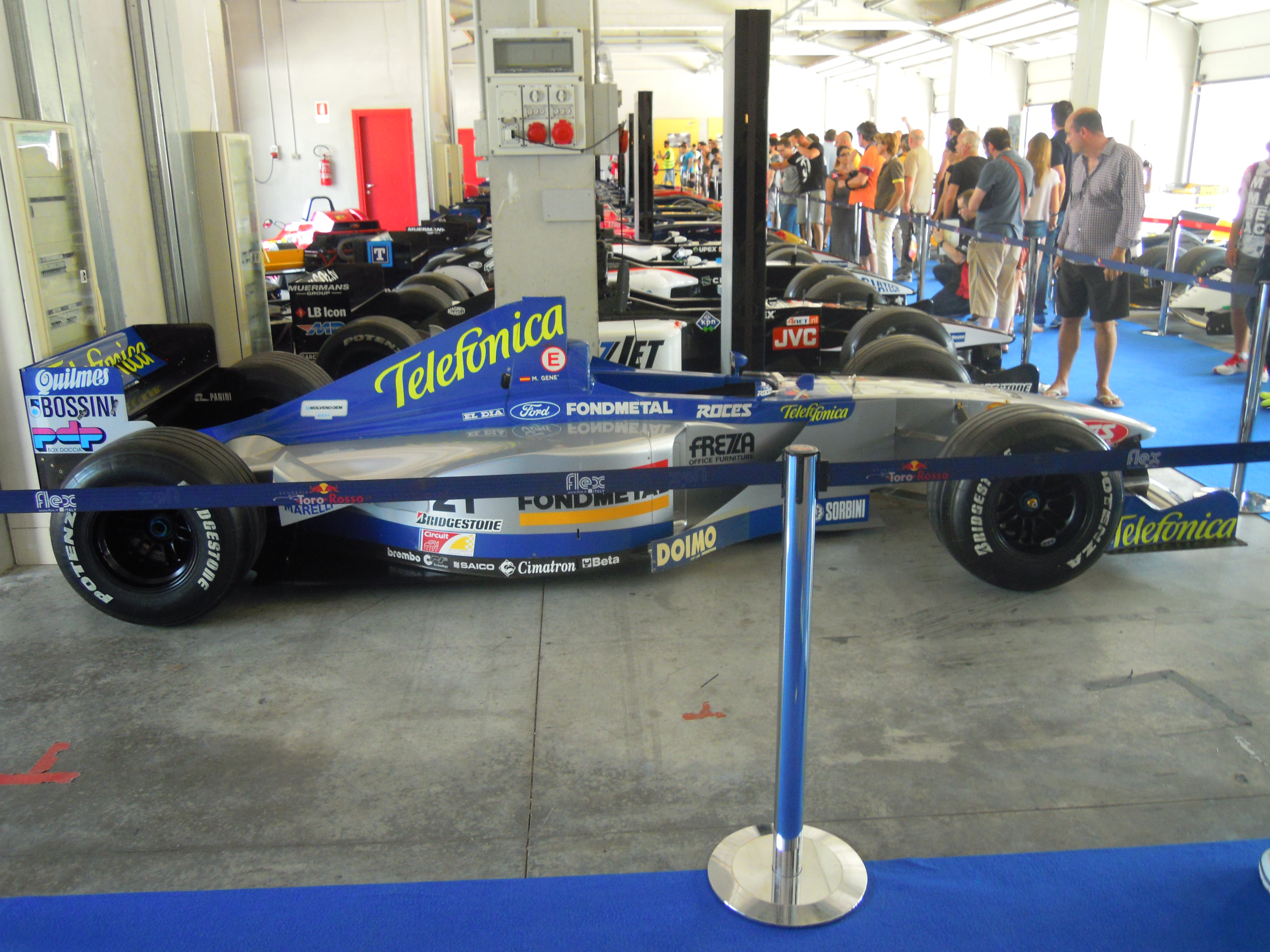
A Minardi M01 in display.

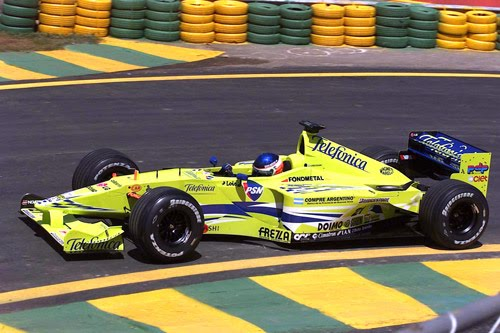
Gastón Mazzacane racing for Minardi at the 2000 season.

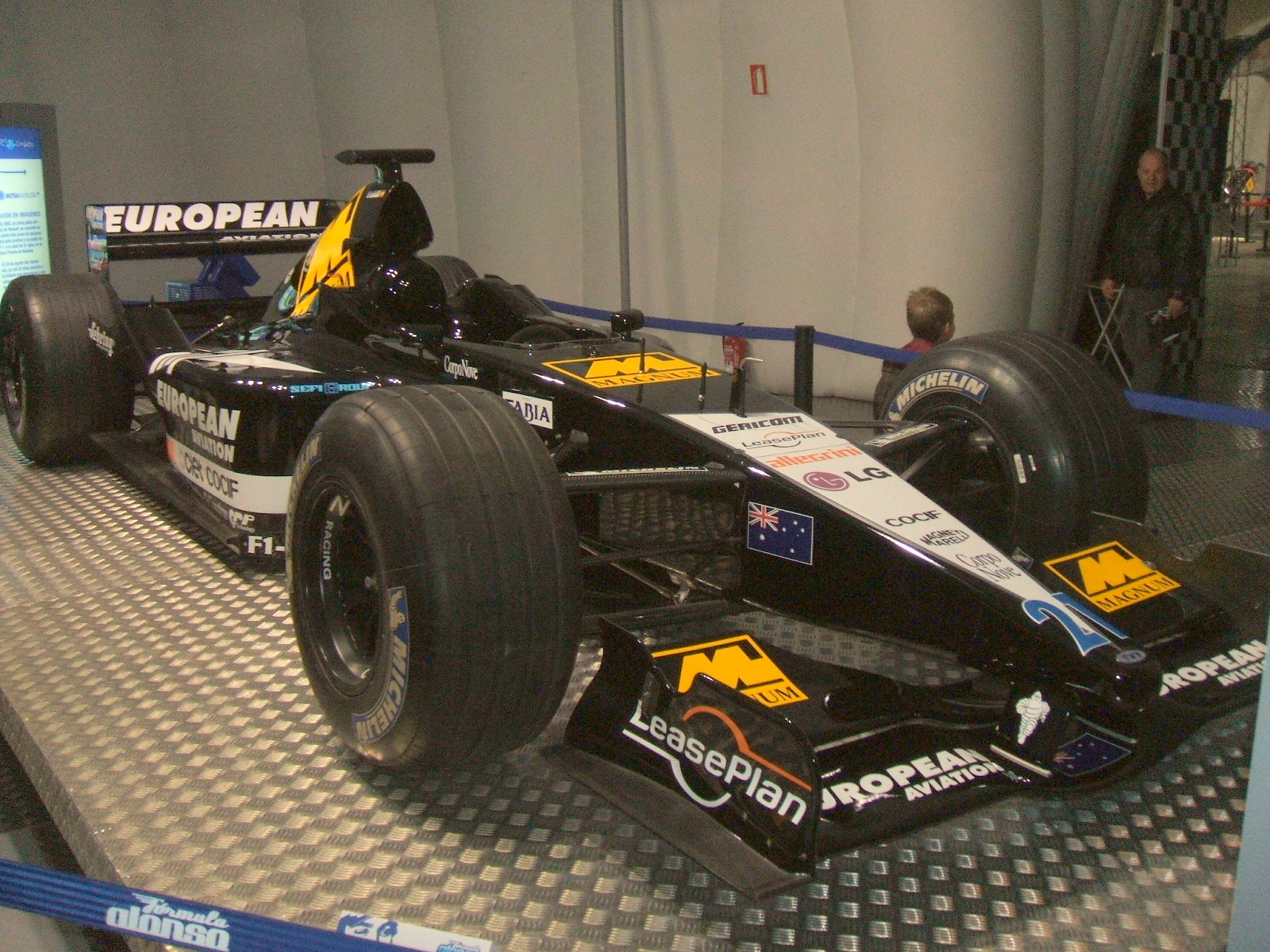
The Minardi PS01 driven by Fernando Alonso in display

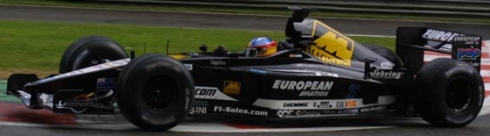
Fernando Alonso driving for Minardi at the 2001 Season.

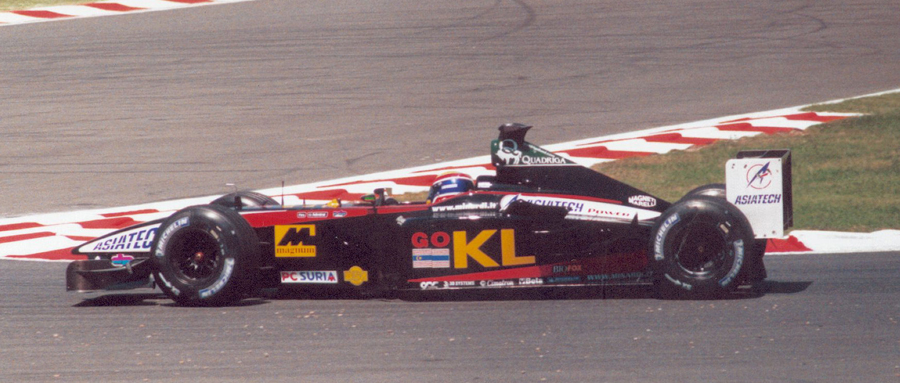
Mark Webber's Minardi PS02 features "Go KL" branding at the 2002 French Grand Prix due to the identity of his Malaysian teammate, Alex Yoong.

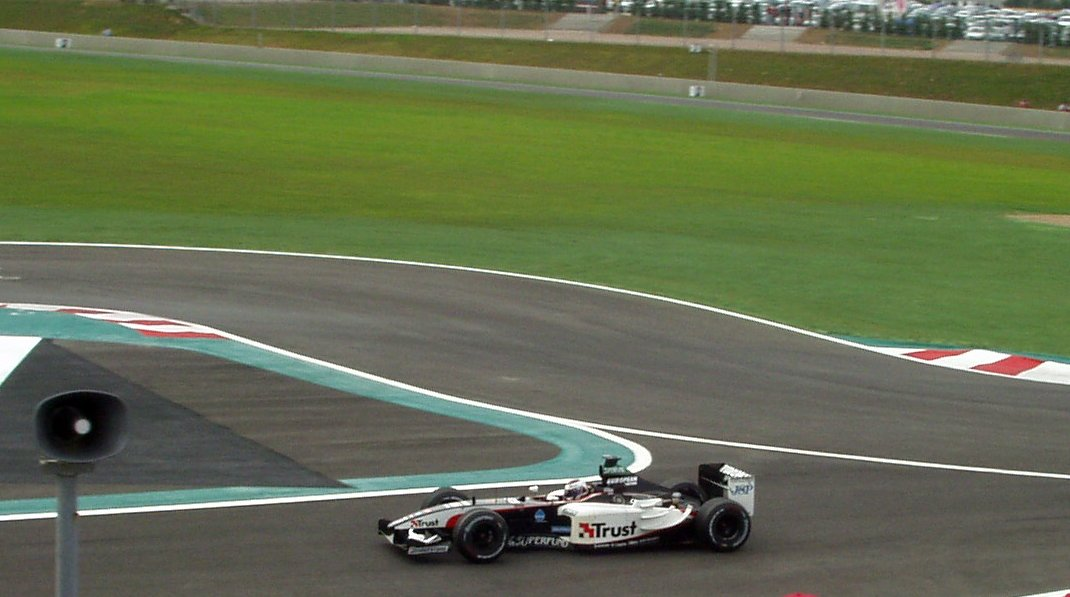
Jos Verstappen at the 2003 French Grand Prix

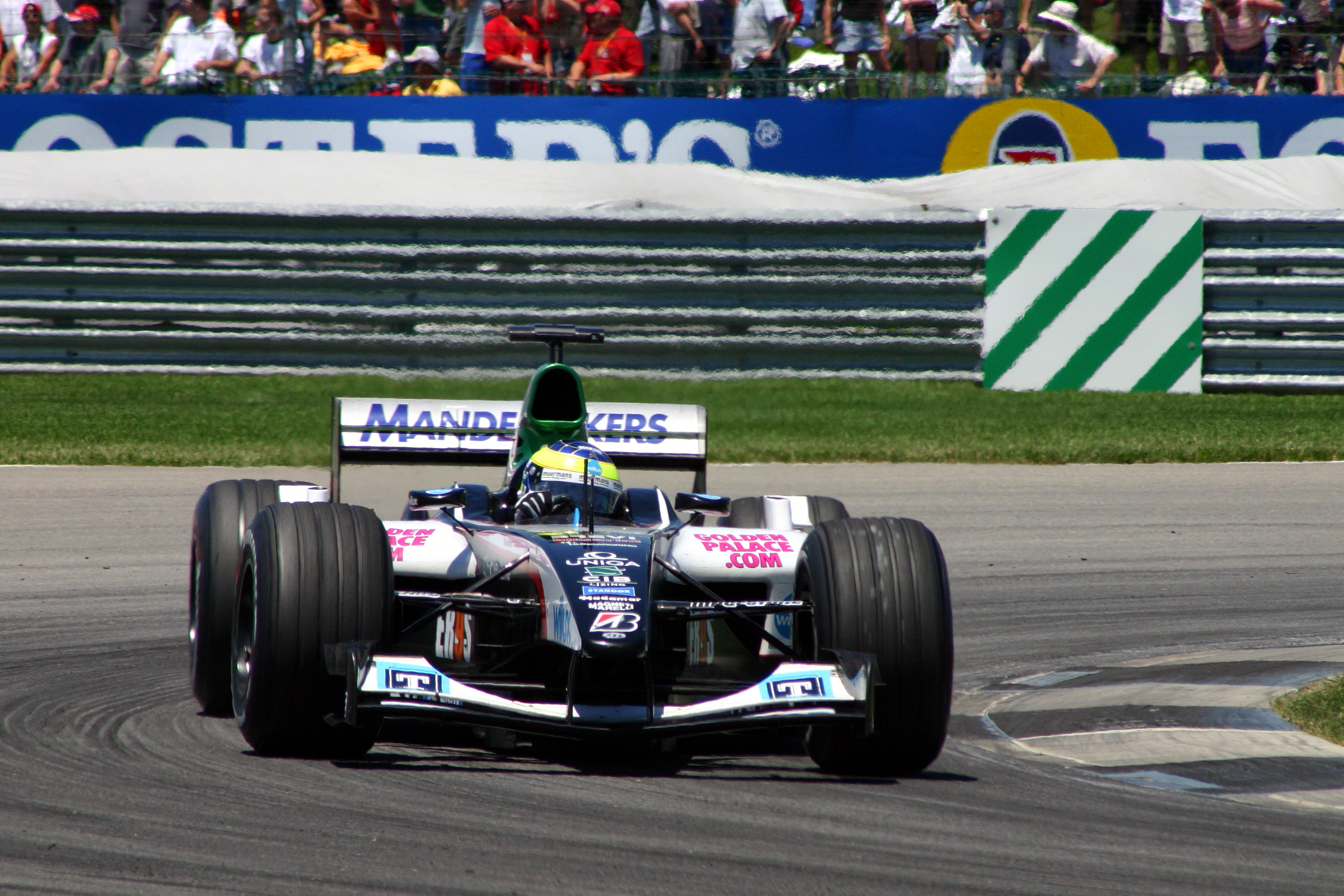
Zsolt Baumgartner in Indianapolis 2004 racing with his Minardi PS04

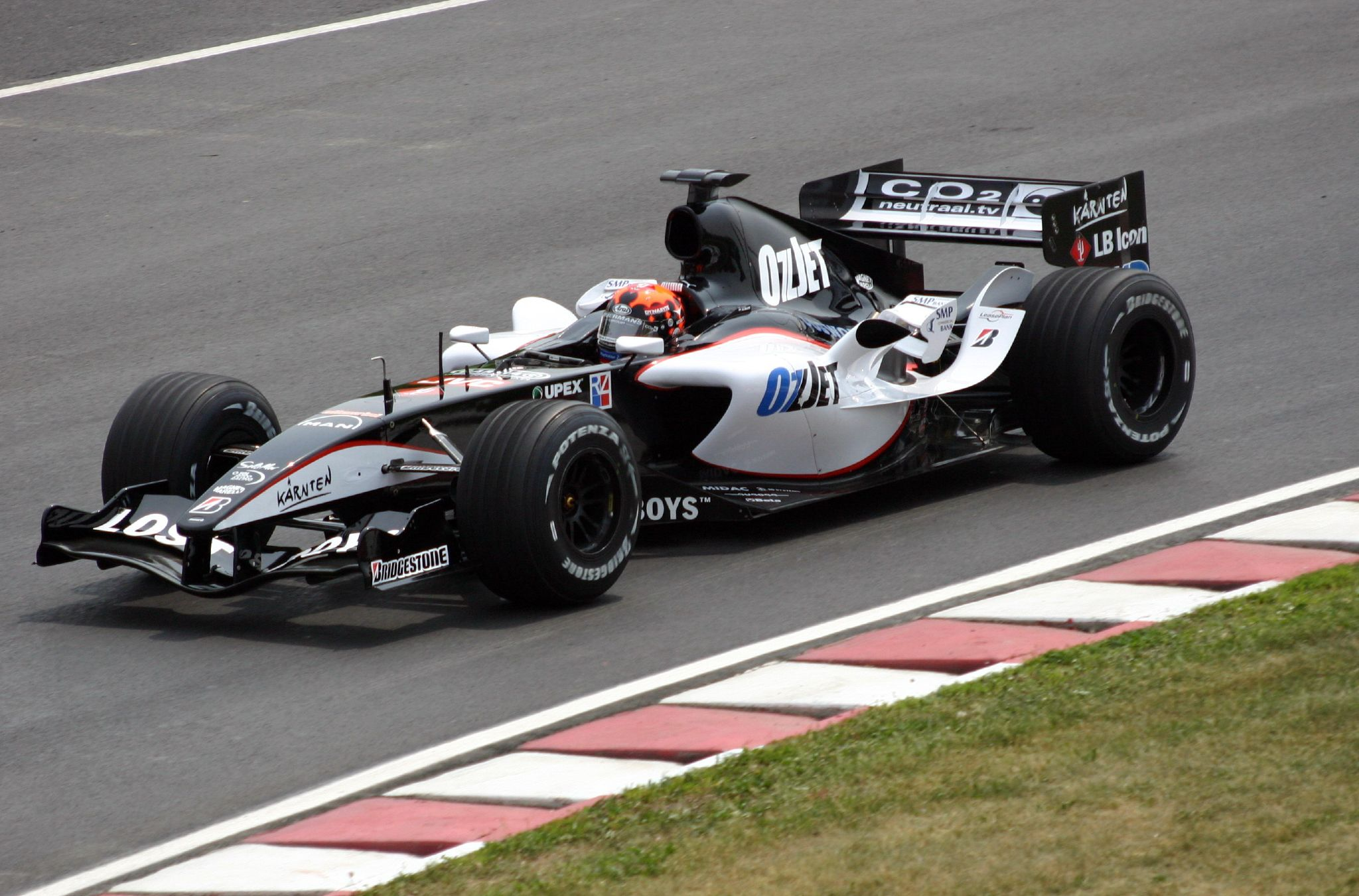
Christijan Albers driving the Minardi PS05 at the 2005 Canadian Grand Prix. OzJet is an aviation company owned by the CEO of Minardi from 2001 to 2005, Paul Stoddart.

== Modena ==
Year	Main colour(s)	Additional colour(s)	Main sponsor(s)	Additional major sponsor(s)
1991	Blue	Black	Victors, Grana Padano, LeasePlan, Central Park Hotel	Agip, Goodyear, Radar, Lamborghini, Nolan

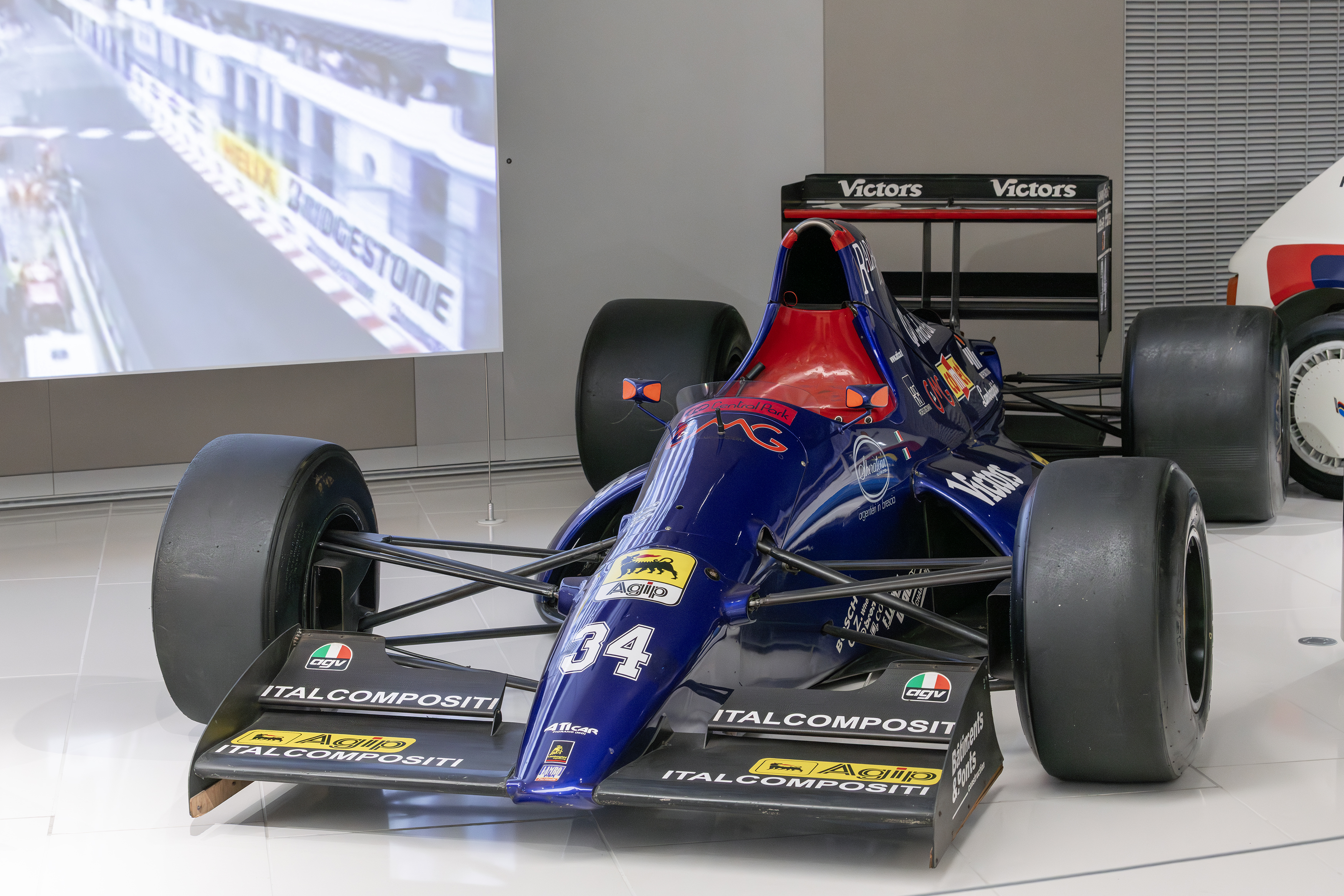
Modena's Lambo 291, used during their only season in Formula One.

== Onyx ==
Year	Main colour(s)	Additional colour(s)	Main sponsor(s)	Additional major sponsor(s)	Non-tobacco/alcohol livery changes(s)
1989	Blue	White, Pink	Moneytron	Marlboro, P'tit Lou, Autokrant, CAPA, Goodyear, Nokia Data, Neste Oil	"Marlboro" was replaced with barcode, the Chevron logo is retained
1990	Blue	White, Green/Pink	Monteverdi Automuseum	Marlboro, Goodyear	"Marlboro" was replaced with barcode, the Chevron logo is retained

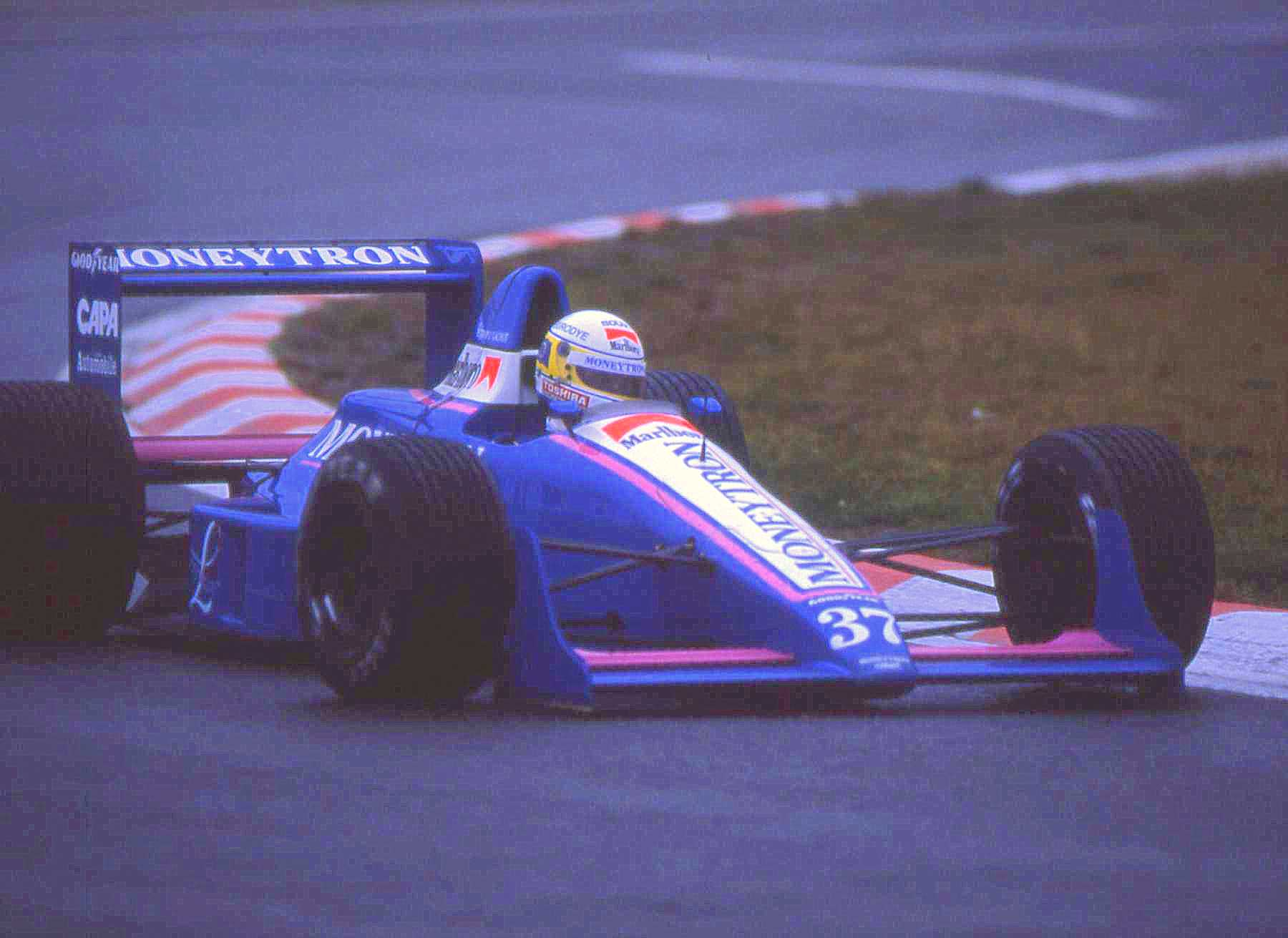
Bertrand Gachot at the 1989 Belgian Grand Prix

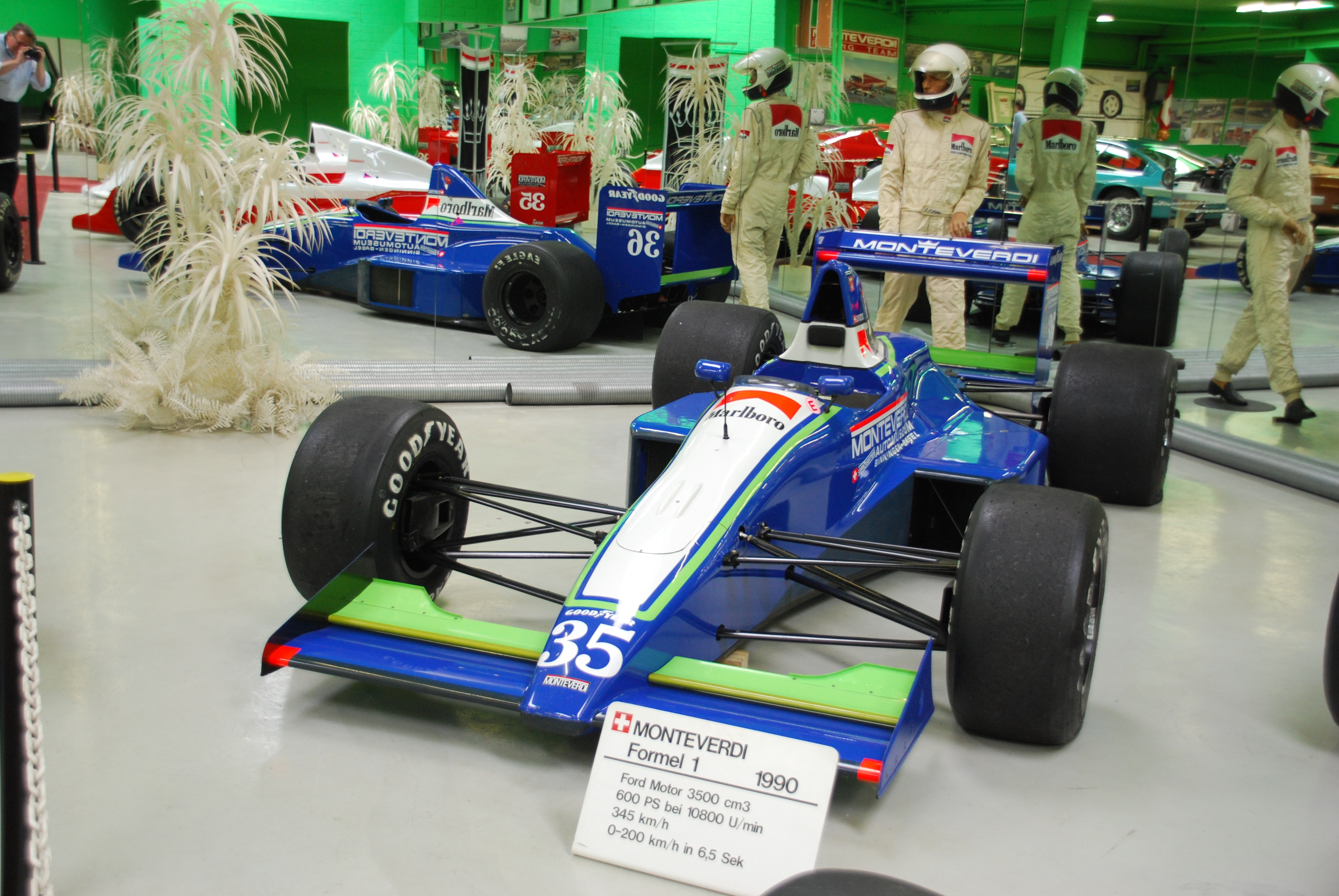
The Onyx ORE-1B from the 1990 season

== Osella ==
Year	Main colour(s)	Additional colour(s)	Main sponsor(s)	Additional major sponsor(s)
1980	White	Blue	MS	Denim, Goodyear, Sachs, Ferodo, Mobil 1, Motul, Pioneer, Saima Avandero
1981	White	Blue, Red	Denim	Goodyear, Alpilatte, Caref
1982	White	Blue, Light Blue	Denim	Pirelli, Saima Avandero, Pioneer
1983	Blue	White	Kelemata	Carvico, Sanpi, Alfa Romeo, Vaccari
1984	Blue	Red, Black	Kelemata	Carvico, Pirelli, Champion, Milde Sorte, Brembo, Ferodo, Sol, Victor, Emco
1985	Blue	White, Black	Kelemata	Agip, Micromax, Victor, Magneti Marelli, Pirelli
1986	Blue	White, Black, Yellow	Landis & Gyr, Mase Generators, Orizzonte Piemonte, René Lezard	Financial Trust Co., Pirelli, Master Sport, Bocchini, Agip, Carvico, Edmondo Costruzioni
1987	Black	Yellow	Stievani (an electrodomestic emporium from Turin), Rosa dei Mobili (a furniture emporium from Turin)	Arpo, North Pole, Fondmetal
1988	Black	Yellow, White	Stievani, Rosa	Arpo, North Pole, Fondmetal, Agip
1989	White	Red, Black	Fondmetal	Rosa, Sirena, Magneti Marelli, Tardito
1990	Black	Orange, Red	Fondmetal	Sirena, Arpo, SPAL, Tardito, Rosa

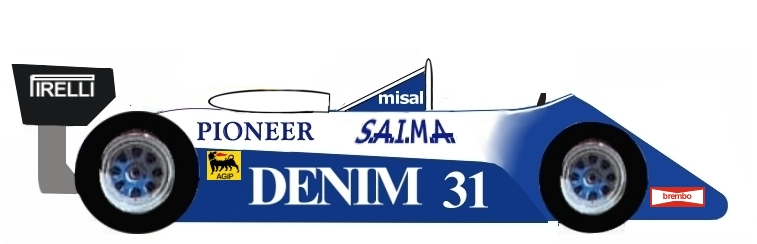
An Osella FA1c from 1982

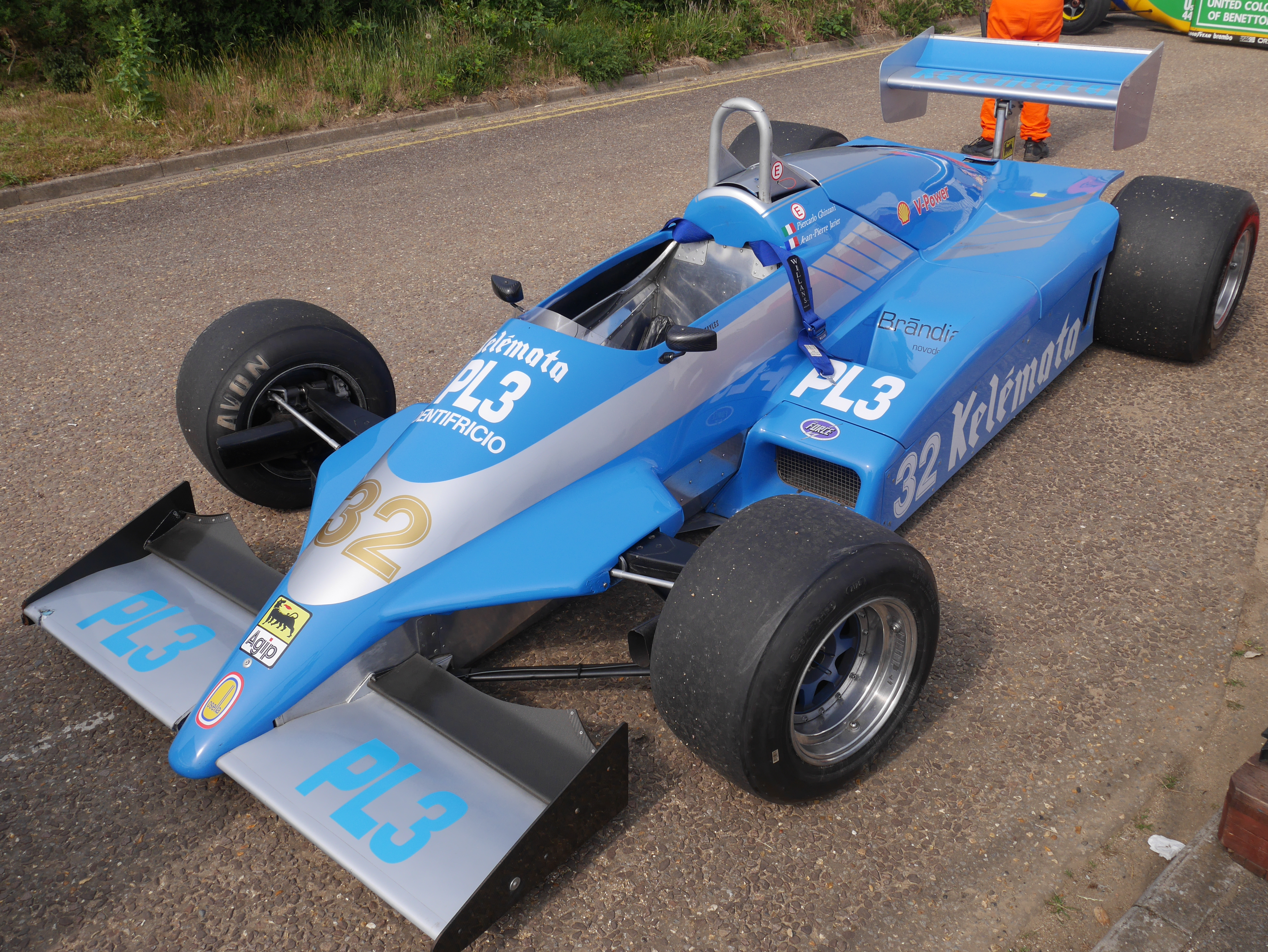
An Osella FA1d from the 1983 season in Bournemouth

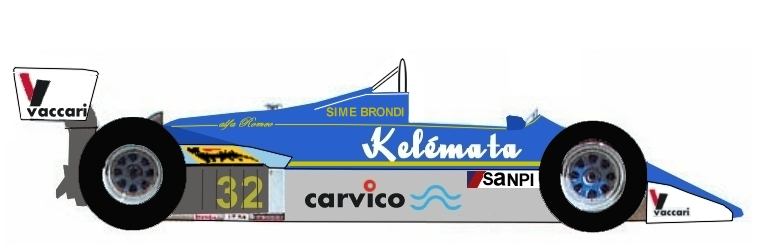
An Osella FA1E from 1983

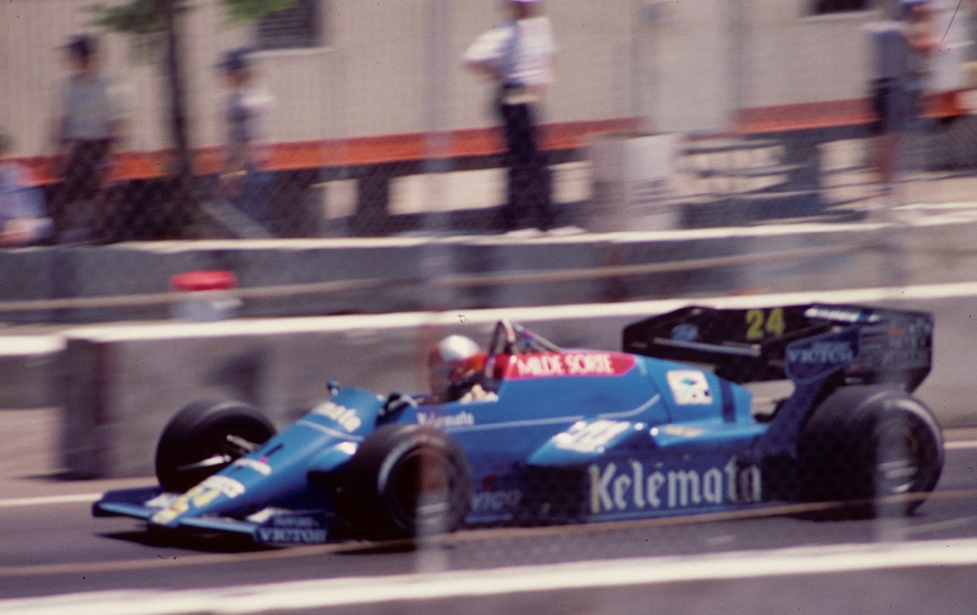
Piercarlo Ghinzani racing in the 1984 Dallas GP

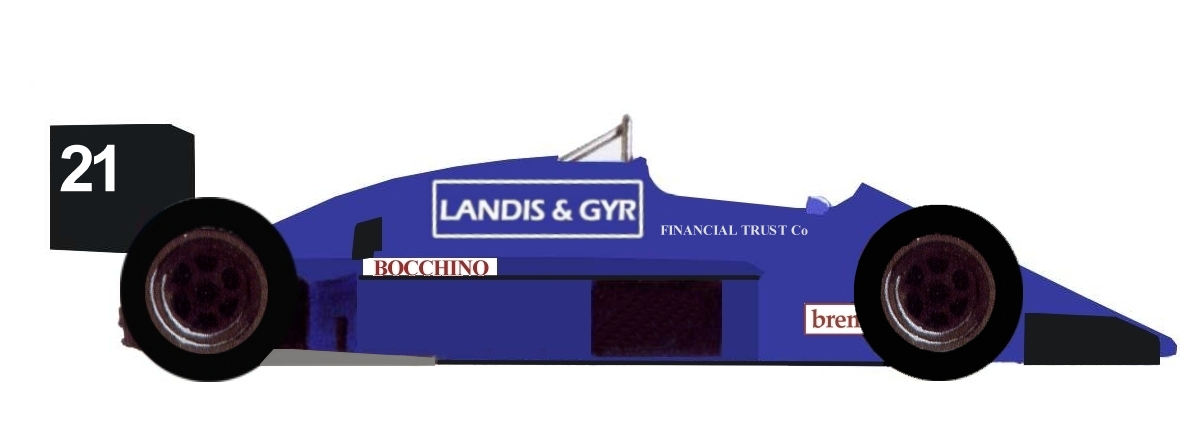
An Osella FA1G from 1986

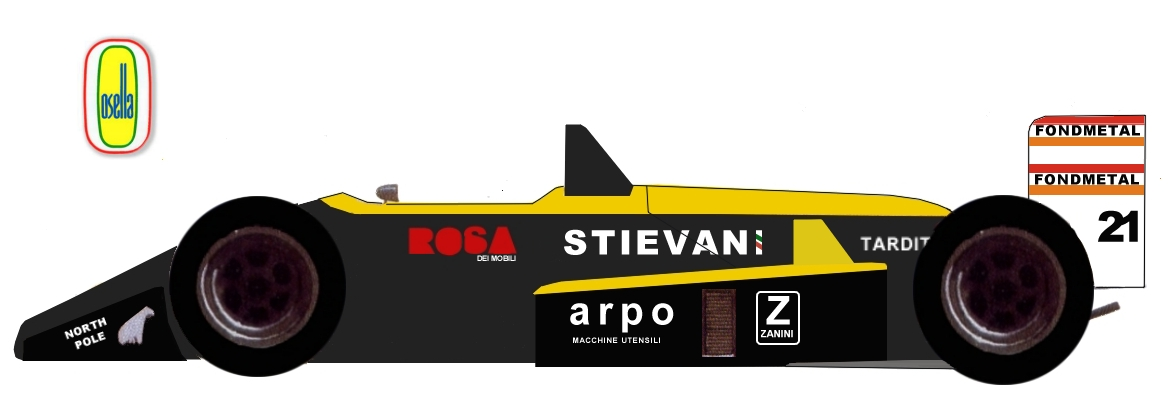
An Osella FA1L from 1988

== Pacific ==
Year	Main colour(s)	Additional colour(s)	Main sponsor(s)	Additional major sponsor(s)	Non-tobacco/alcohol livery changes(s)
1994	Silver	Blue, Pink	Igol Lubrificants, Ursus	Elf Aquitaine, systran, Goodyear	Ursus logo was removed
1995	Blue	Light Blue, Dark Green, Yellow, Black	Ursus, Synthèse Universelle, Franck Muller	Elf Aquitaine, ITS Ceramiche, RDA management consultants, Air Sicilia, Interflora, Igol Lubrifiants, Ford, brummel, Catamaran Watches, Marie Formigari, Ito En Seleb, Quest, Euromik, Godard, Hewlett Packard, Antera	Ursus logo was removed

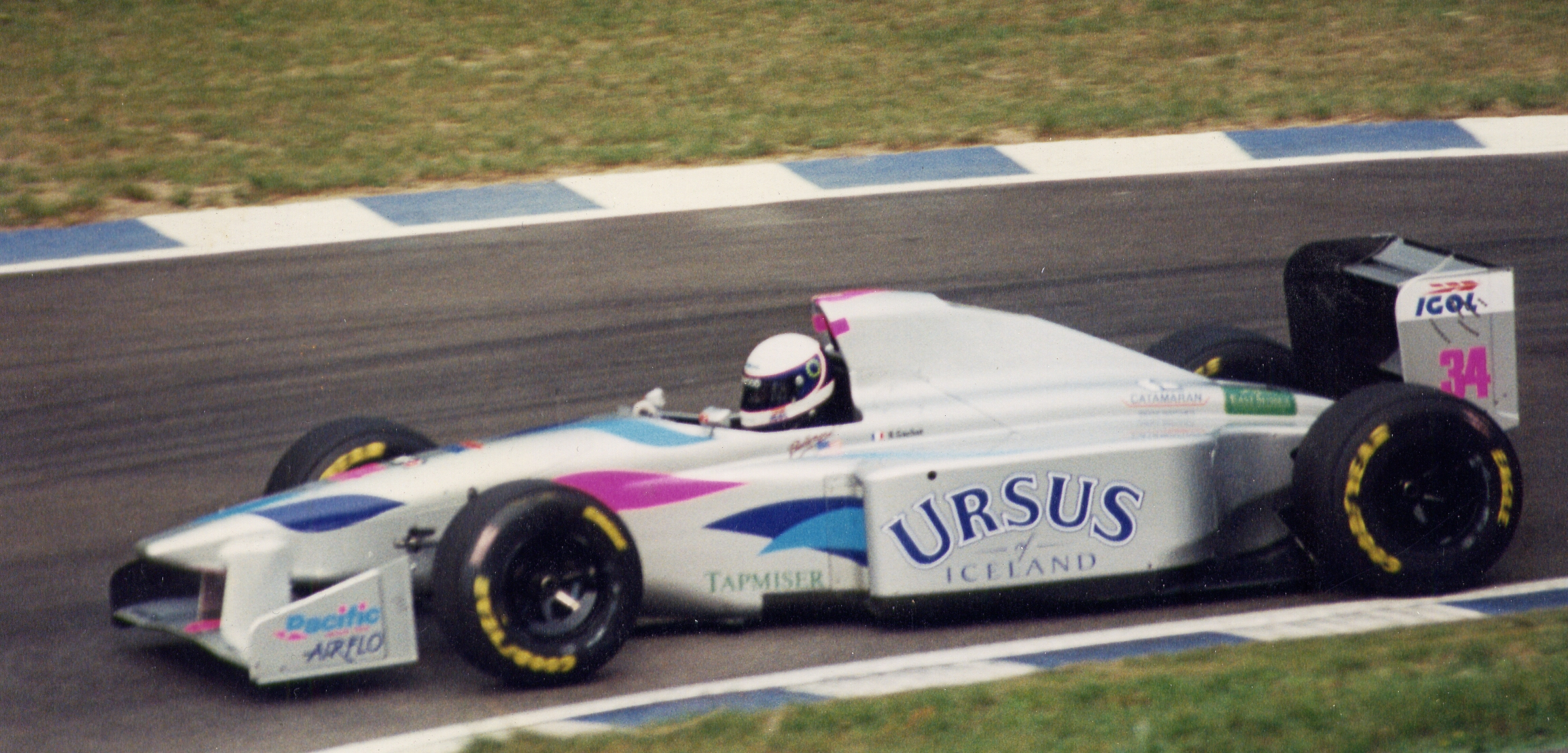
Bertrand Gachot driving his Pacific in 1994

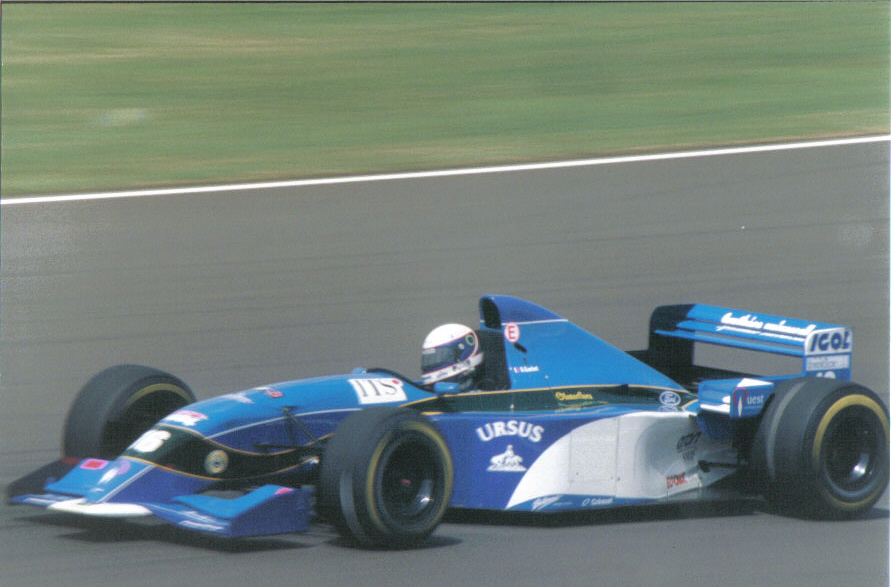
Bertrand Gachot racing for Pacific at the 1995 British Grand Prix

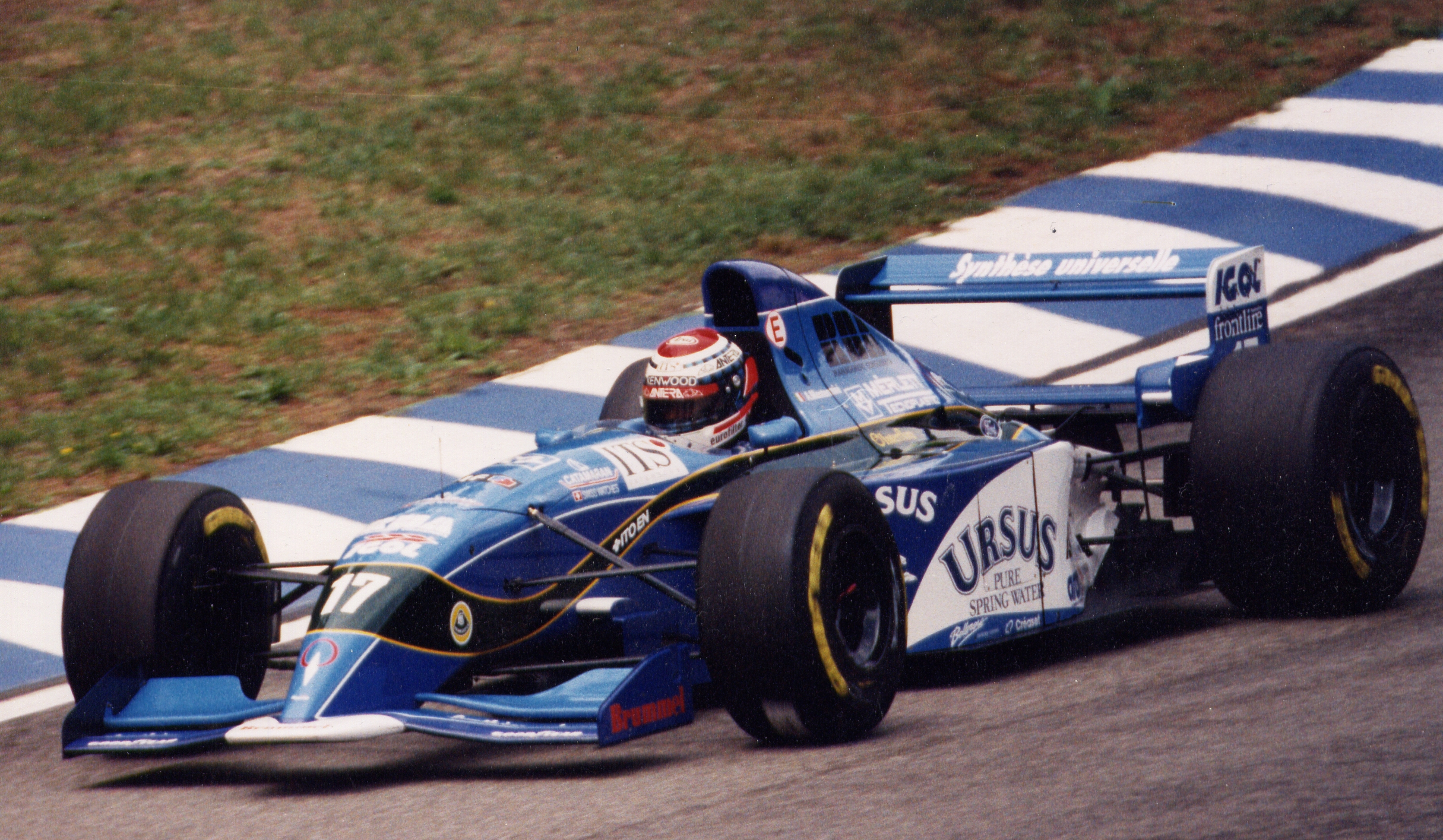
Andrea Montermini driving for Pacific at the 1995 German Grand Prix

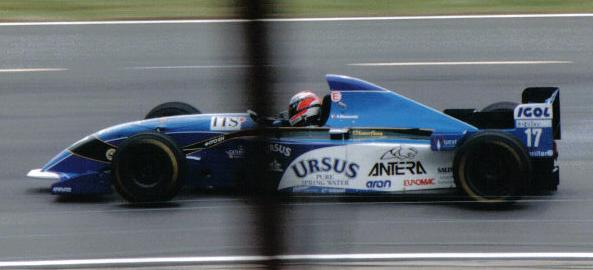
Andrea Montermini driving at the 1995 British Grand Prix

== Penske ==
Penske competed in the Formula One World Championship as a chassis constructor from 1974 to 1977 and as a works team from 1974 to 1976 and maintained its team's livery and sponsors throughout its three seasons competing in Formula One as a team.

Year	Main colour(s)	Additional colour(s)	Main sponsor(s)	Additional major sponsor(s)	Notes
1974–1976	White	Red, Blue	First National City Travelers Checks	Goodyear, Sunoco, Norton, Spirit	A US flag as a mark of the team's nationality.

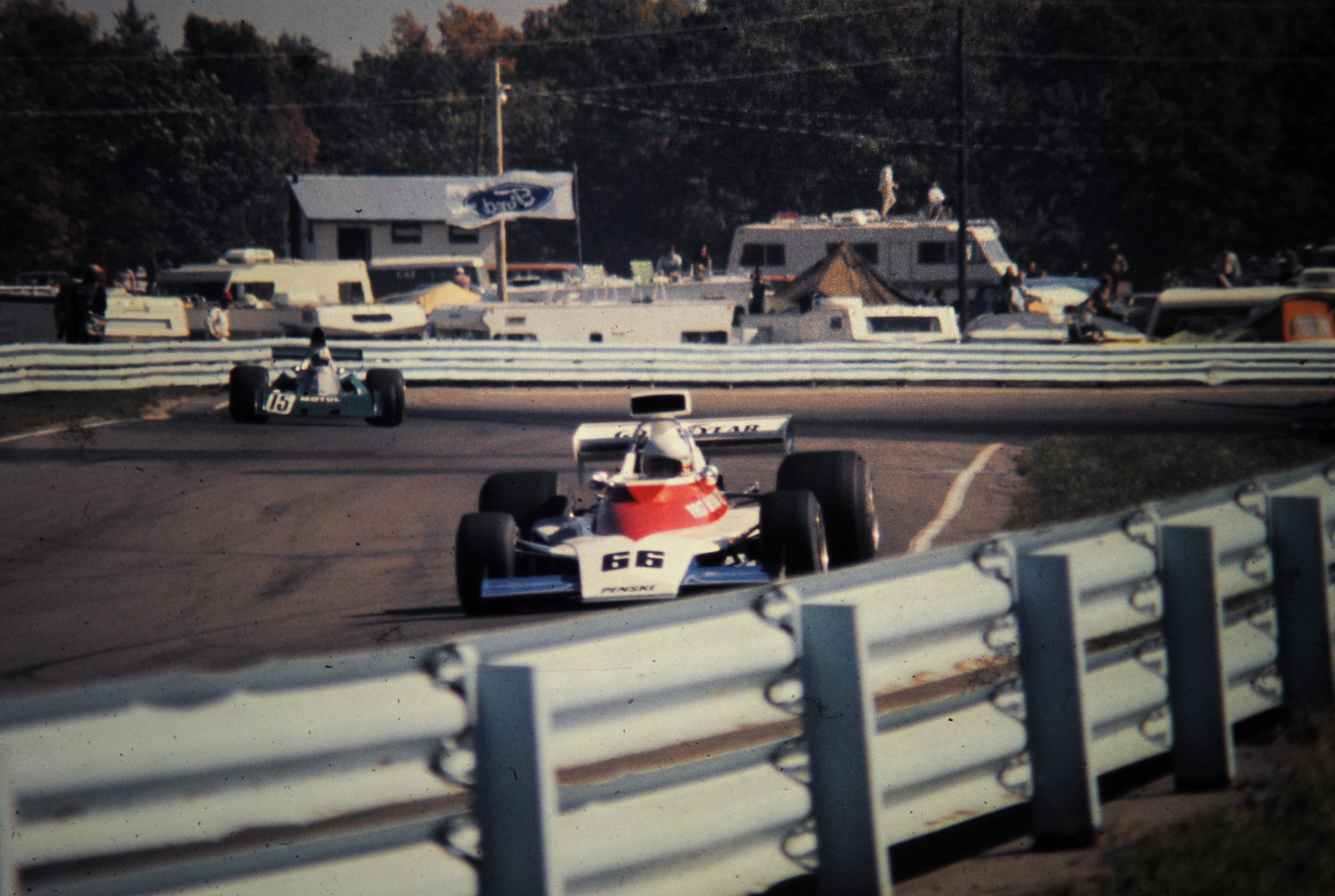
Mark Donohue driving the Penske PC1 at the 1974 United States Grand Prix.

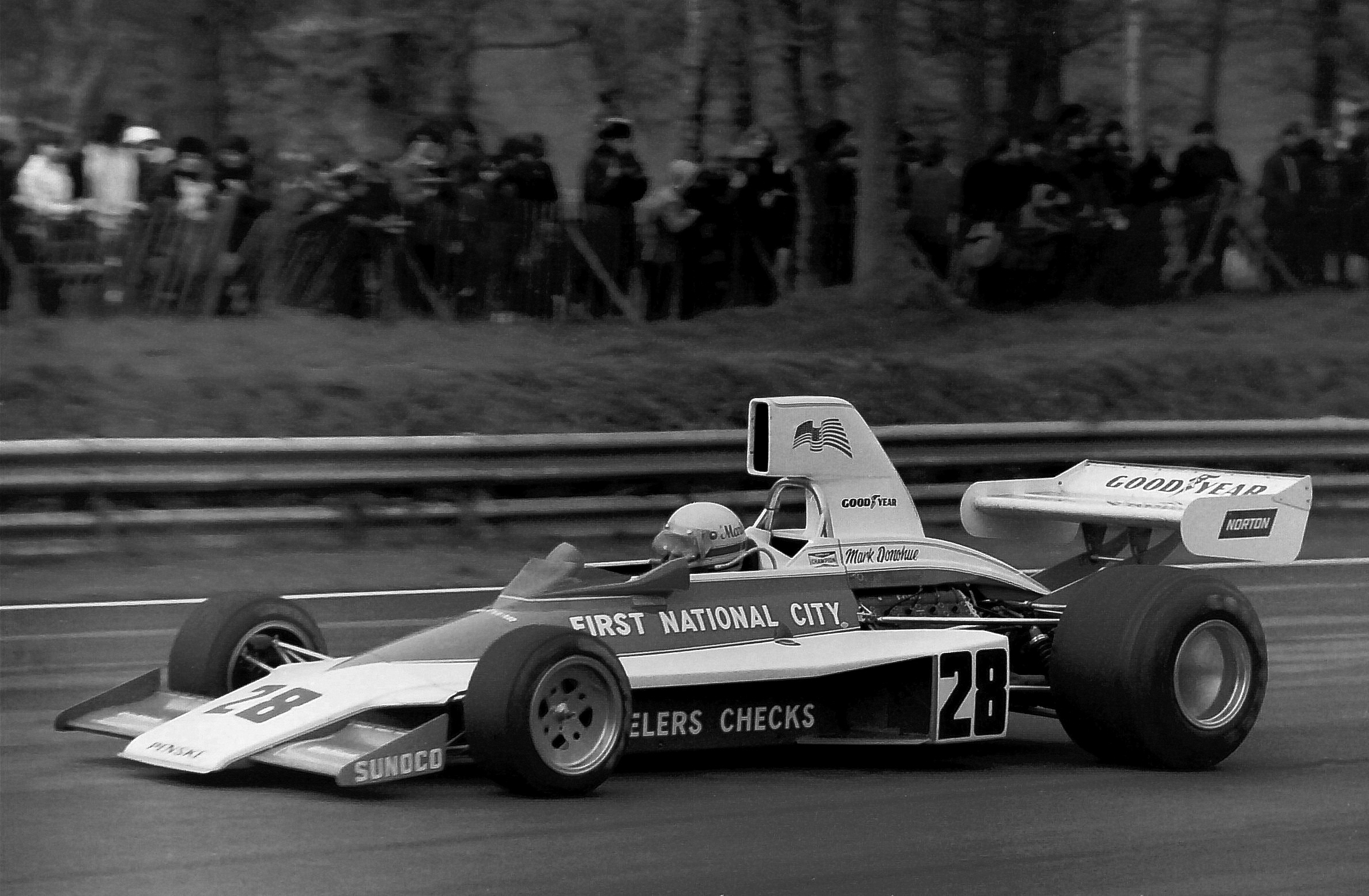
Mark Donohue driving the Penske PC1 at the 1975 Race of Champions.

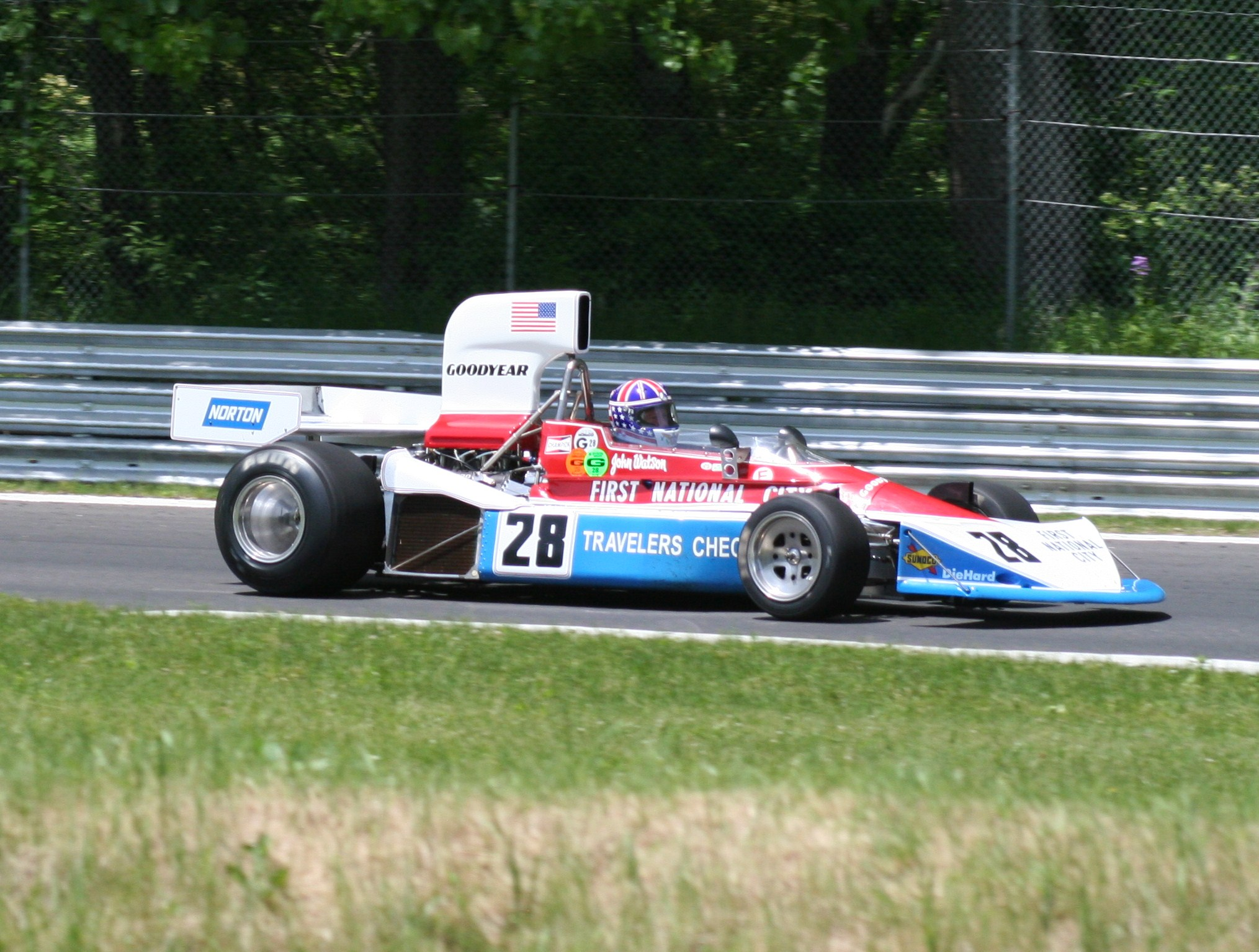
Ex-John Watson Penske PC3 being raced in a Historic Grand Prix at Lime Rock Park in May 2009.

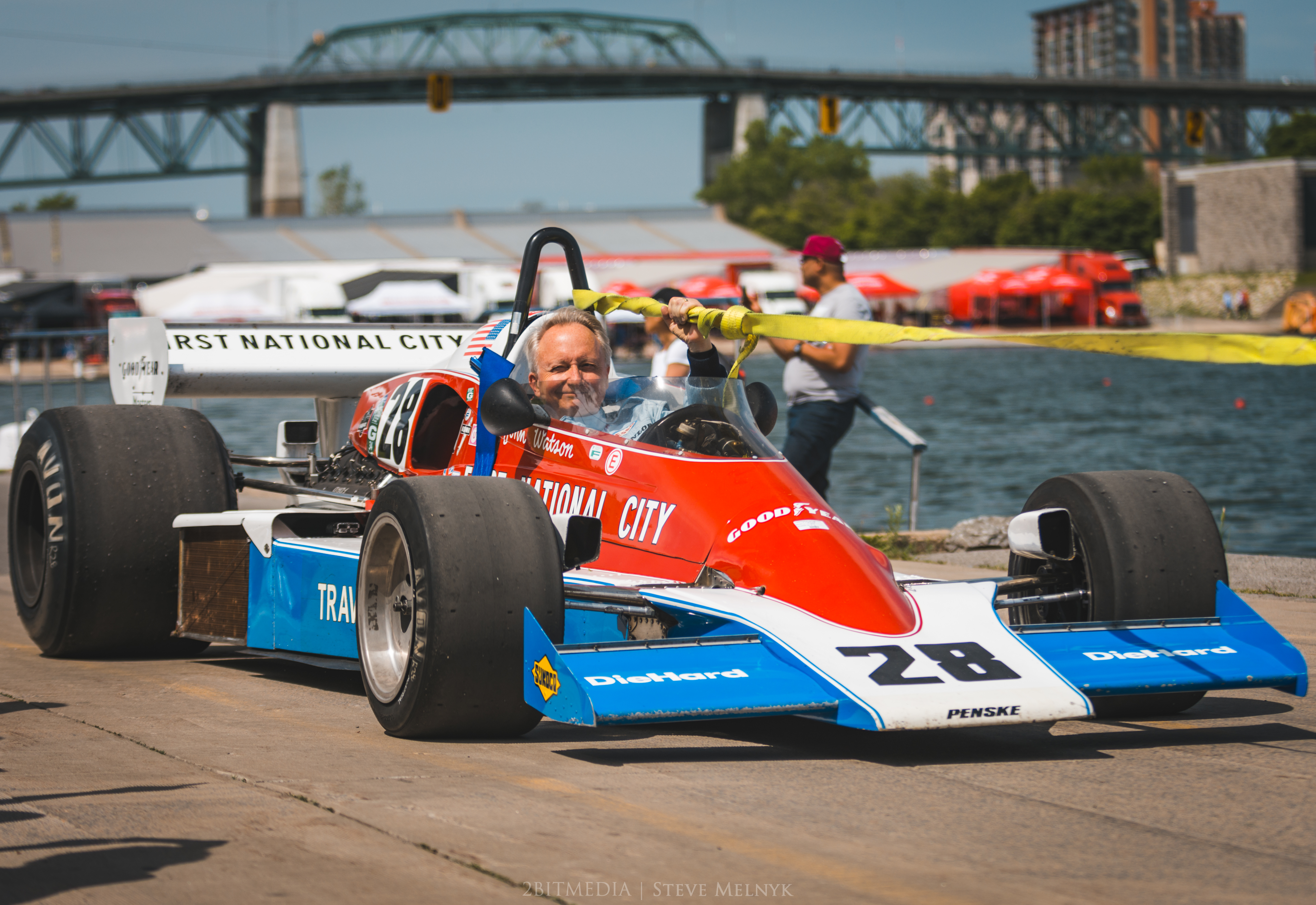
A Penske PC4 at Circuit Gilles Villeneuve for the 2017 FIA Masters Historic Formula One Championship.

== Prost ==
Prost competed in Formula One for five seasons, with similar liveries in each season, despite changing sponsors.

Year	Main colour(s)	Additional colour(s)	Main sponsor(s)	Additional major sponsor(s)	Non-tobacco/alcohol livery changes
1997–2000	Blue	Black	Gauloises, PlayStation, Yahoo! (2000), AGFA	Société Bic, Mugen (1997), Elf Aquitaine (1997), Alcatel (1997–1999), Showa (1997), Peugeot (1998–2000), Total (1998–2000), Sodexho (1999–2000), Catia Solutions, Canal+ (1997–1999), Bridgestone, New Man (1999–2000), Giordana (1997), LVS (1997–1998)	Gauloises was removed or changed to "bar code" or to Alcatel at the 1998 French GP, British GP and German GP
2001	Blue	Red	Prost Grand Prix, PSN, Acer	Dark Dog, Parmalat, Adecco, Brastemp, Česká pojišt'ovna, Catia Solutions, Magneti Marelli, Michelin, Altran, New Man	

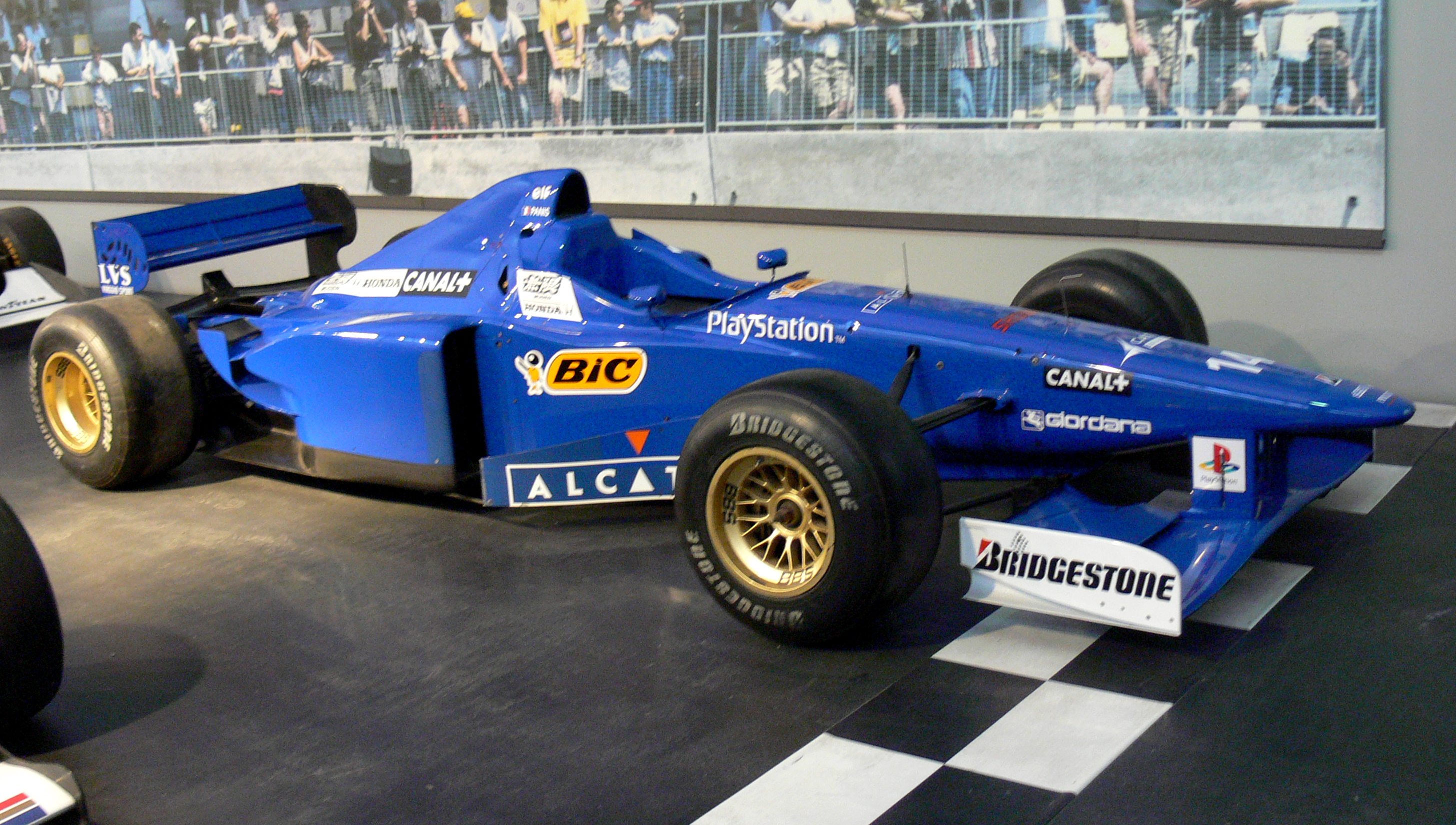
During its existence, the Prost team maintained a traditional French blue livery. This is a Prost JS45 from the 1997 season in display

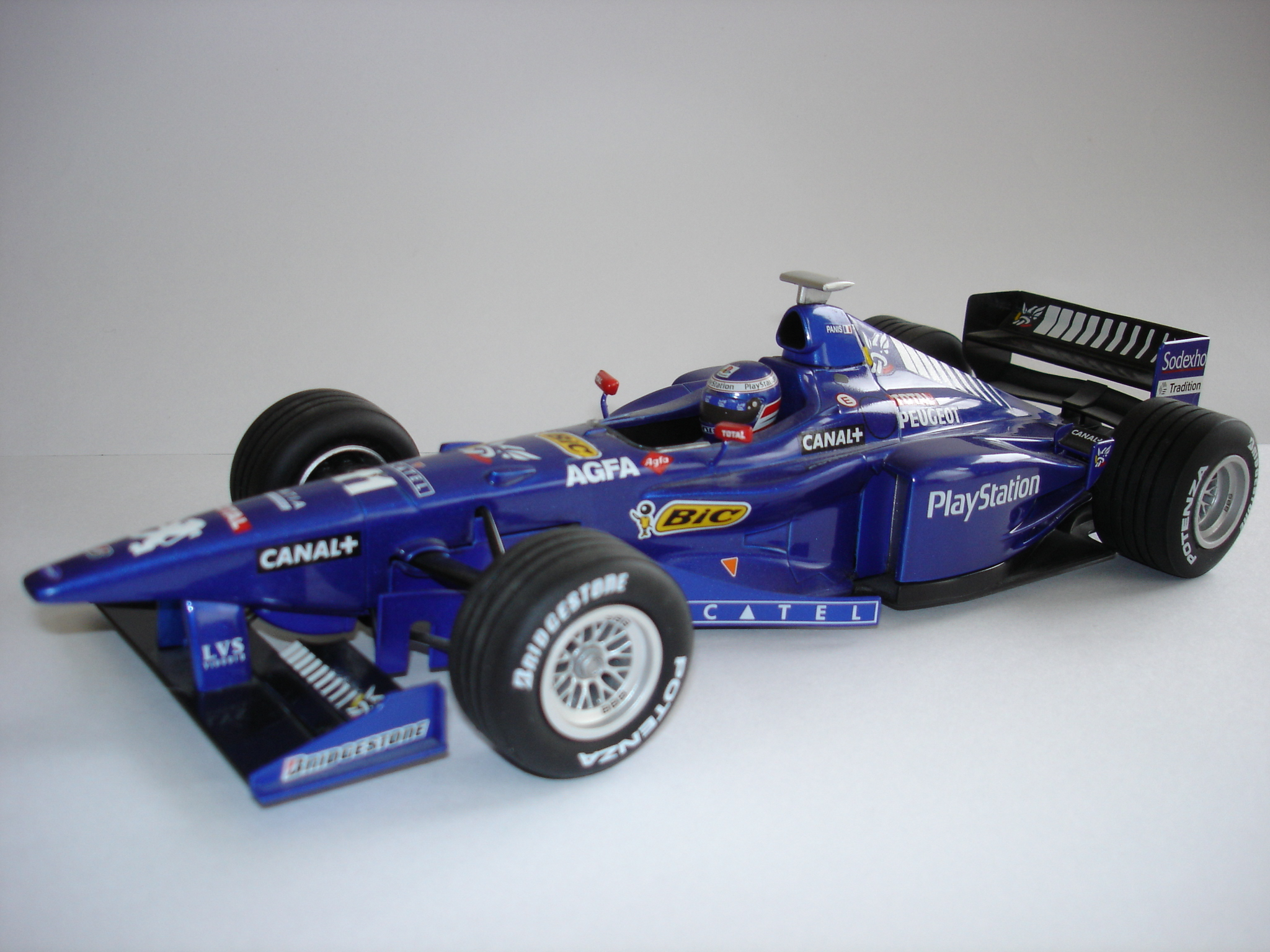
A Prost AP01 model kit in its non-tobacco livery (to be noticed the barcodes) at 1998 French GP, British GP and German GP

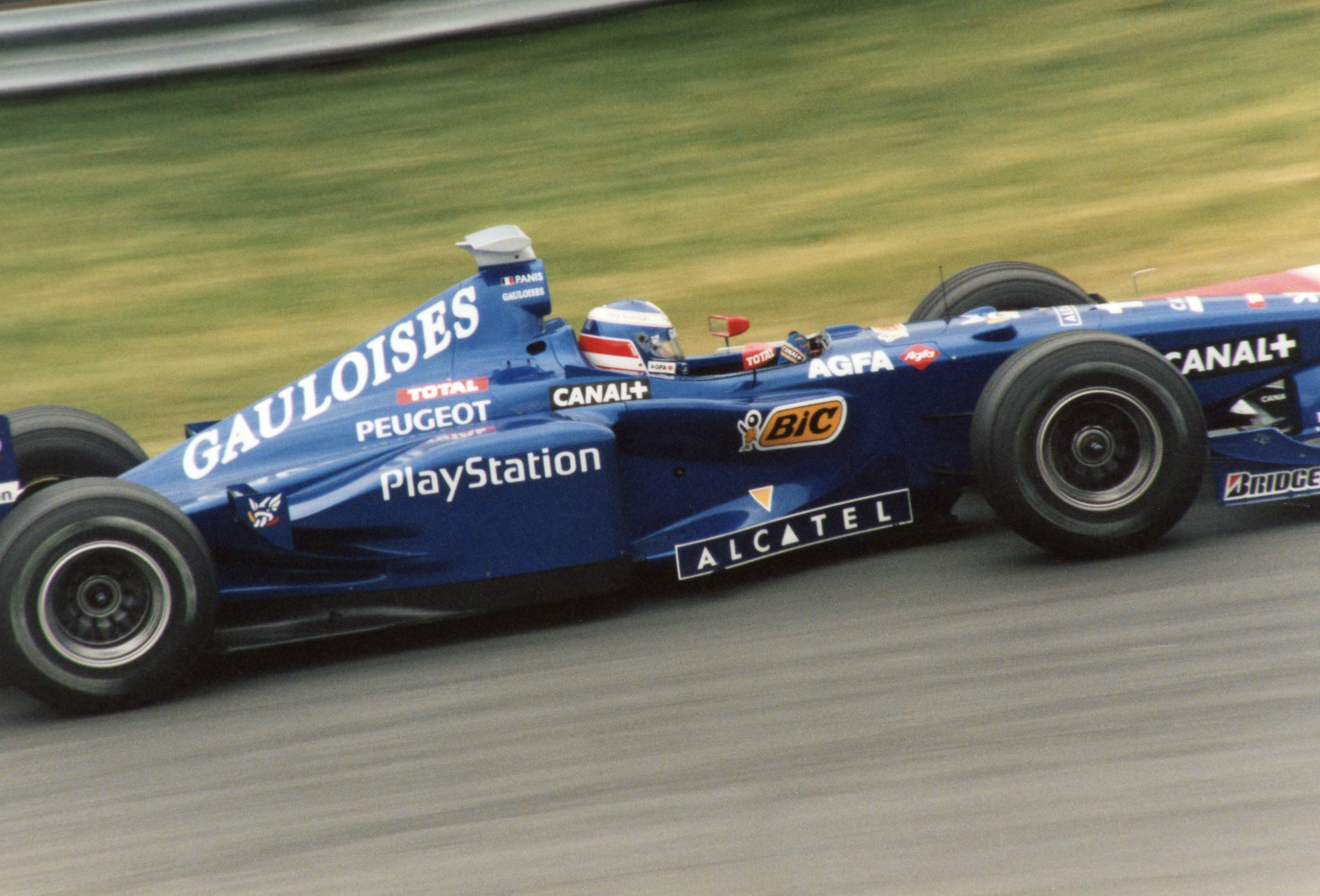
Olivier Panis driving the Prost AP01 at the 1998 Canadian Grand Prix.

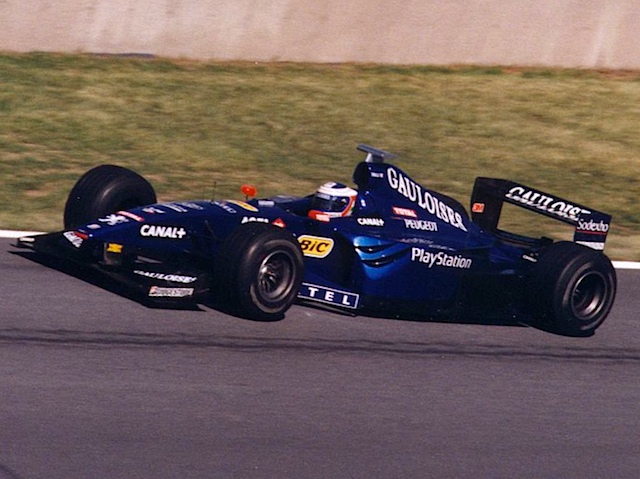
Jarno Trulli driving the Prost AP02 at the 1999 Canadian GP

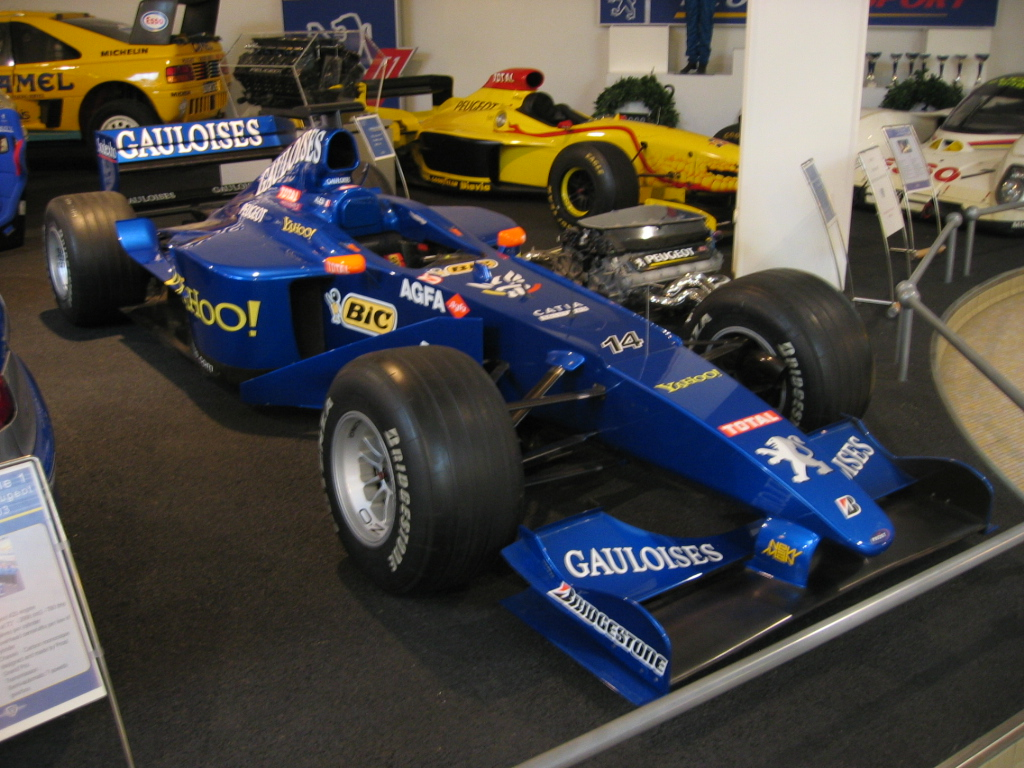
In the 2000 season, Yahoo entered as a sponsor for Prost

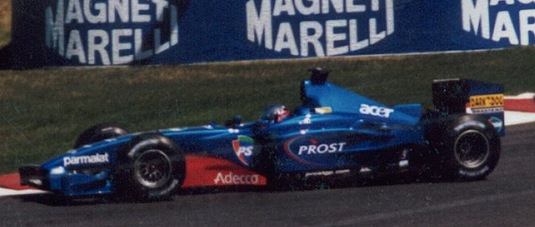
After a disastrous 2000 season, many of Prost's sponsors withdrew their support. As a result, the team had to put its team logo on the sidepods for 2001, as it lacked a title sponsor.

== RAM ==
Year	Main colour(s)	Additional colour(s)	Main sponsor(s)	Additional major sponsor(s)
1976–1983	See Brabham / March			
1984	White	Green	Skoal Bandit	Rizla+, Sitev, Contesse Barry, Newsweek
1985	White	Green	Skoal Bandit	Rizla+, Sitev, Conte of Florence, Newsweek, Rizla+, Pirelli

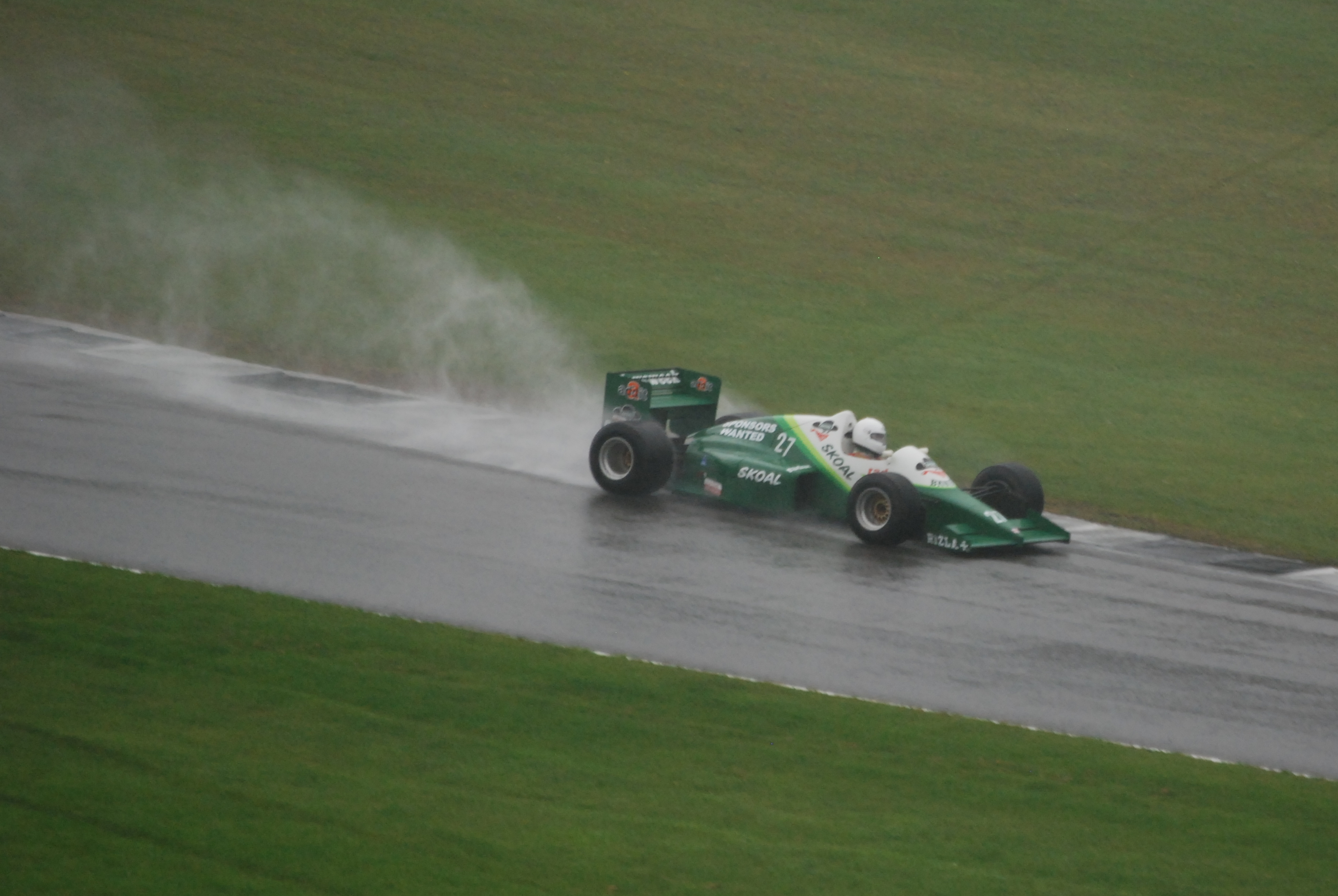
A RAM being tested at Donington

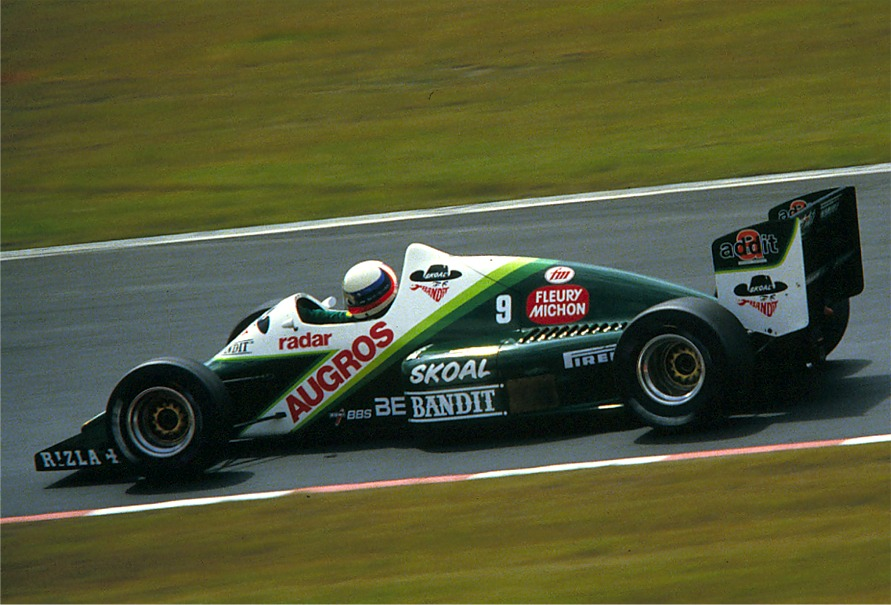
Manfred Winkelhock driving for RAM in 1985

== Racing Bulls ==
The team traces its roots back to Minardi (formed in 1985). Minardi was bought over by Red Bull in 2006 and was reformed as Scuderia Toro Rosso as a junior team to Red Bull Racing (RBR). In 2020, Toro Rosso was rebranded as Scuderia AlphaTauri to promote Red Bull's fashion brand of the same name while becoming the sister team to RBR. In 2024, AlphaTauri was rebranded as RB and signed Visa and Cash App as co-title sponsors to enter the season as Visa Cash App RB Formula One Team (shortened as VCARB). In 2025, the RB name was expanded to Racing Bulls.

Year	Main colour(s)	Additional colour(s)	Main sponsor(s)	Additional major sponsor(s)	Special liveries
2024	Blue, White	Silver, Red, Black	Red Bull, Visa, Cash App	Pirelli, Ravenol, Tudor Watches, XMTrading, NEFT Vodka, HRC/Honda, Epicor, PKN Orlen, Hugo Boss	RB raced a special Chameleon Card livery for the 2024 Miami Grand Prix. The livery was also applied on RB's F1 Academy driver Amna Al Qubaisi's car for the Miami round. For the Singapore Grand Prix, a denim livery designed by sponsor Hugo was utilised.
2025–2026	White	Blue, Red, Yellow, Black	Red Bull, Visa, Cash App	Pirelli, HRC/Honda (2025), Ford Racing (2026), Dynatrace, Tudor Watches, Student.com/Yugo, NEFT Vodka, Epicor, Hugo Boss, Mobil, Hahn Air, Octave (2026), Confluent (2026), Nouryon (2026), XMTrading, RebelDot	Special liveries were used at the Miami Grand Prix that promoted Red Bull's Summer editions.

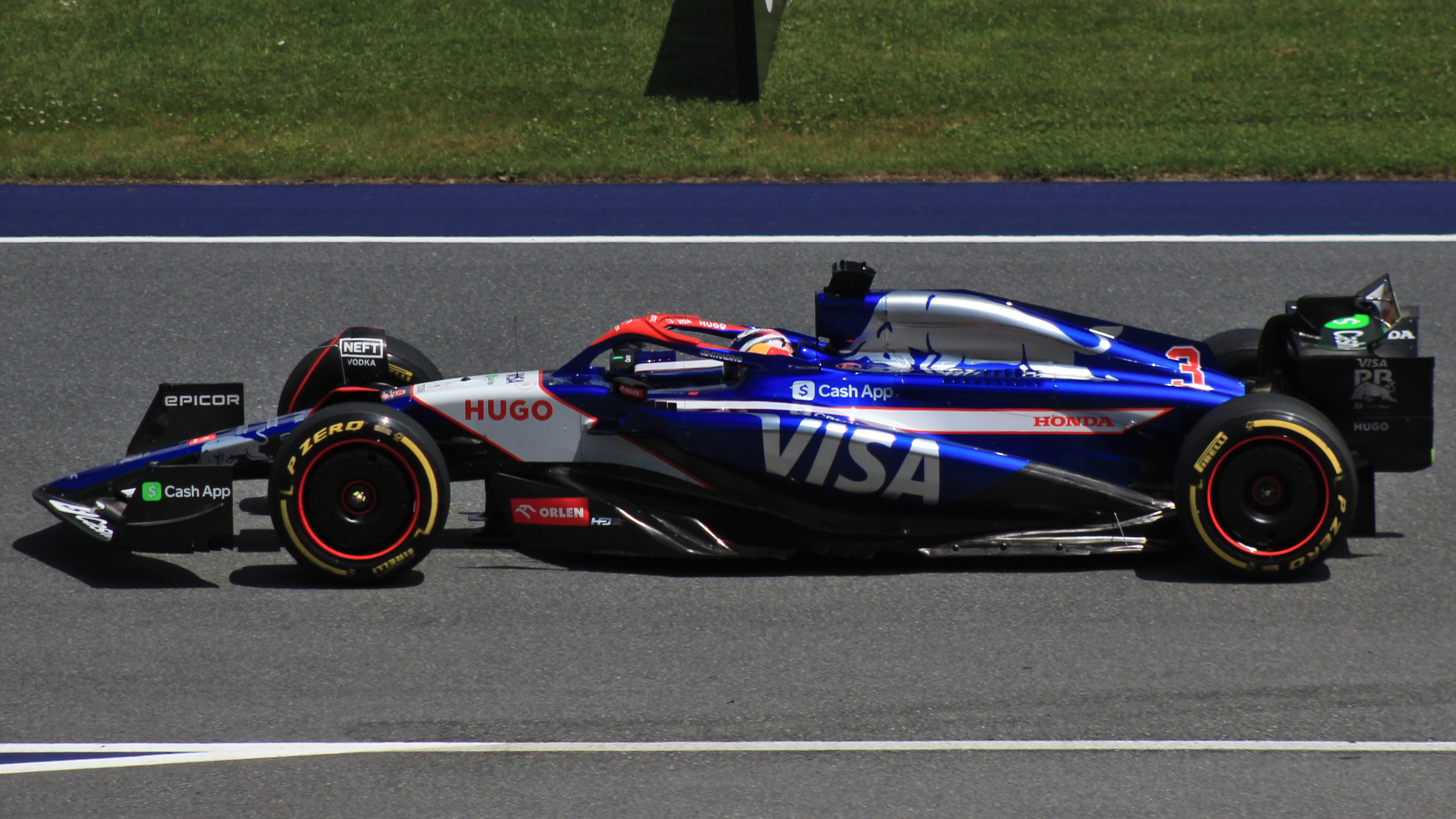
Daniel Ricciardo driving the RB VCARB 01 at the 2024 Austrian Grand Prix.

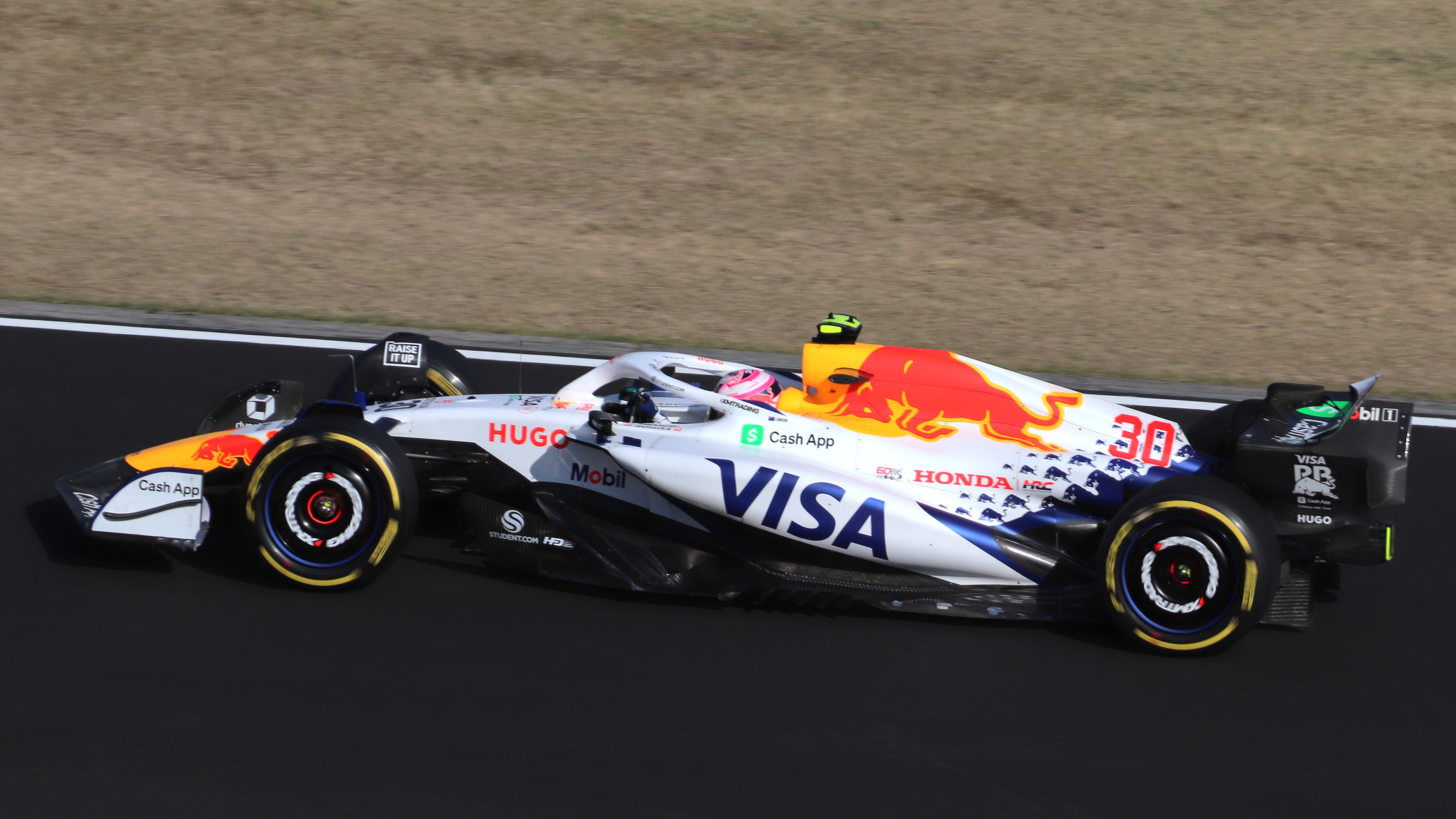
Liam Lawson driving the RB VCARB 02 at the 2025 Japanese Grand Prix.

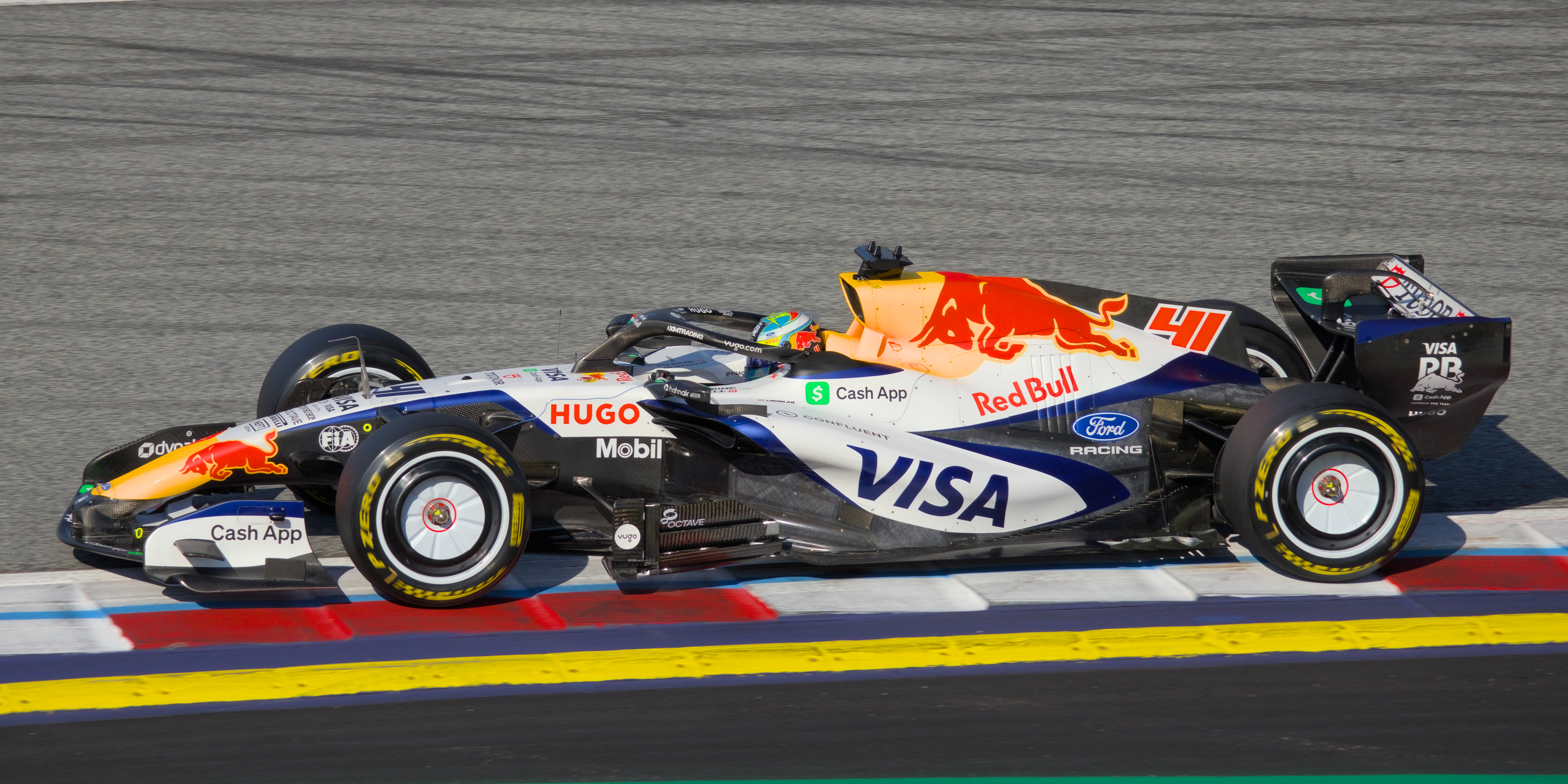
Arvid Lindblad driving the RB VCARB 03 at the 2026 Austrian Grand Prix

== Racing Point ==
In 2018, Canadian billionaire Lawrence Stroll led a consortium to buy Force India, which was placed in administration after 11 years in the sport, and entered 2019 as Racing Point. For 2021, the team was rebranded as Aston Martin after Stroll bought a 16.7% stake in Aston Martin Lagonda.

Year	Main colour(s)	Additional colour(s)	Main sponsor(s)	Additional major sponsor(s)
2019	Pink, Blue	White, Magenta, Grey	SportPesa, BWT	Hackett London, Claro, Telcel, Infinitum, NEC, Alpinestars, Pirelli, JCB, Acronis, Univa, Canada Life, Bombardier, Ravenol
2020	Pink	White, Magenta	BWT	Hackett London, Claro, Telcel, Infinitum, Alpinestars, Pirelli, JCB, Univa, Canada Life, Bombardier, IFS, ZhongAn, Ravenol, Acronis

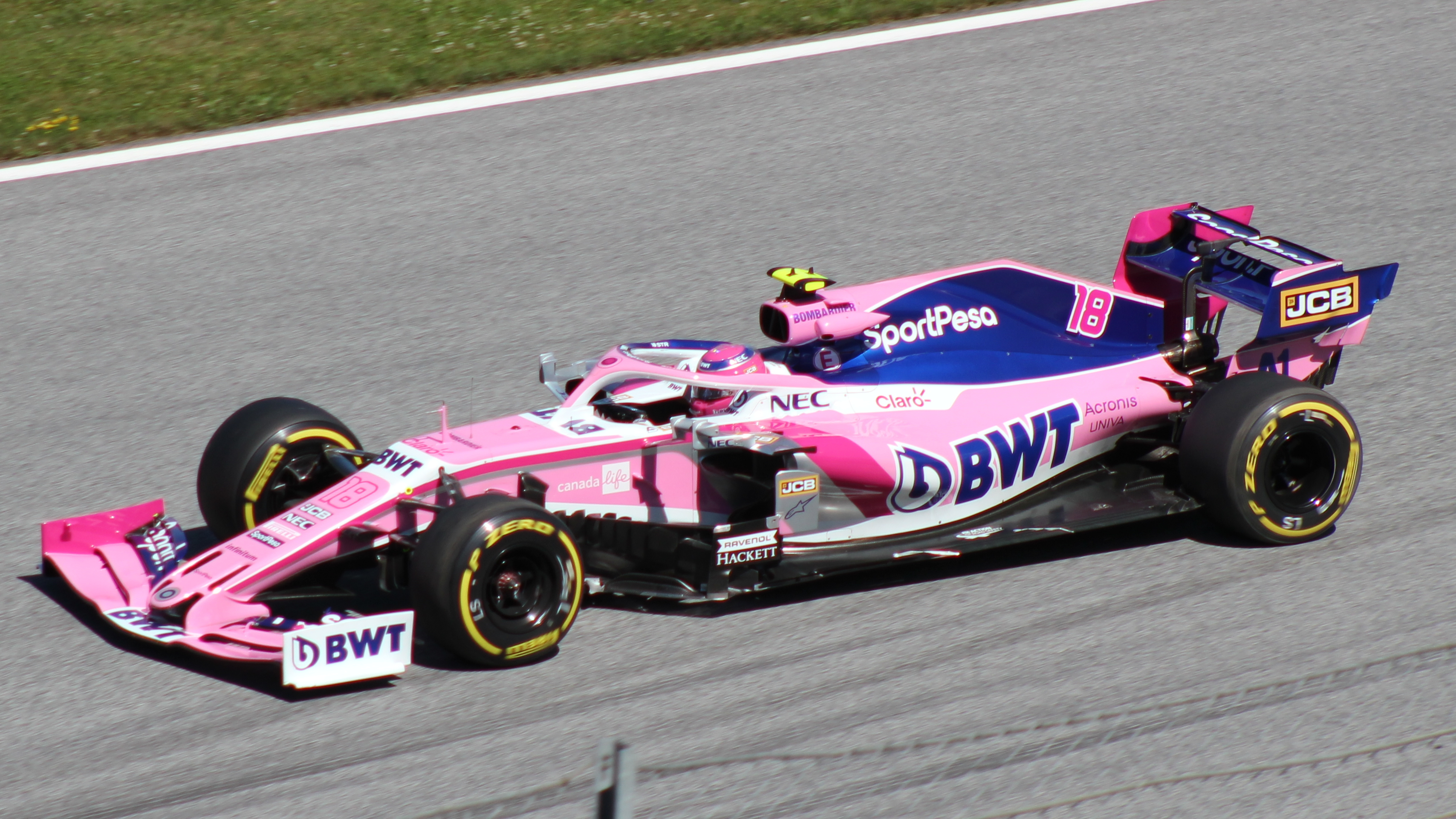
Lance Stroll driving the Racing Point RP19 at the 2019 Austrian Grand Prix.

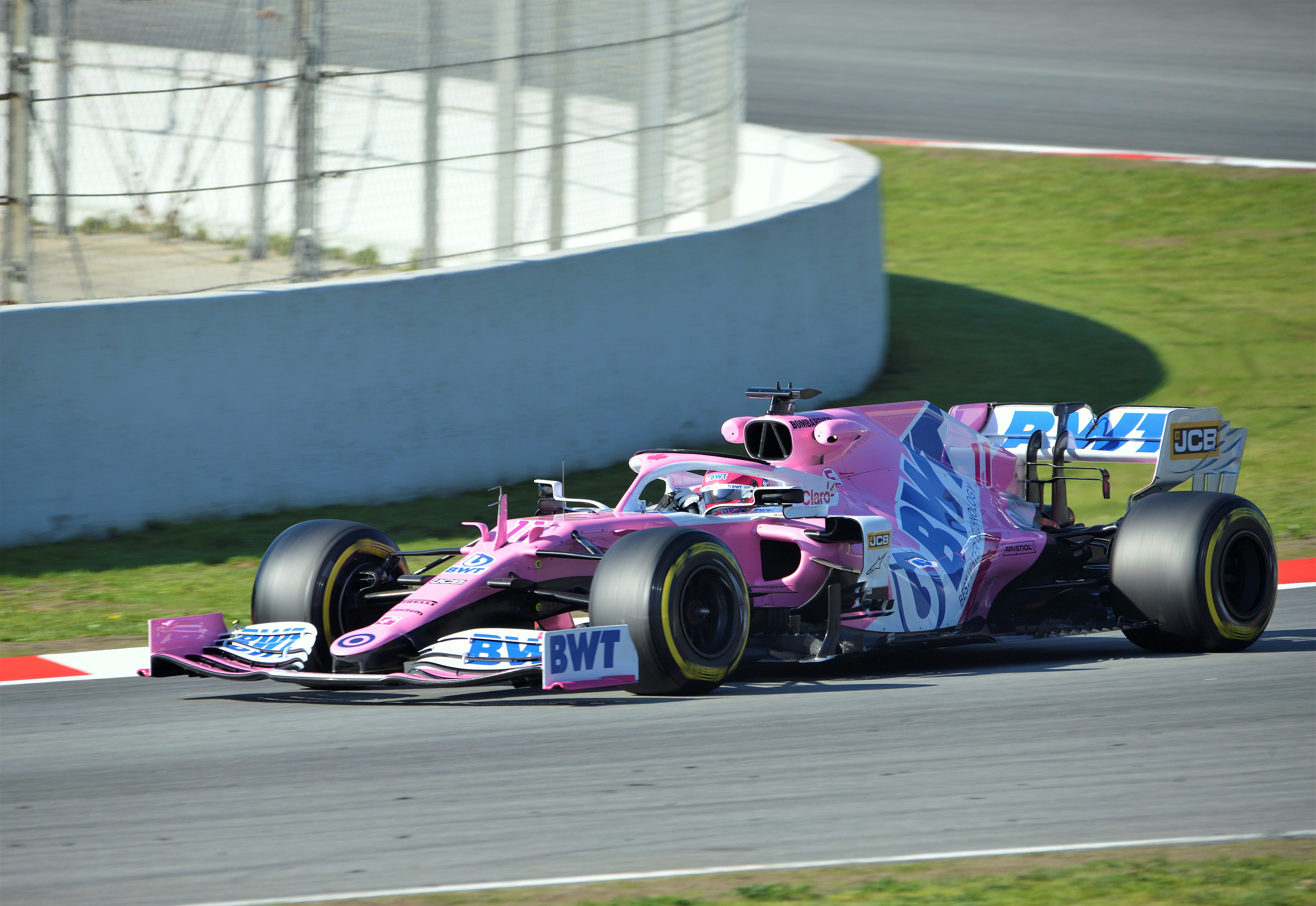
Sergio Pérez testing the Racing Point RP20 at the Circuit de Barcelona-Catalunya.

== Rebaque ==
Rebaque is the only Mexican team in F1 to date. Named after its driver Héctor Rebaque, it always raced with a brown and gold livery.

Year	Main colour(s)	Additional colour(s)	Main sponsor(s)	Additional major sponsor(s)
1978	Brown	Gold	None	None
1979	Brown	Gold	Carta Blanca, Marlboro	None
1980	Black	Gold	Carta Blanca, Marlboro, Castrol, Lucky Strike	Magneti Marelli, Shell, Champion

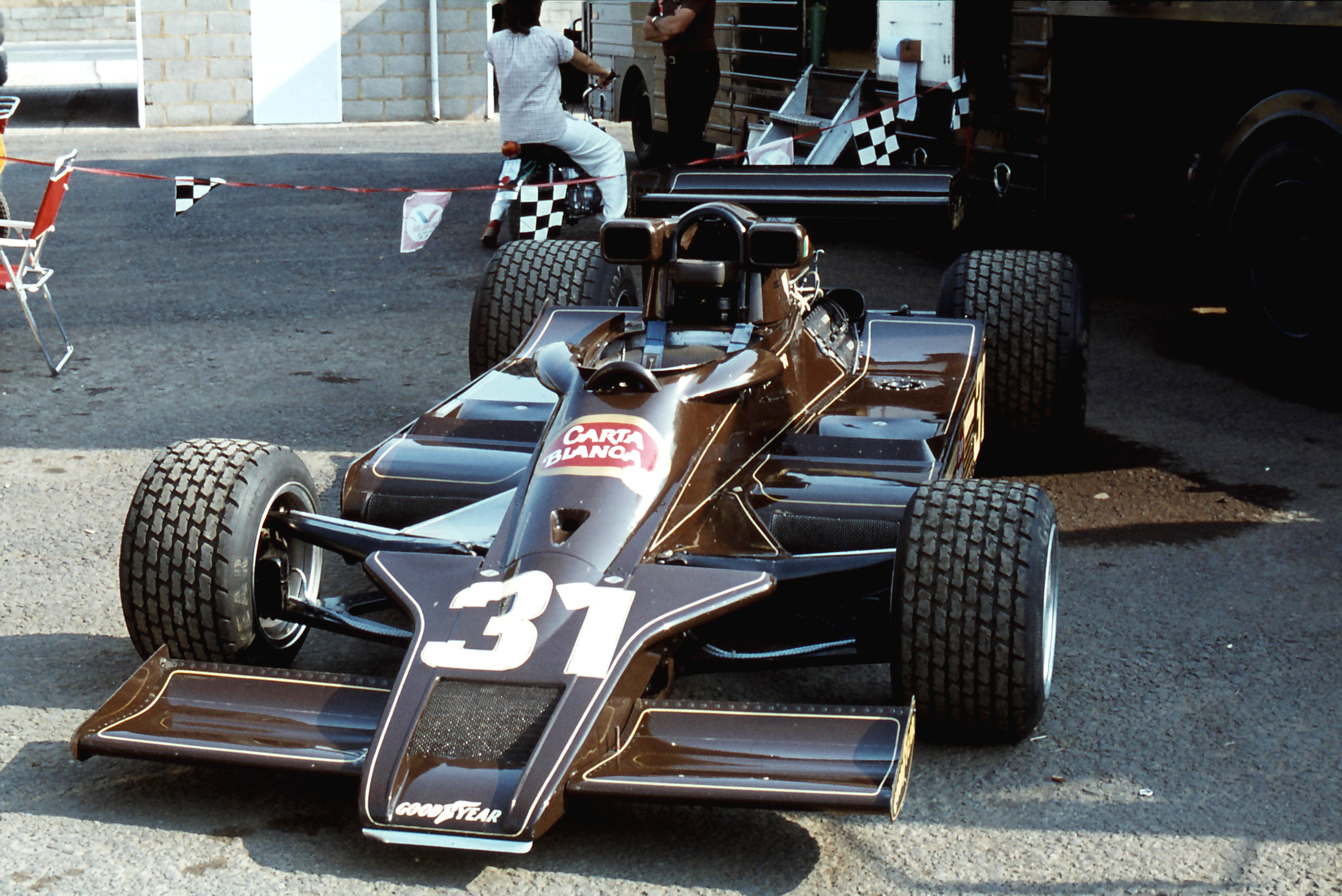
Hector Rebaque's Lotus 78 from the 1979 British Grand Prix.

== Red Bull Racing ==
Jaguar Racing was renamed Red Bull Racing after the former was bought from Ford on 15 November 2004 by the energy drink company. Red Bull's involvement in Formula One dates back to 1995, when it first sponsored the Sauber team. The deal with Sauber lasted until the end of the 2004 season.

Since its first season in 2005 the car livery did not change much, always keeping Red Bull as the main sponsor. This changed in 2013, when Infiniti became the team's title sponsor and Red Bull's branding on the car was reduced.

Red Bull have used special liveries on multiple occasions, supporting the release of upcoming films and company's charity program Wings for Life.

Year	Main colour(s)	Additional colour(s)	Livery sponsor(s)	Additional major sponsor(s)	Special liveries
2005–2006	Dark Blue	Red, Yellow, Silver	Red Bull	Hangar-7, Metro International (2006), Rauch, Magneti Marelli (2006)	The team supported movies Star Wars: Episode III – Revenge of the Sith and Superman Returns at the 2005 and 2006 Monaco Grand Prix respectively.
2007	Dark Blue	Red, Yellow	Red Bull	Metro International, 7-Eleven, Rauch, Magneti Marelli	The team used special livery at the 2007 British Grand Prix to promote Wings for Life charity program.
2008	Dark Blue	Red, Yellow	Red Bull	Wings For Life, Renault, Magneti Marelli, Rauch, Siemens	The team used special livery at the 2008 Brazilian Grand Prix, highlighting David Coulthard's retirement from Formula One. Red Bull Racing received approval from the Fédération Internationale de l'Automobile, Formula One's governing body, to run Coulthard's car in different colours than his teammate Mark Webber.
2009	Dark Blue	Red, Yellow	Red Bull	Total, Renault, Magneti Marelli, Hangar-7, Red Bull Mobile, 7-Eleven, Rauch, Siemens	
2010	Dark Blue	Red, Yellow	Red Bull	Total, Renault, Pepe Jeans, Rauch, Red Bull Mobile, FXDD, 7-Eleven, Singha, LG, Servus TV, Speed Week, Siemens	
2011–2012	Dark Blue	Red, Yellow	Red Bull, Infiniti, Total	Rauch, Renault, Pepe Jeans, FXDD, Casio, Singha, Pirelli, Geox, SKY, Speed Week, Servus TV, Red Bulletin, Red Bull Mobile, Platform Computing, Siemens	The team used special Faces for Charity livery at the 2012 British Grand Prix, once again promoting Wings for Life.
2013	Dark Blue, Purple	Red, Yellow	Infiniti, Red Bull, Total	Rauch, Renault, Pepe Jeans, FXDD, Casio, Singha, Pirelli, Geox, SKY, Speed Week, Servus TV, Red Bulletin, Red Bull Mobile, Platform Computing, Siemens	
2014	Dark Blue, Purple	Red, Yellow	Infiniti, Red Bull, Total	Rauch, Renault, Pepe Jeans, FXDD, Casio, Singha, Pirelli, Speed Week, Servus TV, Red Bulletin, Red Bull Mobile, Geox, SKY, Platform Computing, Siemens, AT&T	
2015	Dark Blue, Purple	Red, Yellow	Infiniti, Red Bull, Total	Rauch, Renault, Pepe Jeans, Exness, Casio, Singha, Pirelli, Hisense, Speed Week, Servus TV, Red Bulletin, Red Bull Mobile, Platform Computing, Siemens, AT&T	In pre-season testing, a camouflage livery was used.
2016	Navy Blue	Red, Yellow	Red Bull, Total	Rauch, Pepe Jeans, Exness, TAG Heuer, Pirelli, Hisense, Puma, Siemens, AT&T, Aston Martin, Platform Computing, Speed Week, Servus TV, Red Bulletin, Red Bull Mobile	During wet tyre testing at Paul Ricard, "Infiniti" on the Red Bull RB10 was changed to "Red Bull".
2017	Navy Blue	Red, Yellow	Red Bull	Rauch, Citrix, TAG Heuer, Pirelli, Hisense, Puma, Siemens, AT&T, Aston Martin, Mobil 1, Esso, Speed Week, Servus TV, Red Bulletin, Red Bull TV, IBM, Simplivity	In the United States and Mexico, both Exxon and Mobil are used, exclusively, as Esso, along with Exxon and Mobil, are ExxonMobil fuel brands. During the 1000th Grand Prix, the first generation of Esso and Mobil logos were used. At the 2019 British Grand Prix, 007 livery was used to promote the 25th James Bond film, along with the license plate B549 WUU to replace the traditional Aston Martin livery.
2018	Navy Blue	Red, Yellow	Red Bull, Aston Martin	TAG Heuer, Rauch, Citrix, Pirelli, Puma, Siemens, AT&T, Mobil 1, Esso, IBM, DITA, Hewlett Packard Enterprise, Simply Cola	In the United States and Mexico, both Exxon and Mobil are used, exclusively, as Esso, along with Exxon and Mobil, are ExxonMobil fuel brands. During the 1000th Grand Prix, the first generation of Esso and Mobil logos were used. At the 2019 British Grand Prix, 007 livery was used to promote the 25th James Bond film, along with the license plate B549 WUU to replace the traditional Aston Martin livery.
2019	Navy Blue	Red, Yellow	Red Bull, Aston Martin	Honda, Rauch, Citrix, Pirelli, Puma, W66.com, Siemens, AT&T, Mobil 1, Esso, IBM, Hewlett Packard Enterprise, TAG Heuer, Futurocoin, Simply Cola	In the United States and Mexico, both Exxon and Mobil are used, exclusively, as Esso, along with Exxon and Mobil, are ExxonMobil fuel brands. During the 1000th Grand Prix, the first generation of Esso and Mobil logos were used. At the 2019 British Grand Prix, 007 livery was used to promote the 25th James Bond film, along with the license plate B549 WUU to replace the traditional Aston Martin livery.
2020	Navy Blue	Red, Yellow	Red Bull, Aston Martin	Honda, Rauch, Citrix, Pirelli, Puma, Siemens, PayVoo, Mobil 1, Esso, IBM, Hewlett Packard Enterprise, TAG Heuer, MyWorld, AT&T, Simply Cola	In the United States and Mexico, both Exxon and Mobil are used, exclusively, as Esso, along with Exxon and Mobil, are ExxonMobil fuel brands. During the 1000th Grand Prix, the first generation of Esso and Mobil logos were used. At the 2019 British Grand Prix, 007 livery was used to promote the 25th James Bond film, along with the license plate B549 WUU to replace the traditional Aston Martin livery.
2021	Navy Blue	Red, Yellow	Red Bull, Honda	Rauch, Claro, Citrix, Pirelli, Puma, Siemens, Mobil 1, Esso, Telcel, Infinitum, INTERproteccion, Hewlett Packard Enterprise, TAG Heuer, Walmart, Oracle, Cash App, AT&T, Tezos, ArmorAll, Simply Cola	During the Turkish Grand Prix weekend, Red Bull sported a special red and white livery and overalls with a message saying "Arigato" on the back of the rear wing. The livery was a tribute to Honda in what would have been their last Japanese Grand Prix, however it was cancelled due to the COVID-19 pandemic in Japan. During the United States Grand Prix, all Honda branding and sponsorship was replaced with Acura, Honda's luxury and performance car manufacturer.
2022–2025	Navy Blue	Red, Yellow	Red Bull, Oracle	Rauch, Claro (2022–2024), Citrix (2022–2023), Pirelli, Puma (2022), Wings For Life (2023), Siemens, Mobil 1, Esso, Infinitum (2022–2024), INTERproteccion (2022–2024), Hewlett Packard Enterprise (2022–2023), TAG Heuer, Servus TV, Tezos (2022), HRC/Honda, Cash App (2022–2023), PokerStars (2022–2023), Arctic Wolf (2022–2024), Walmart (2022–2024), ArmorAll (2022–2025), Bybit (2022–2024), Hard Rock Cafe, Zoom (2022–2024), Simply Cola (2022–2024), Heineken (2023–2025), Rokt (2023–2025), Castore (2023–2025), CDW, Visa (2024–2025), Sui (2024), Pepe Jeans (2024-2025), 1Password (2025), AT&T (2025), Neat (2025), Maui Jim (2025), Ava Trade (2025), GATE.io (2025), Hexagon (2025), Carlyle (2025)	In 2023, the team raced special liveries at all three United States Grands Prix: Miami, Austin and Las Vegas. In 2024, the team intended to enter three different special liveries that would be used for the British, Singapore and United States Grands Prix, but only raced one in Britain; the program was cancelled for the latter two Grands Prix due to weight problems. All of these designs were fan-designed. At the Chinese Grand Prix, the Mobil 1 decals were supplemented with a 50th anniversary decal. Additionally, Bybit/Gate is removed and replaced with "Red Bull" due to the country's ban on cryptocurrency advertising. A variation of the white Red Bull design first used at the 2021 Turkish Grand Prix was used for the 2025 Japanese Grand Prix, to commemorate their partnership with Honda in what would be their last Japanese Grand Prix together before they moved to Aston Martin.
2026	Dark Blue	Red, Yellow, Black	Red Bull, Oracle	Pirelli, Ford Racing, Siemens, Mobil 1, Esso, TAG Heuer, Hard Rock Cafe, Rokt, Visa, Pepe Jeans, 1Password, AT&T, Neat, Ava Trade, GATE.io, Hexagon, Carlyle, Heineken, Maui Jim, ArmorAll, Clear, DAMAC, Indeed	Gate was replaced with Red Bull for the Chinese Grand Prix.

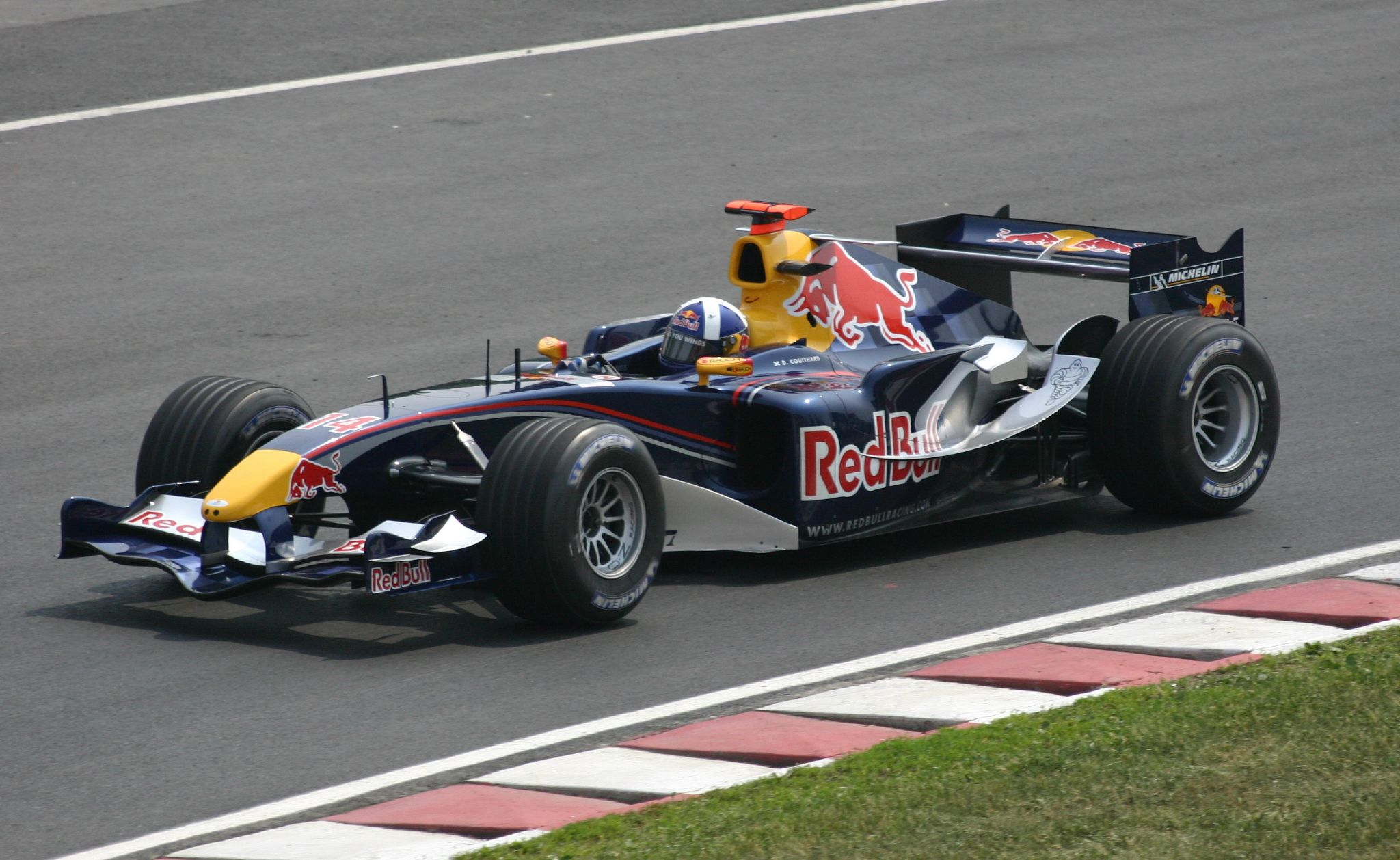
David Coulthard driving the Red Bull RB1 at the 2005 Canadian Grand Prix

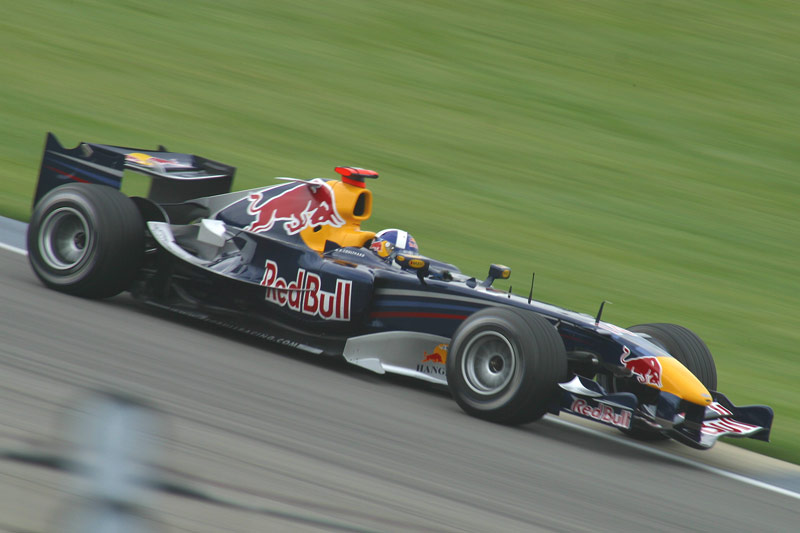
David Coulthard driving the Red Bull RB2 at the 2006 United States Grand Prix

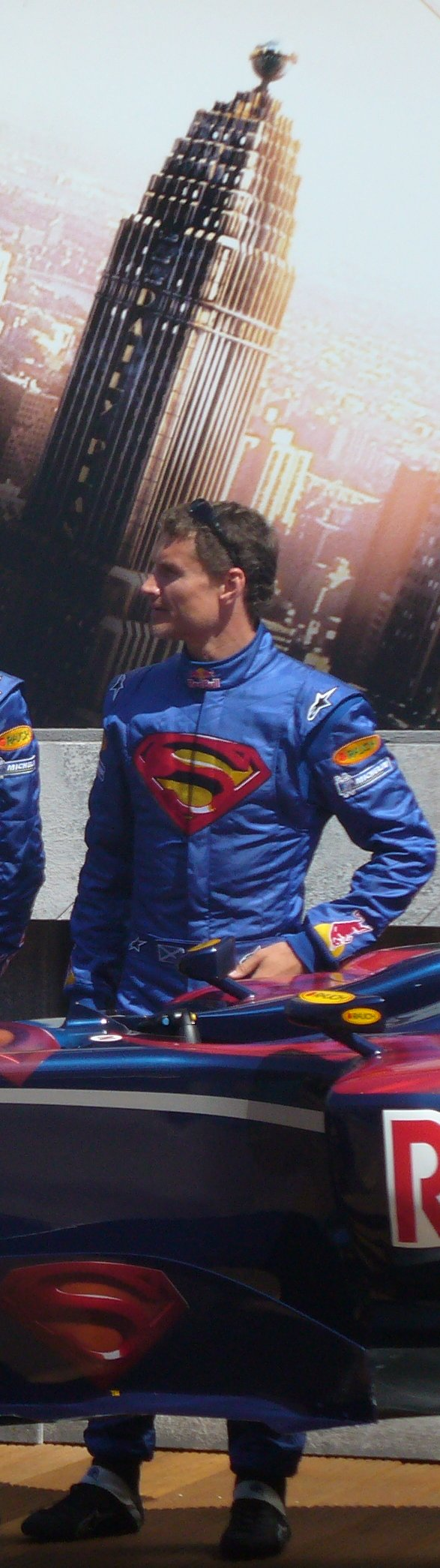
David Coulthard promoting the launch of Superman Returns at the 2006 Monaco Grand Prix

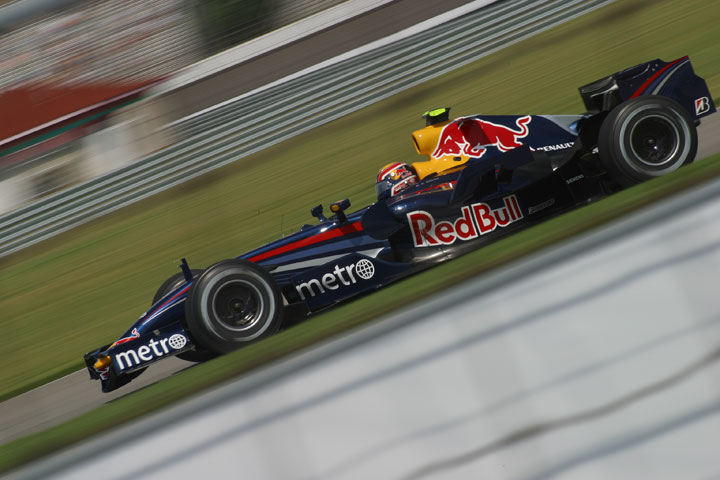
Mark Webber driving the Red Bull RB3 at the 2007 United States Grand Prix

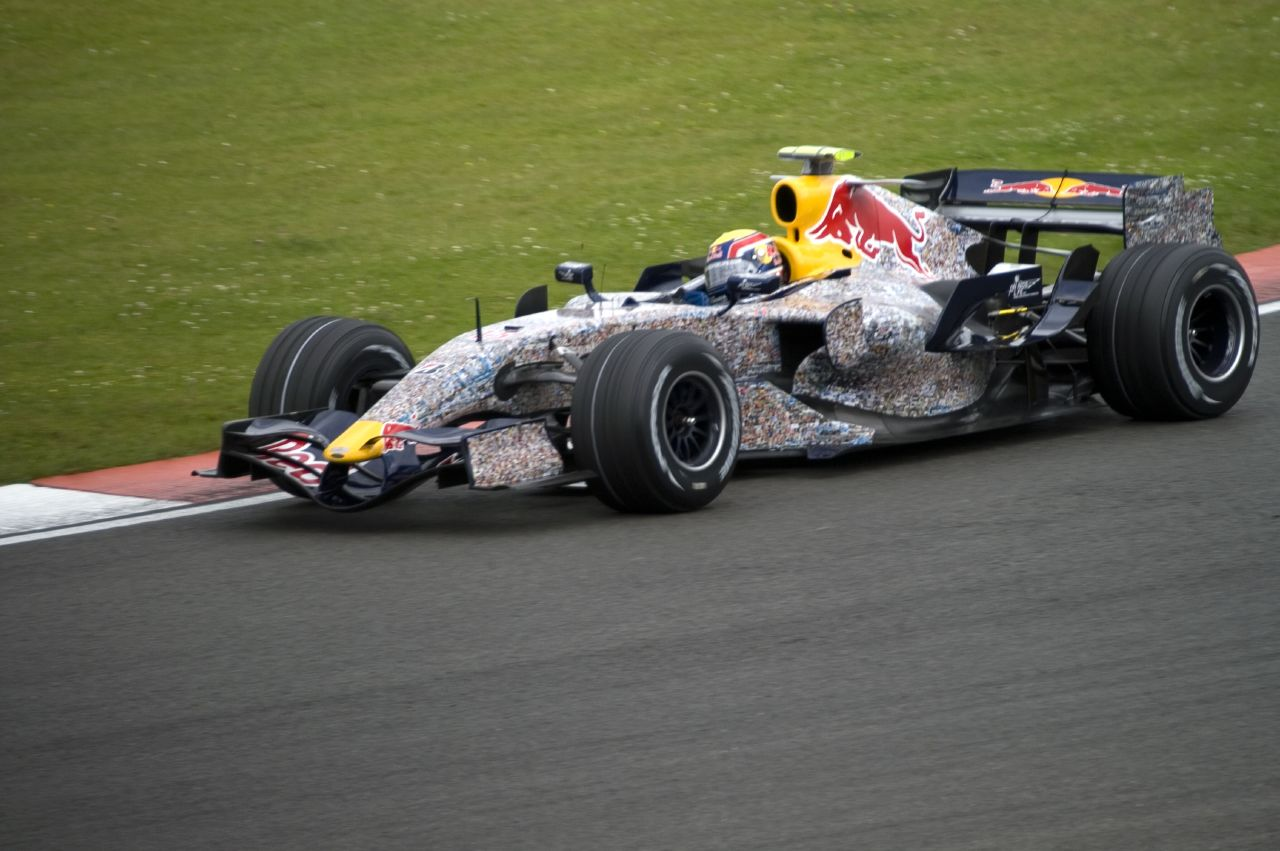
The special Wings for Life livery at the 2007 British Grand Prix

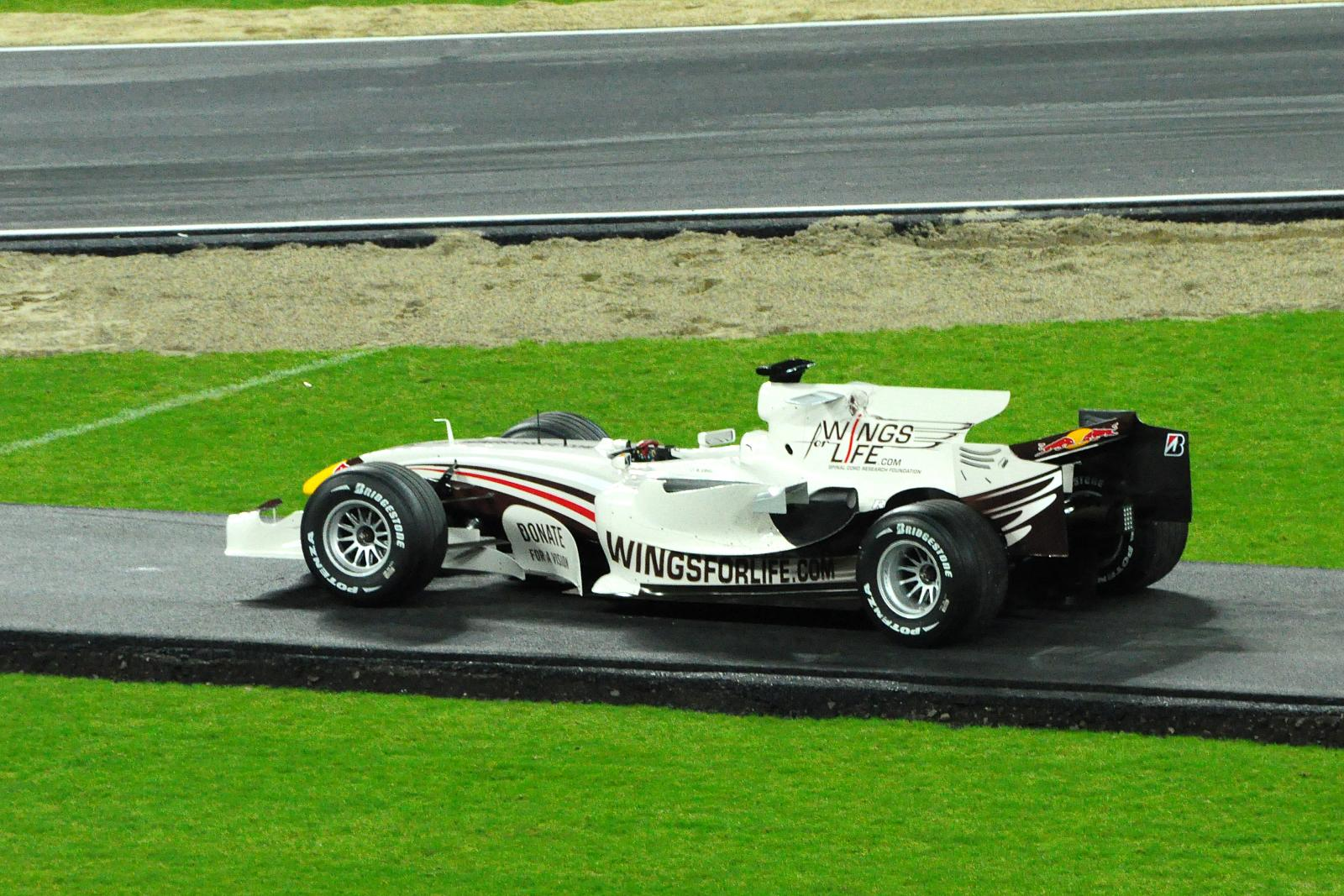
David Coulthard's Red Bull RB4 from the 2008 Brazilian Grand Prix, Coulthard's final race in Formula One

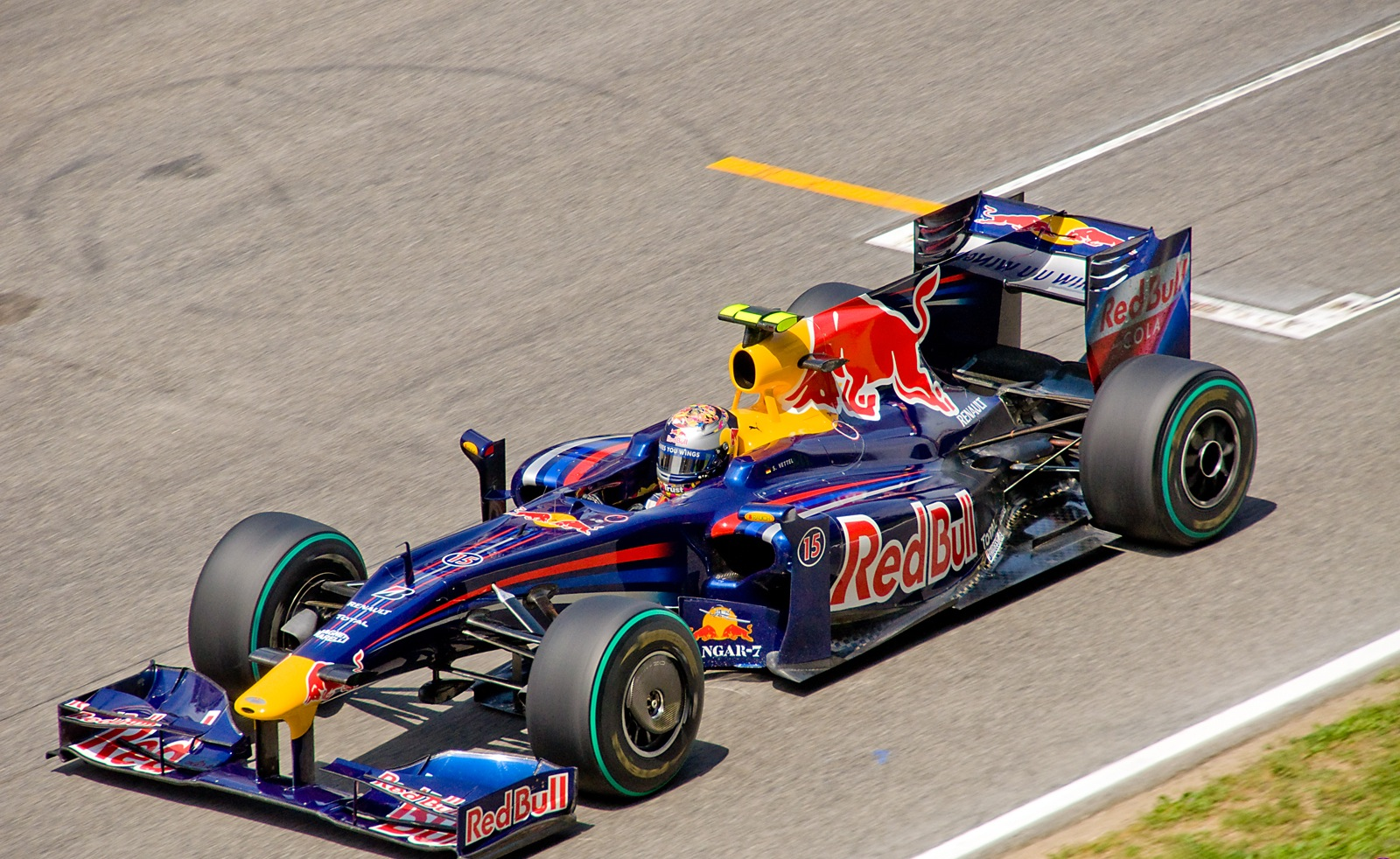
Sebastian Vettel driving the Red Bull RB5 at the 2009 Spanish Grand Prix

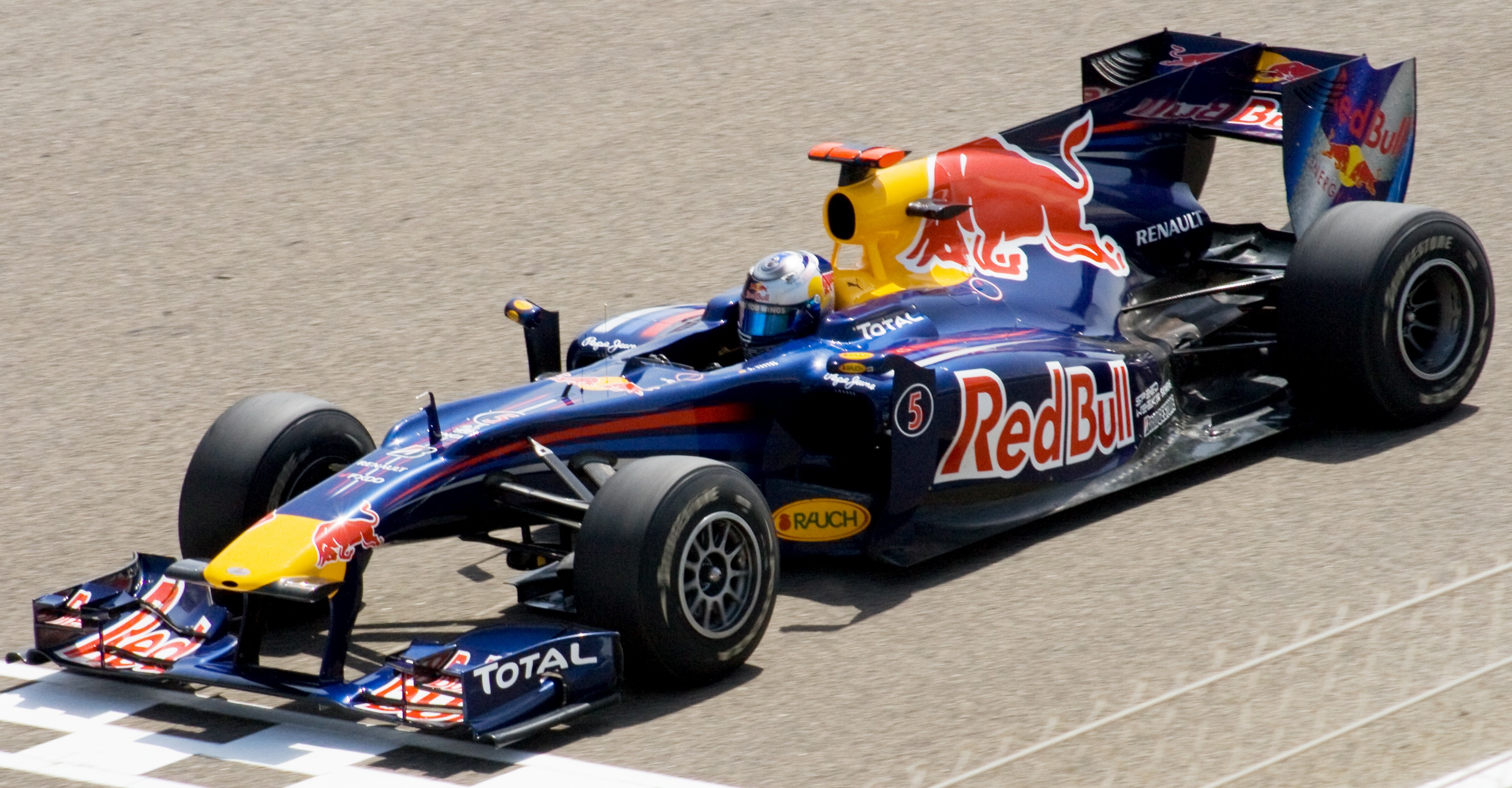
Sebastian Vettel driving the Red Bull RB6 at the 2010 Bahrain Grand Prix

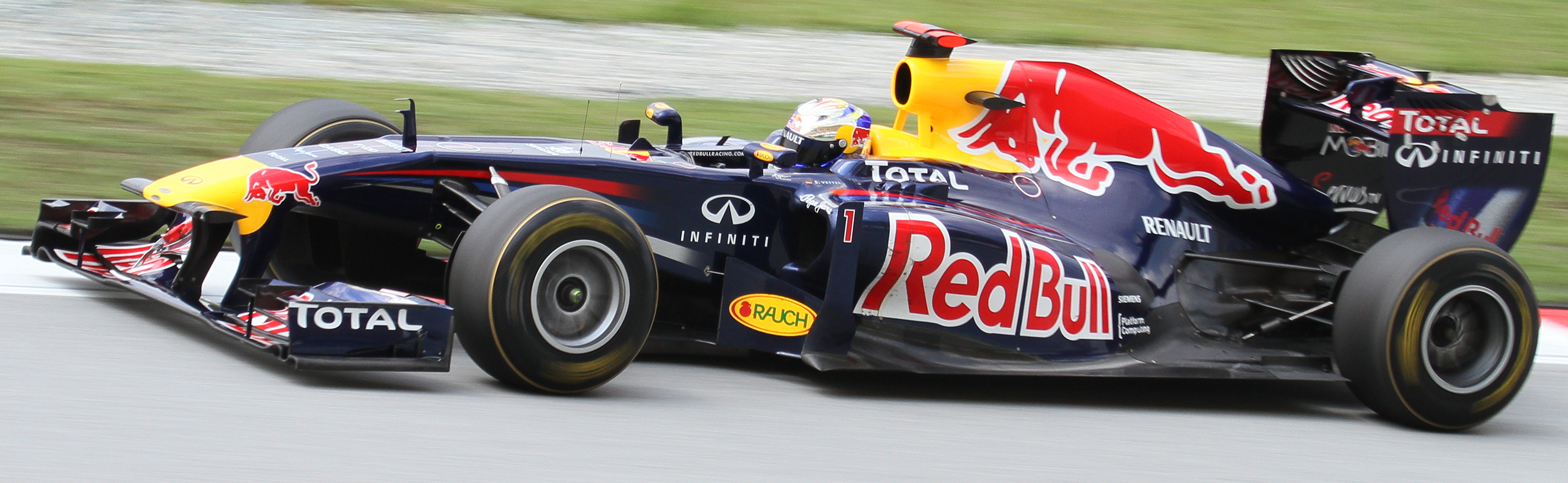
Sebastian Vettel driving the Red Bull RB7 at the 2011 Malaysian Grand Prix

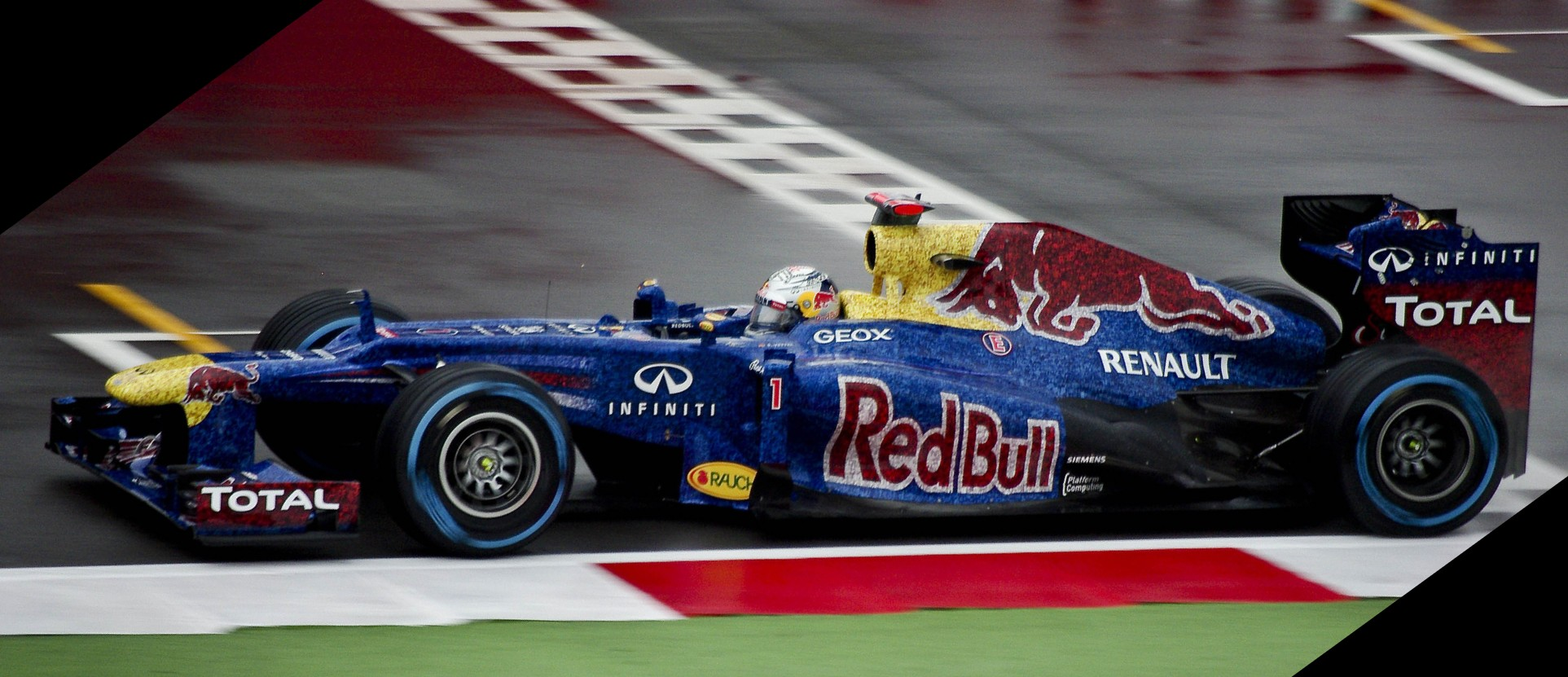
The Red Bull RB8 ran a special livery at the 2012 British Grand Prix featuring photographs of fans to raise money for the Wings for Life foundation.

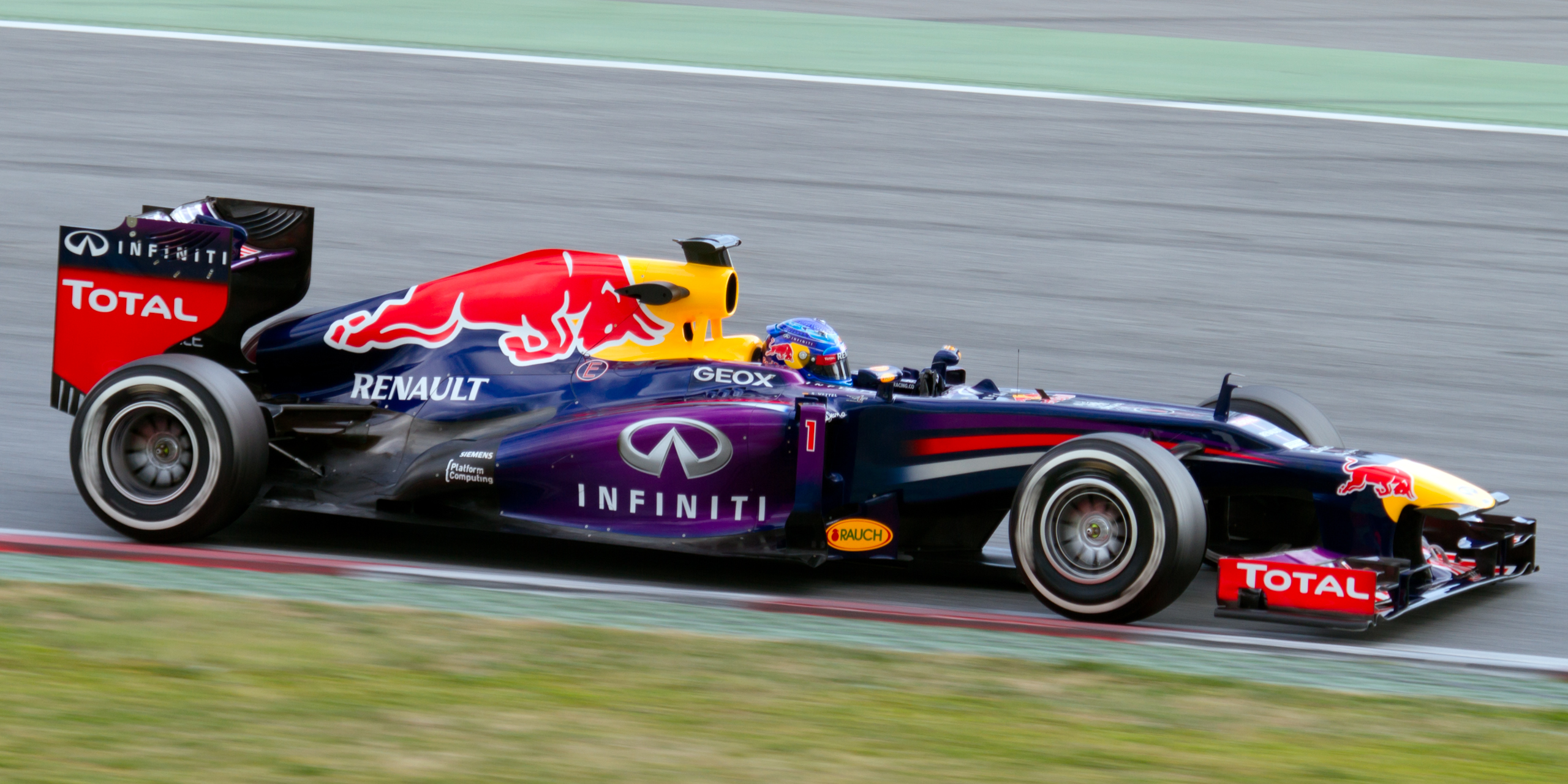
Purple strips and gradients on the Red Bull RB9 paid more attention to the Infiniti sponsorship

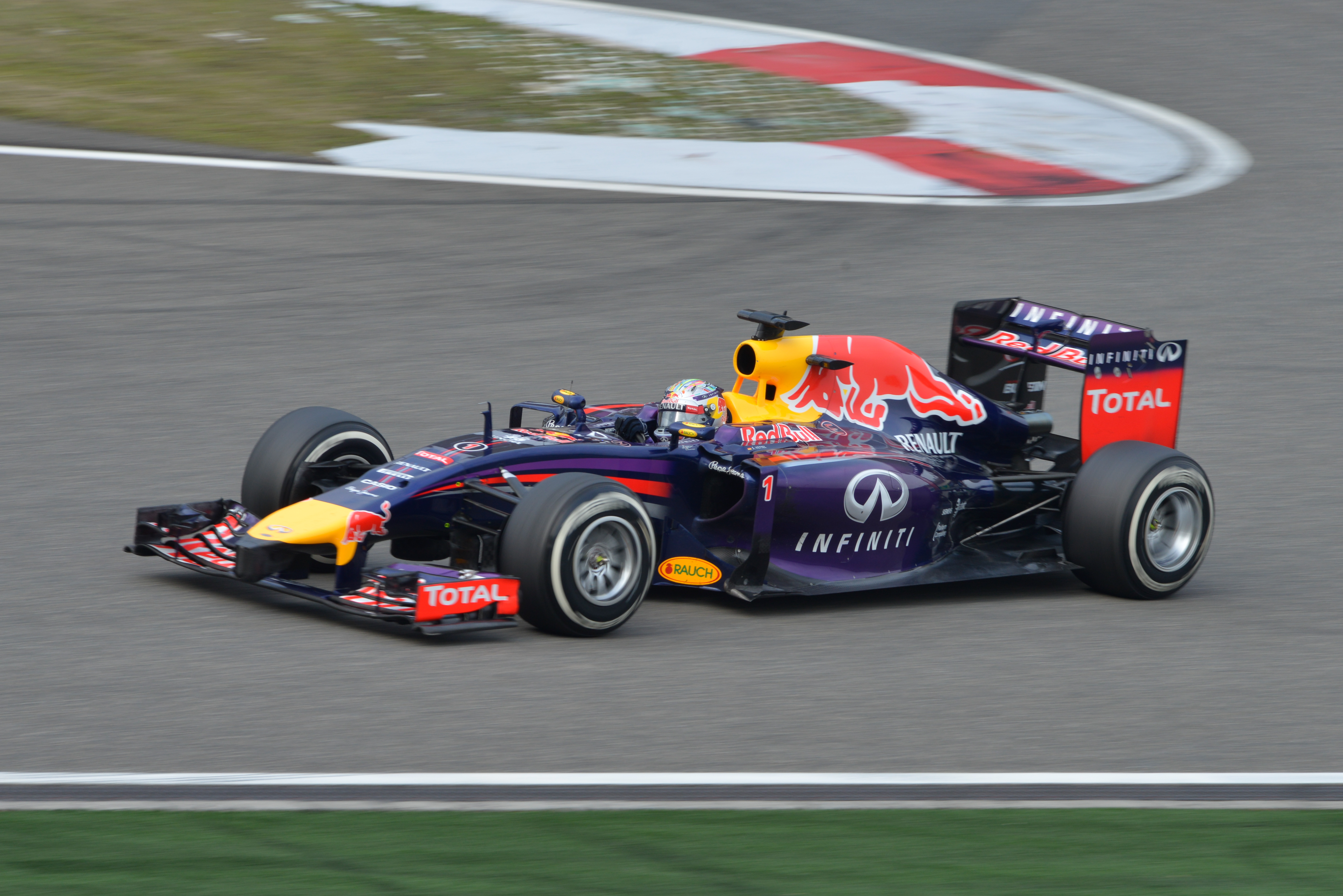
Sebastian Vettel driving the RB10 at the 2014 Chinese Grand Prix

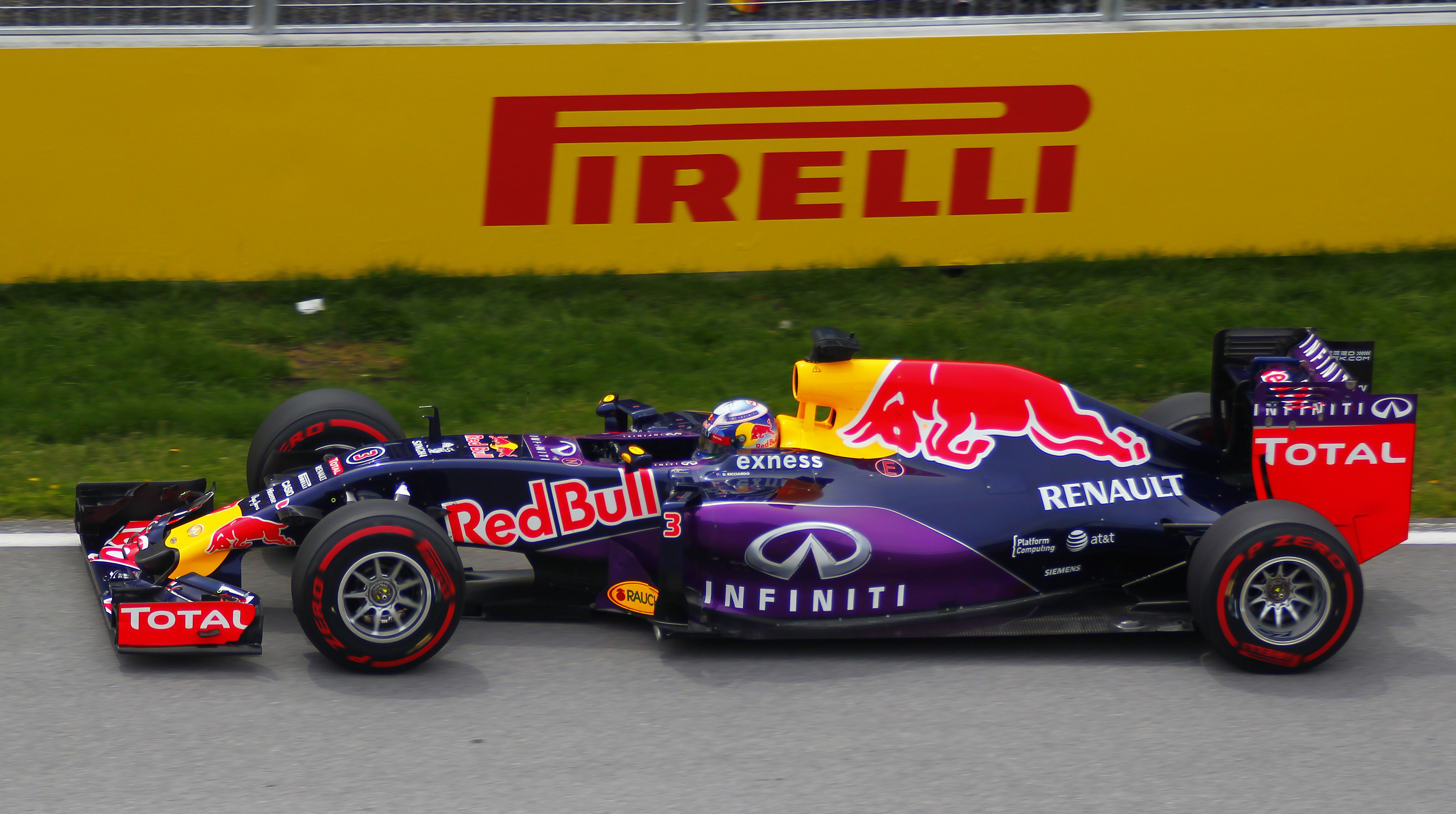
Daniel Ricciardo driving the RB11 at the 2015 Canadian Grand Prix

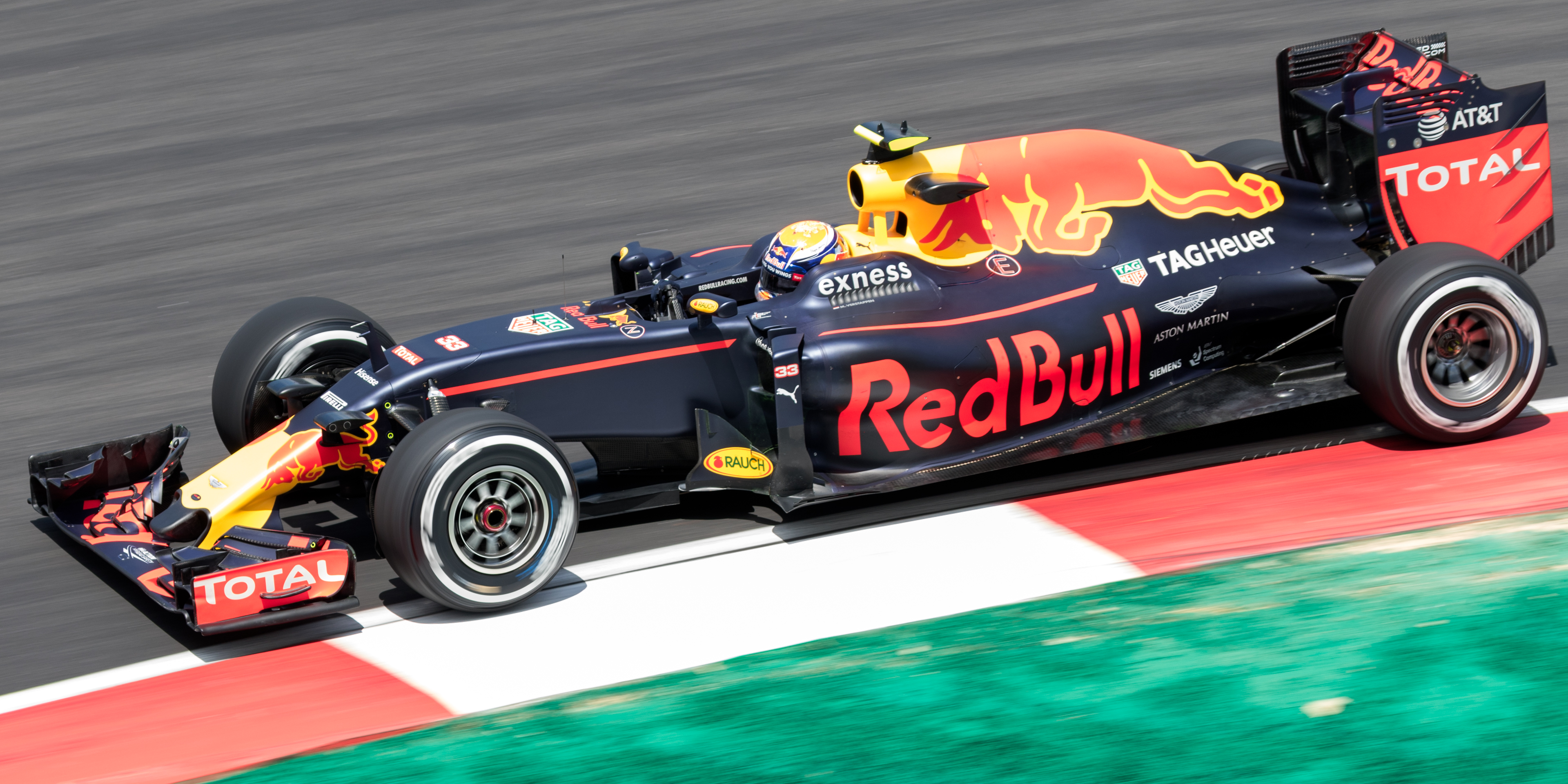
Max Verstappen driving the RB12 at the 2016 Malaysian Grand Prix

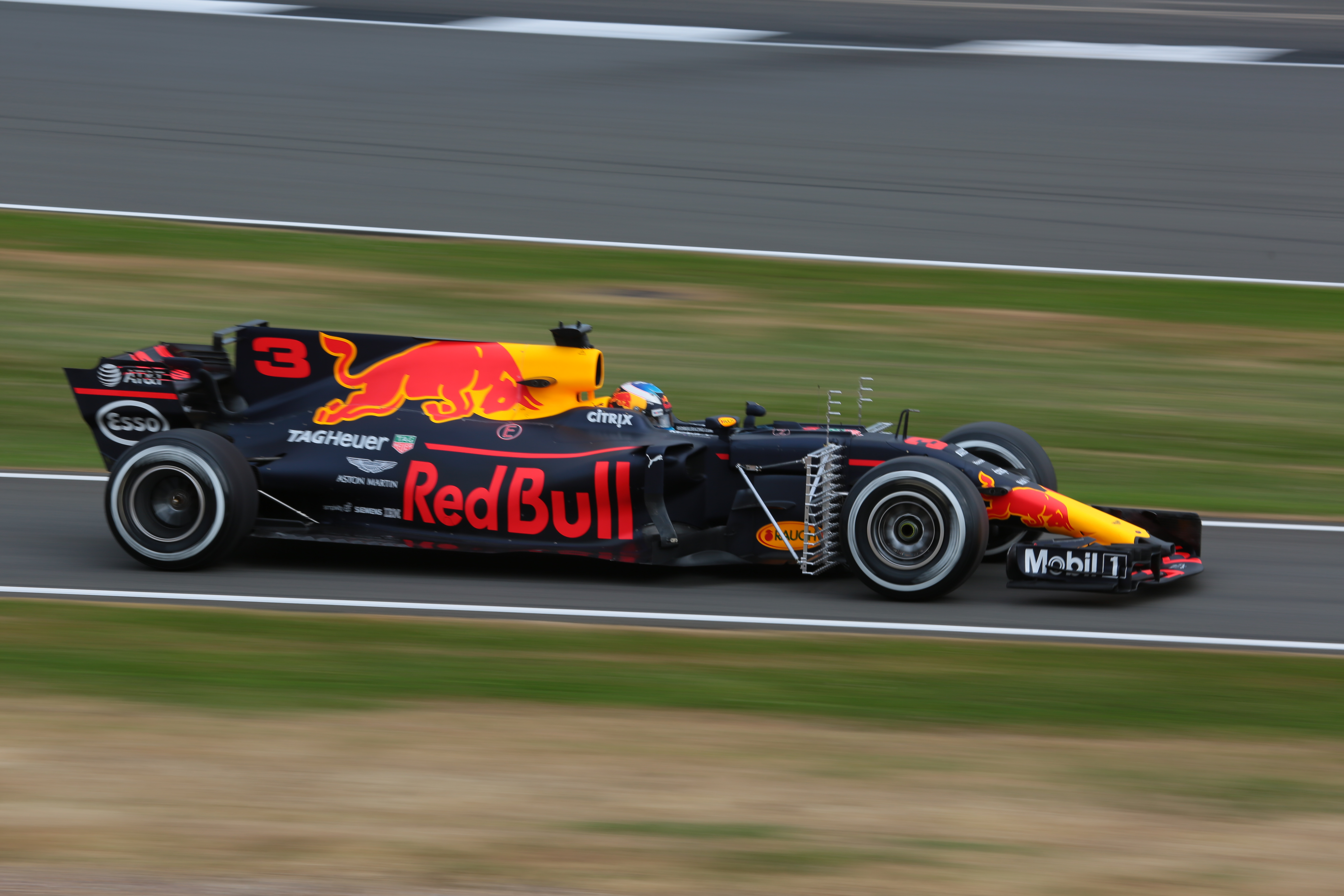
Daniel Ricciardo driving the RB13 with aerodynamic sensors during practice for the 2017 British Grand Prix

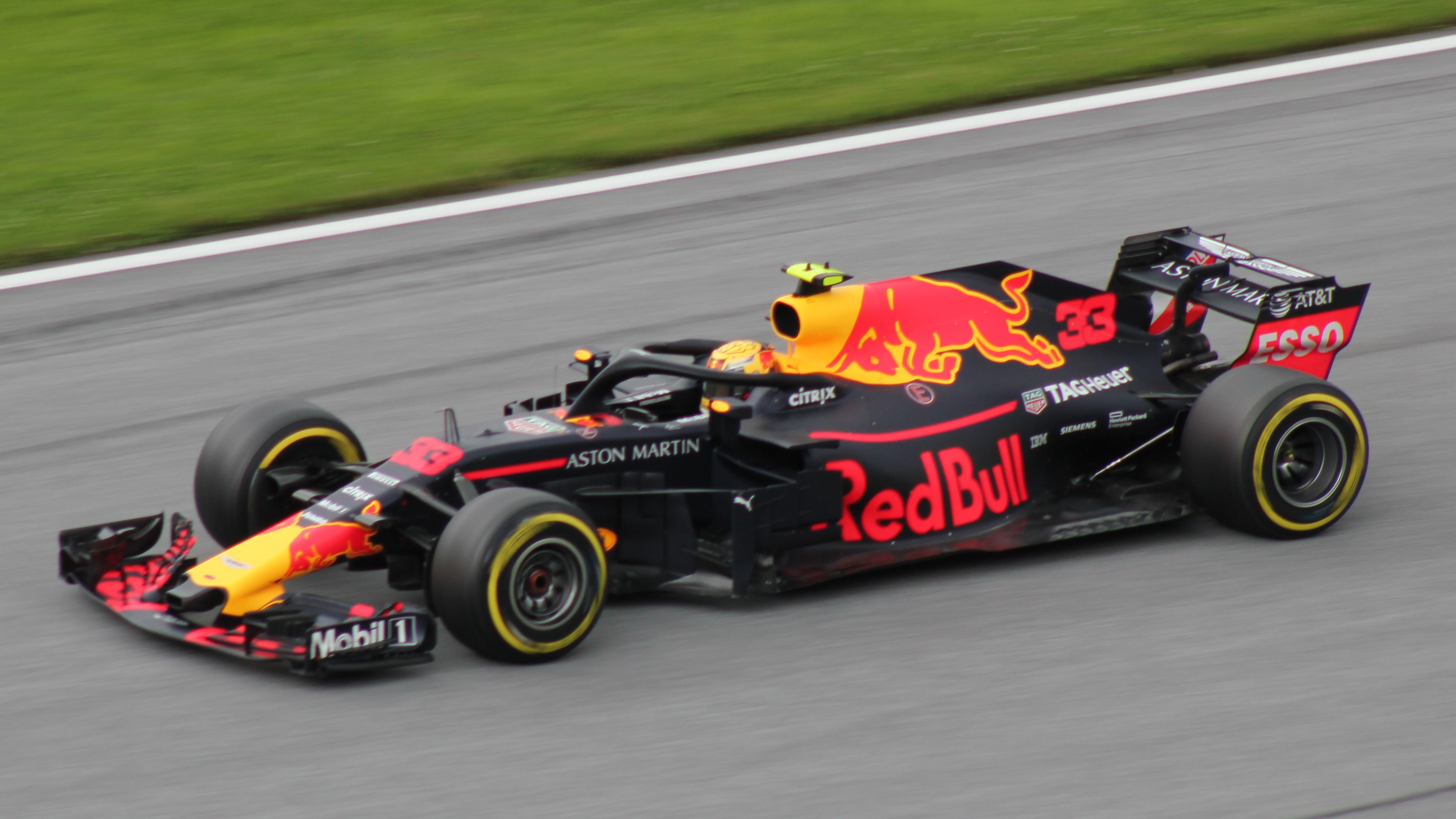
Max Verstappen driving the RB14 at the 2018 Austrian Grand Prix

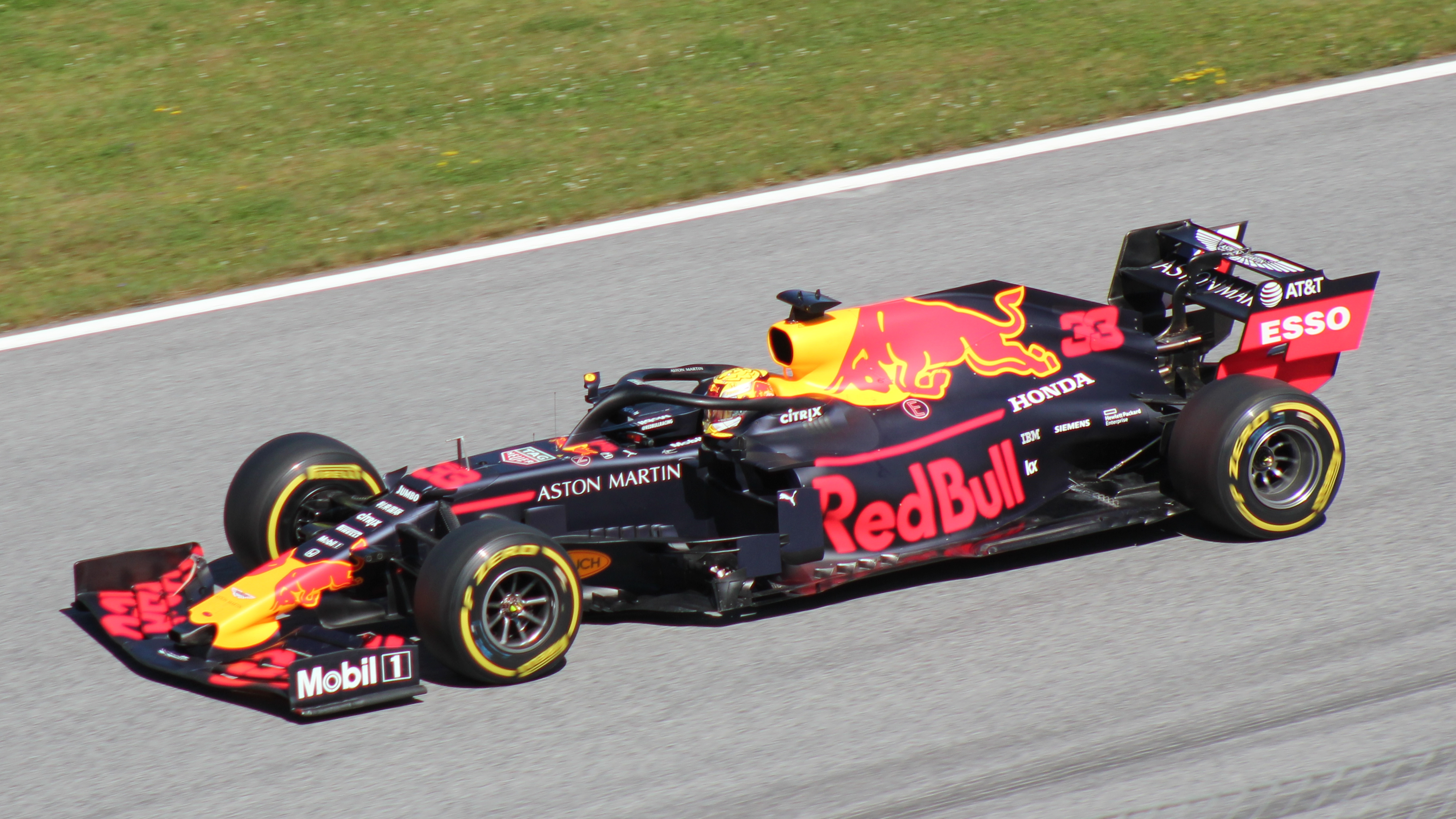
Max Verstappen driving the RB15 at the 2019 Austrian Grand Prix

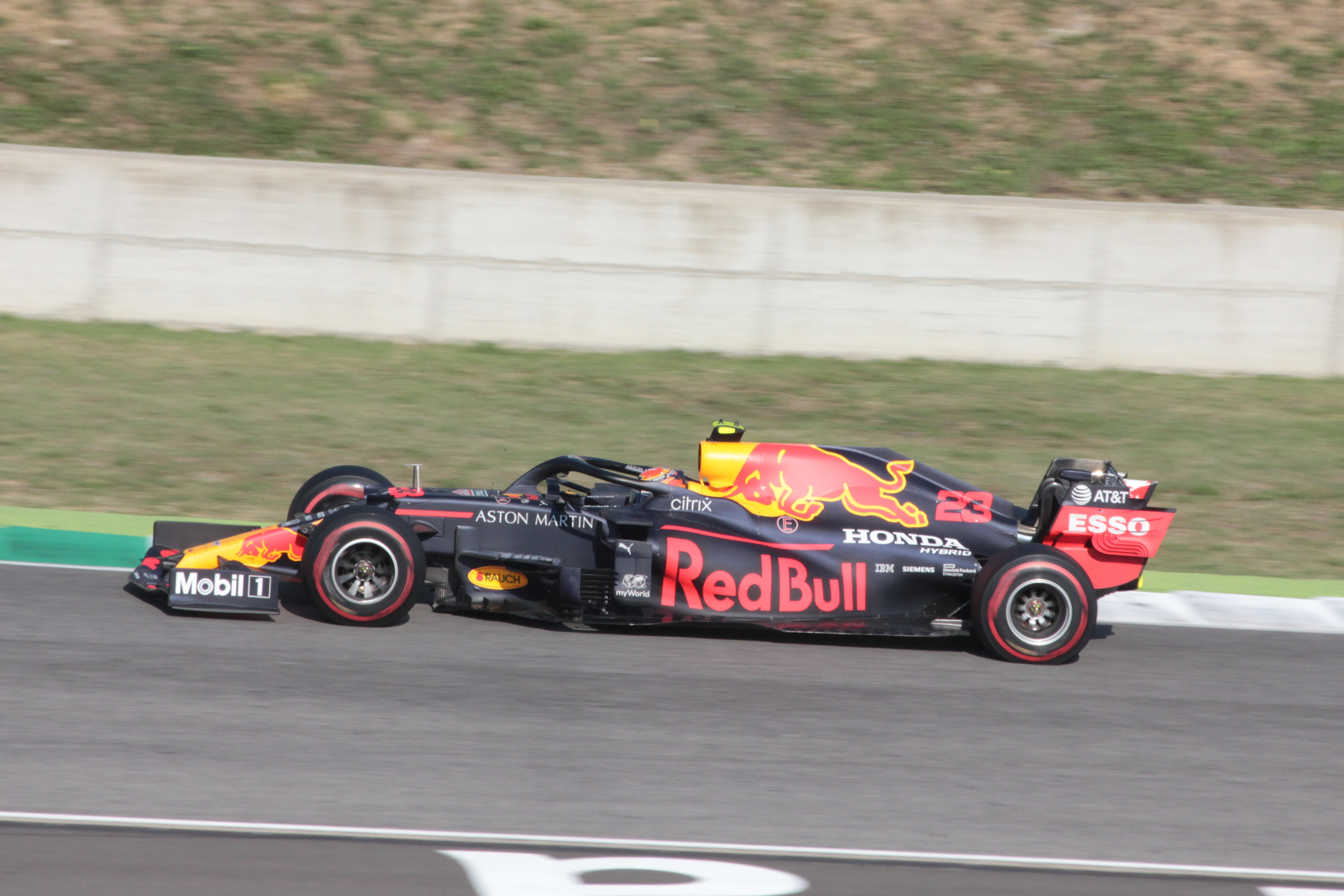
Alex Albon driving the RB16 at the 2020 Tuscan Grand Prix

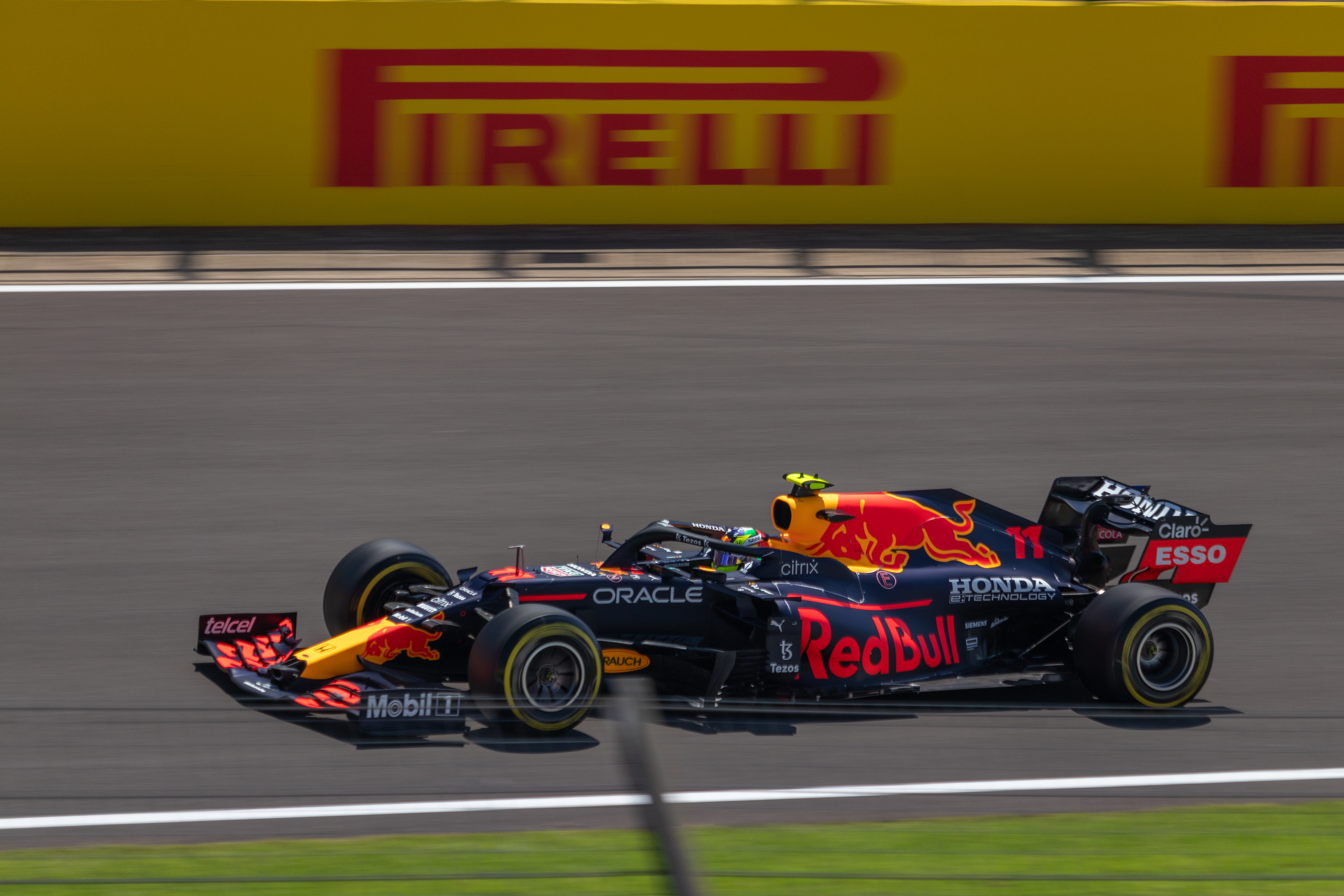
Sergio Pérez driving the RB16B at the 2021 British Grand Prix

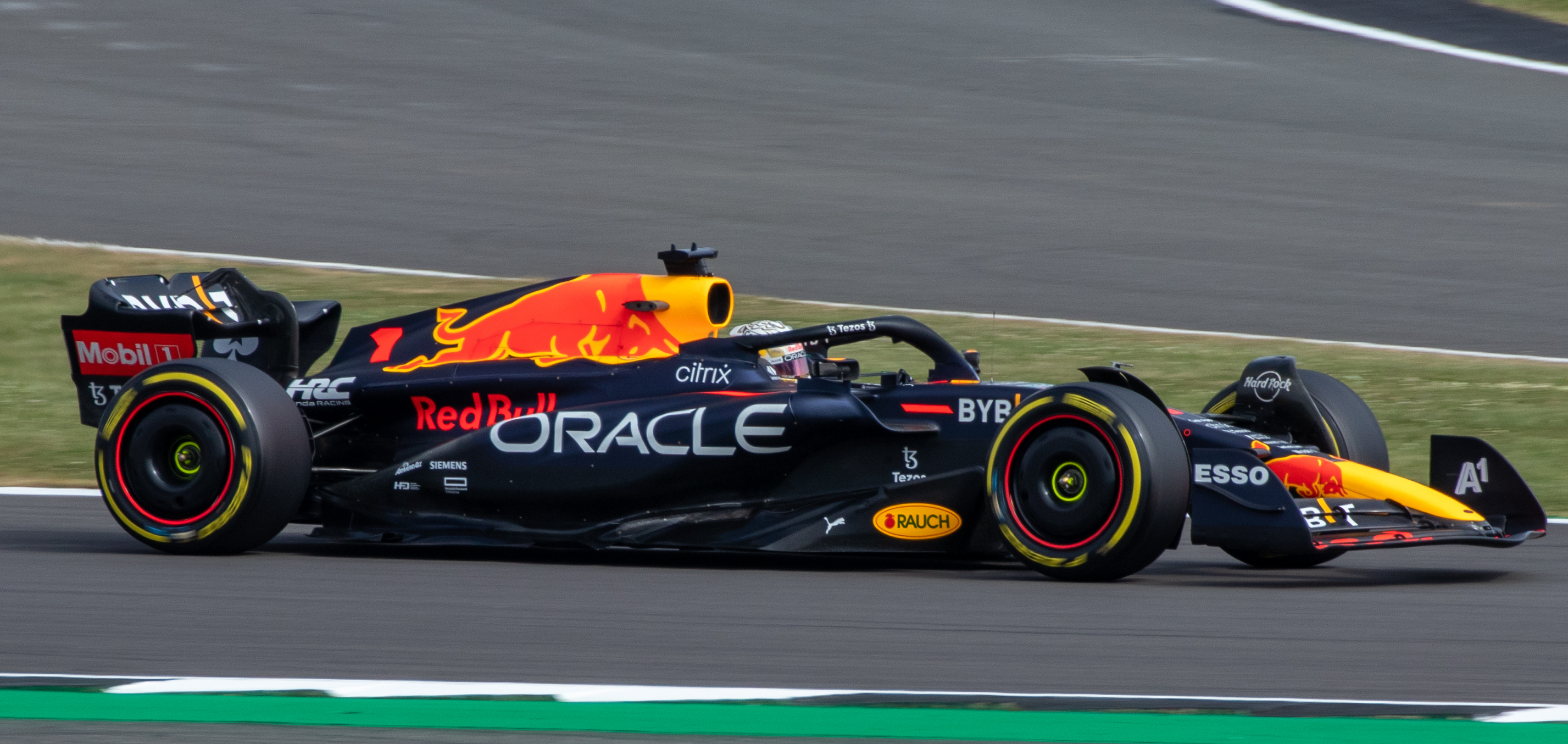
Max Verstappen driving the RB18 at the 2022 British Grand Prix

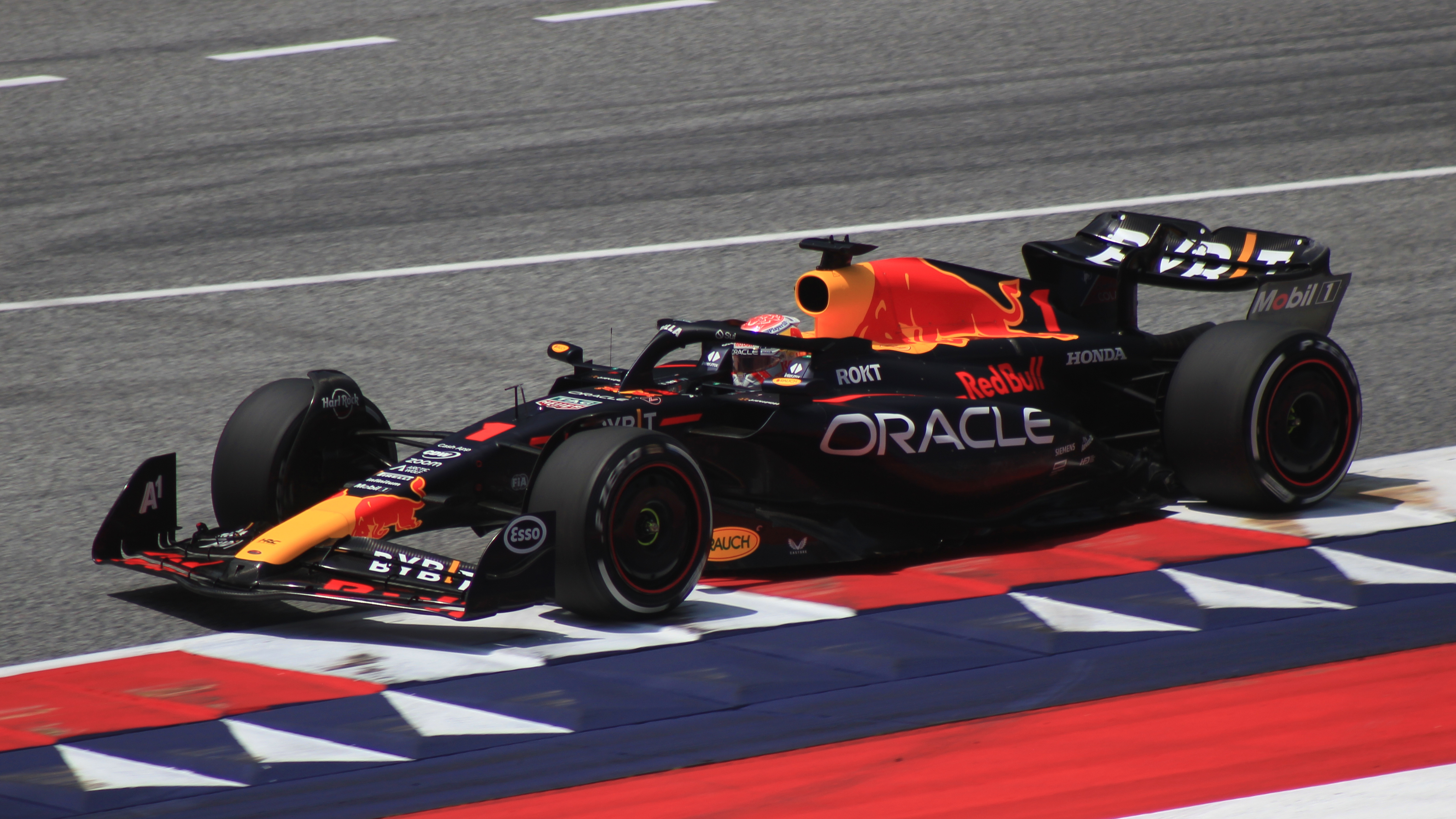
Max Verstappen driving the RB19 at the 2023 Austrian Grand Prix

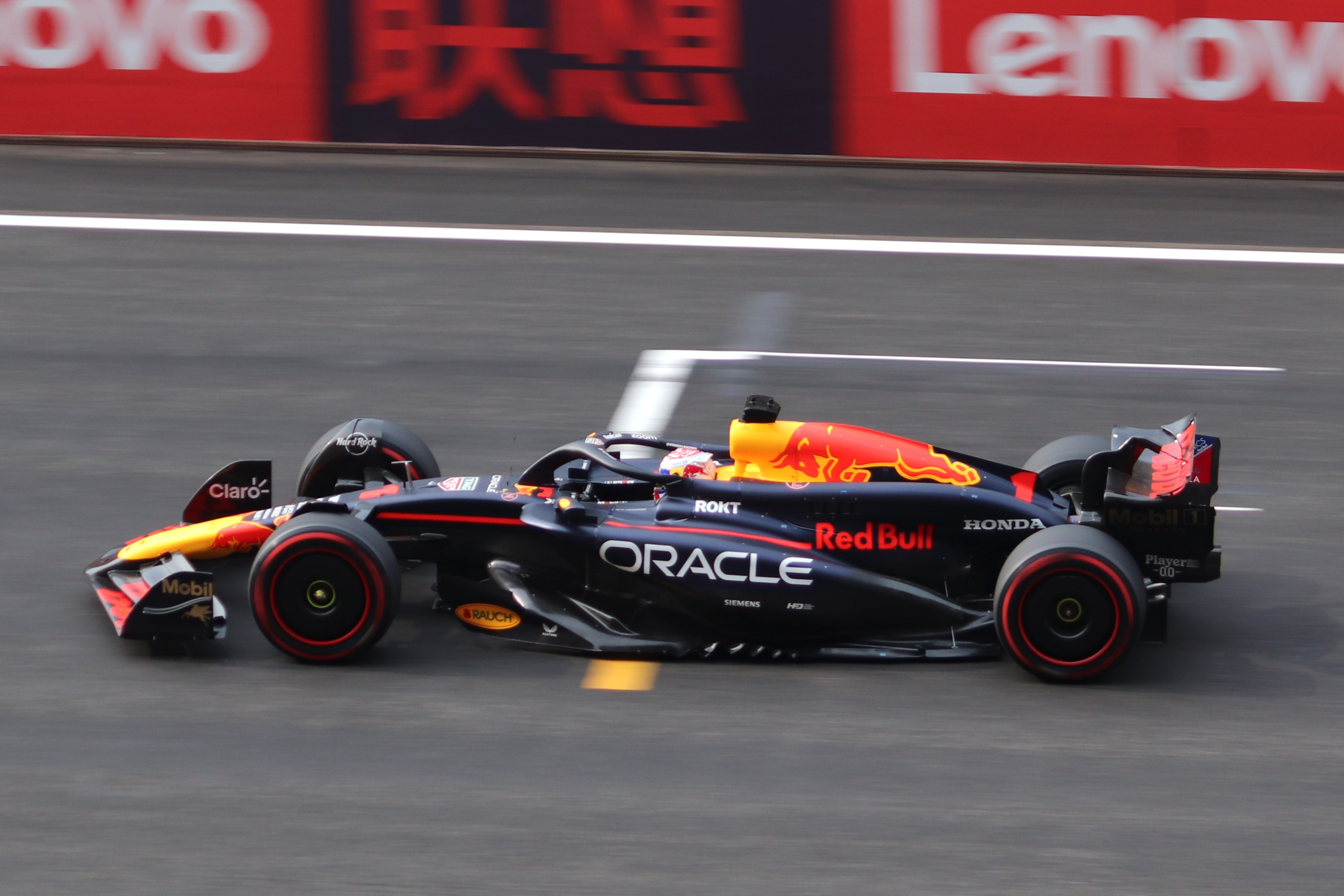
Max Verstappen driving the RB20 at the 2024 Chinese Grand Prix

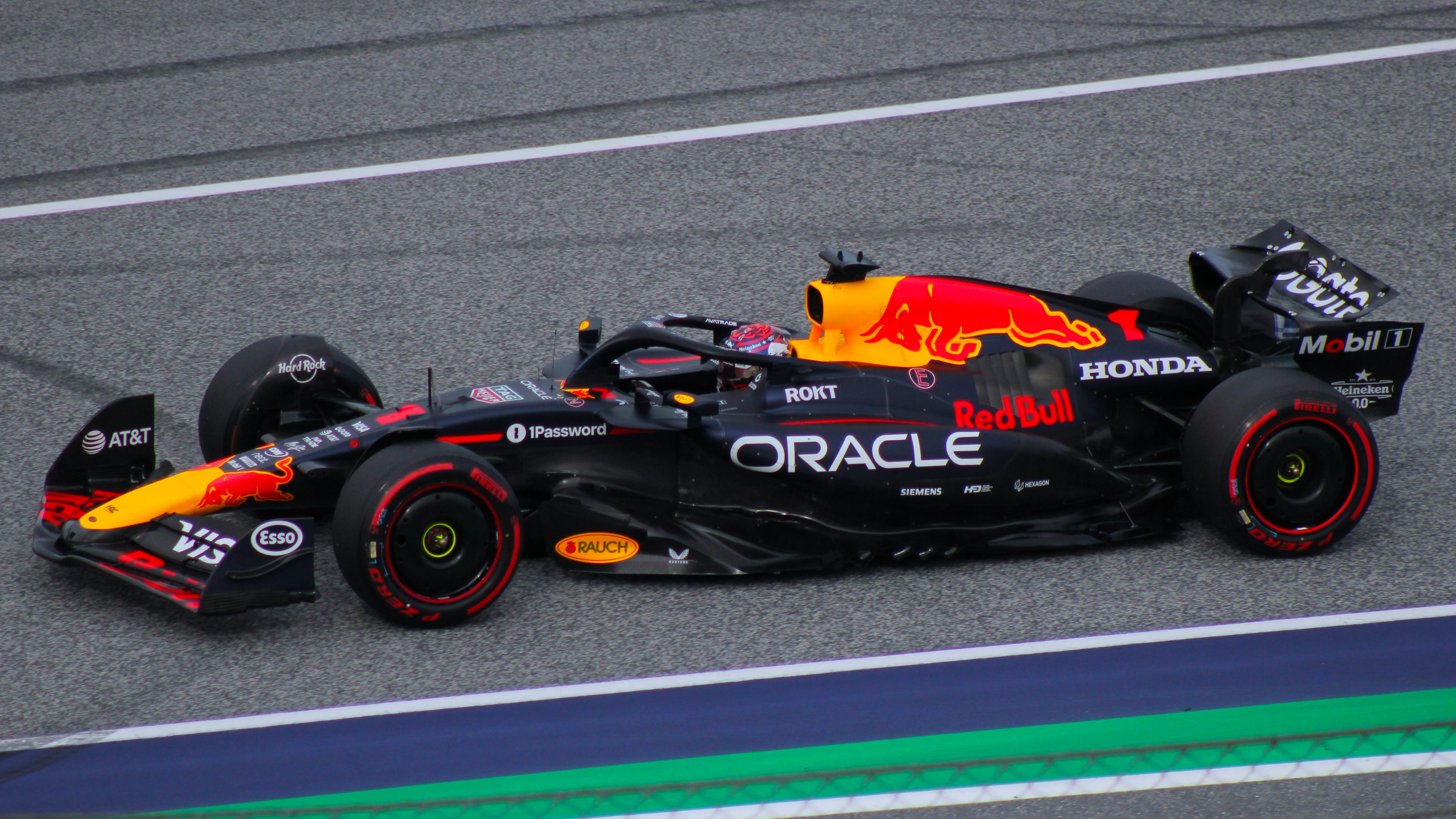
Max Verstapppen driving the RB21 at the 2025 Austrian Grand Prix

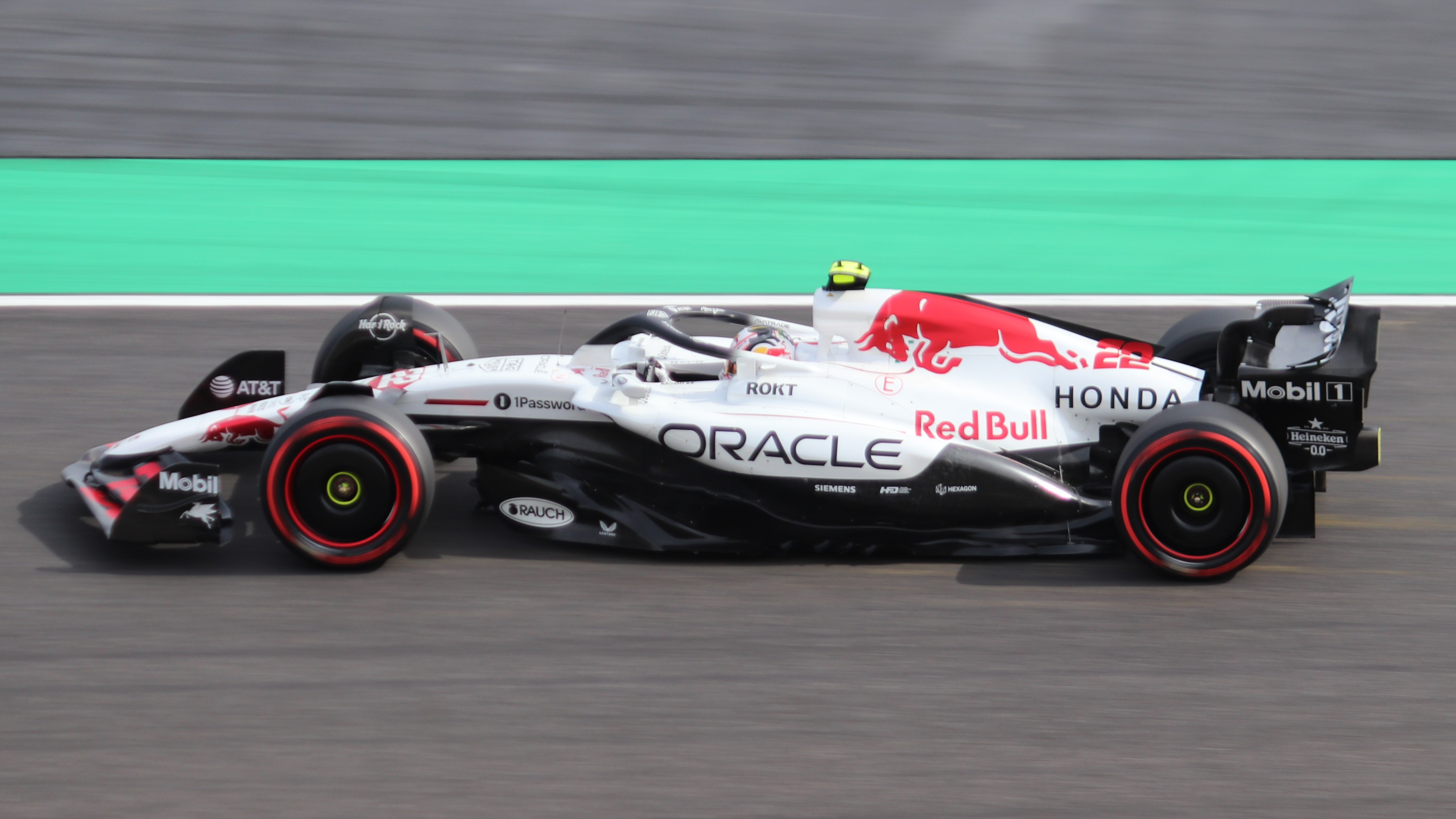
Yuki Tsunoda driving a special Honda livery RB21 at the 2025 Japanese Grand Prix

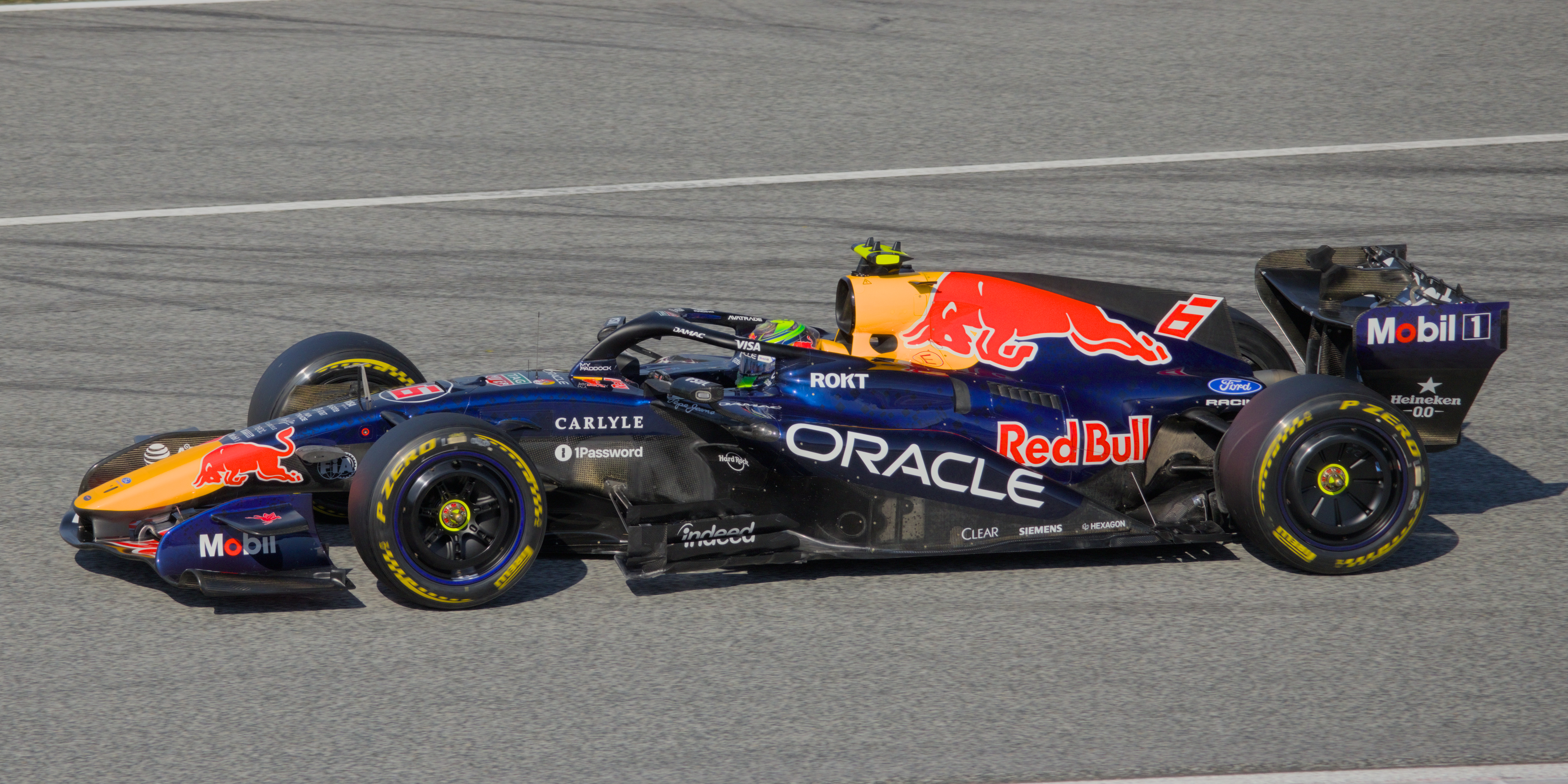
Isack Hadjar driving the RB22 at the 2026 Austrian Grand Prix

== Renault ==
Renault competed as a constructor in Formula One in three different periods, from the 1977-1985, 2002-2011 and 2016-2020 seasons. Renault returned to Formula One in 2002 by buying the Benetton team. Though competing with a French licence, between the 2002 and 2006 seasons Renault F1 cars wore a blue colour not as the Bleu de France, the national racing colour of France but due to the Enstone team's title sponsor the Japanese cigarette brand Mild Seven. Subsequently the team switched to ING Group from the 2007 season to the 2009 Italian Grand Prix when ING withdrew all association with Renault. The team was sold and competed as Lotus from the 2012-2015 seasons, before Renault bought back the team and returned as a constructor in 2016. The Renault Group subsequently rebranded the team as Alpine team in 2021.

Year	Main colour(s)	Additional colour(s)	Livery sponsor(s)	Additional major sponsor(s)	Non-tobacco/alcohol and other livery changes
1977–1985	Yellow	Black, White	Elf Aquitaine, Renault	Longines, Europcar, Champion, Michelin (1977–1984), Ferodo, Tissot, Goodyear (1985), Magneti Marelli, Koni, Facom, RoT Electronics, Speedline, De Carbon, Sodicam, Valeo	
2002–2006	Blue	Yellow	Mild Seven	Chronotech, Elf Aquitaine, Telefónica (2004–2006), Hanjin Shipping (2002–2006), i-mode (2004–2006), Magneti Marelli, Altran, Dassault Systèmes (2002), Elysium, Steria, Symantec, Puma (2004–2006), Guru (2004–2006), Mutua Madrileña (2006)	"Mild Seven" was replaced with "Blue World" or "RenaultSport" (2002), Mild Seven logo was replaced with "Blue World" or replaced with sky blue space (2003), Mild Seven was replaced with drivers full name, Mild Seven logo was replaced by the car's number "Mild Seven" was replaced with "Team Spirit" (on team members clothing) (2004), Mild Seven changed to "Team Spirit" or concept art (2005 to 2006)
2007	Yellow	White, Orange	ING Group	Hanjin Shipping, Chronotech, Elf Aquitaine, Magneti Marelli, Altran, Elysium, Steria, Symantec	
2008	Yellow	White, Orange	ING Group	Chronotech, Mutua Madrileña, Pepe Jeans, Elf Aquitaine, Magneti Marelli, Altran, Elysium, Steria, Symantec	
2009	Yellow	White, Orange	ING Group (until Italian GP), Renault (from Singapore GP)	Total, Mutua Madrileña (until Italian GP), Pepe Jeans, TW Steel (from Abu Dhabi GP), MegaFon, Altran, Elysium, Steria, Symantec	"ING" changed to "Renault" once ING withdrew support following the Italian GP
2010	Yellow, Black	Red	Renault	Total, TW Steel, Elf, Bridgestone, HP, Mov'It, Lada, DIAC, Bank Snoras, Vyborg Shipyards, Flagman Vodka	
2011	Black	Gold, Red	Renault, Lotus	Total, Genii, Lada, Japan Rags, Trina Solar, Sibur, TW Steel, Suncore Corporation, Embratel, Flagman, Rover Coal, Helvetica, Elf, Magneti Marelli, Symantec, Elysium, NetApp, Pirelli	
2016	Yellow	Black, Grey	Renault	Infiniti, Genii, Jack & Jones, Microsoft Dynamics, Total, Pirelli, EMC Corporation, DigiPen, Office 365, Devialet, Eurodatacar, Elysium Inc, Computacenter, Bell & Ross, Athletic Propulsion Labs	During pre-season testing, the car was coloured in black.
2017	Yellow, Black	Grey	Renault	Infiniti, Genii, Microsoft, BP, Castrol, Pirelli, DigiPen, Devialet, Eurodatacar, Elysium Inc, Computacenter, Bell & Ross, Mapfre, Siemens, Athletic Propulsion Labs, SMP Racing, Ixell	At the 2017 Monaco Grand Prix, the car featured the Star Wars 40th anniversary logo; at the 2017 United States Grand Prix, the car featured pink sidepods and pink stripes on the fin to raise awareness of breast cancer.
2018	Black	Yellow, Grey	Renault	Castrol, Infiniti, RCI Banque, Mapfre, Estrella Galicia, BP, Microsoft, Eurodatacar, Bell & Ross, Tmall, Genii, Alpinestars, Athletic Propulsion Labs, Elysium Inc, Hechter, Ixell, Pirelli, Siemens	At the 2018 British Grand Prix, an Incredibles 2 promotion was held with red and yellow stripes being added to the fin.
2019	Black	Yellow, Grey	Renault	Castrol, Infiniti, RCI Banque, Mapfre, BP, Microsoft, Bell & Ross, Tmall, Genii, Pirelli, Elysium Inc, Hechter	
2020	Black	Yellow, Grey	Renault, DP World	Castrol, Infiniti, RCI Banque, Mapfre, BP, Microsoft, Bell & Ross, DP World, Genii, Pirelli, E-Tech, DuPont, Elysium Inc, Ixell, Yahoo!, Tmall	During pre-season testing, the car was coloured in black.

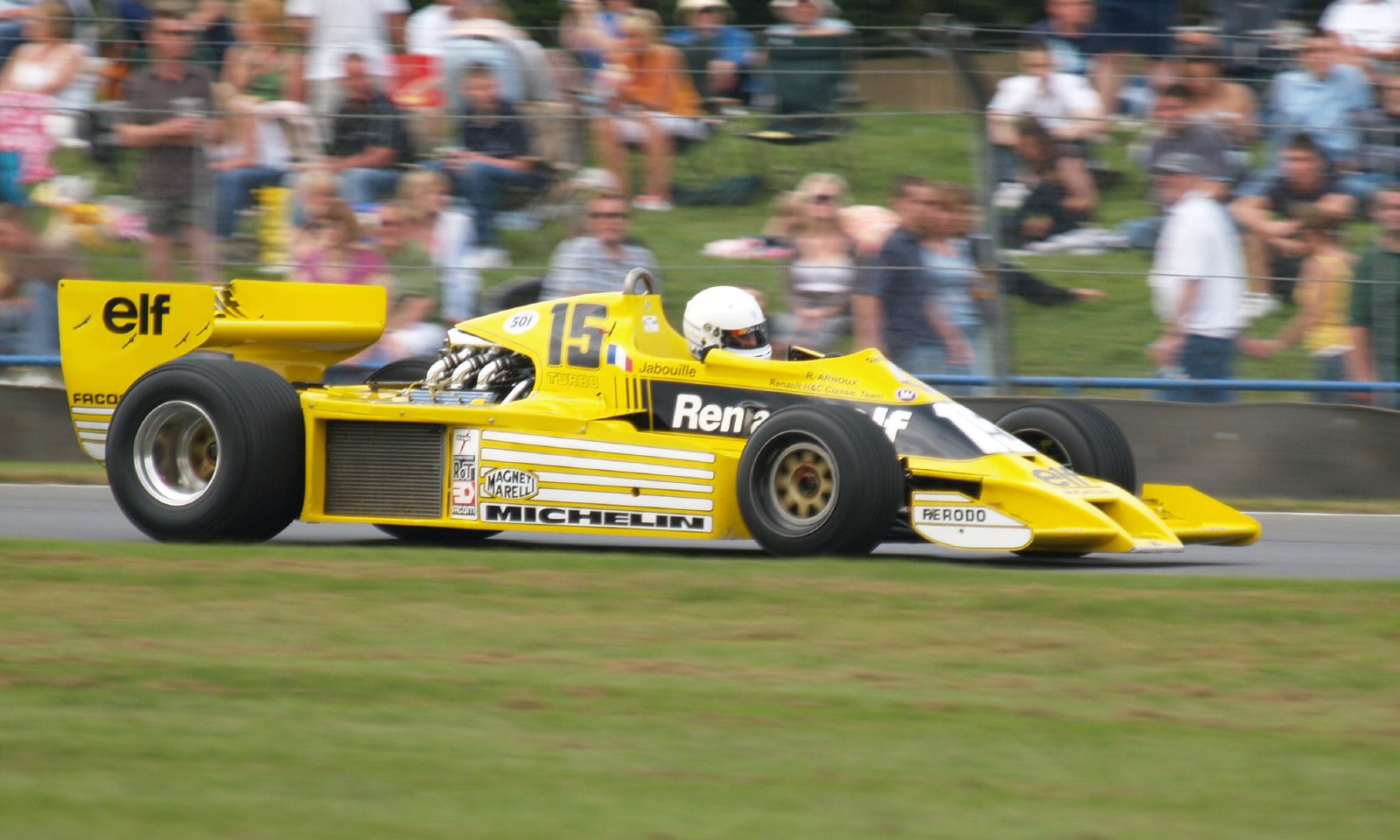
Renault's first F1 car, the RS01, raced with a predominantly yellow colour scheme which was largely unchanged until the team's withdrawal from the sport at the end of 1985.

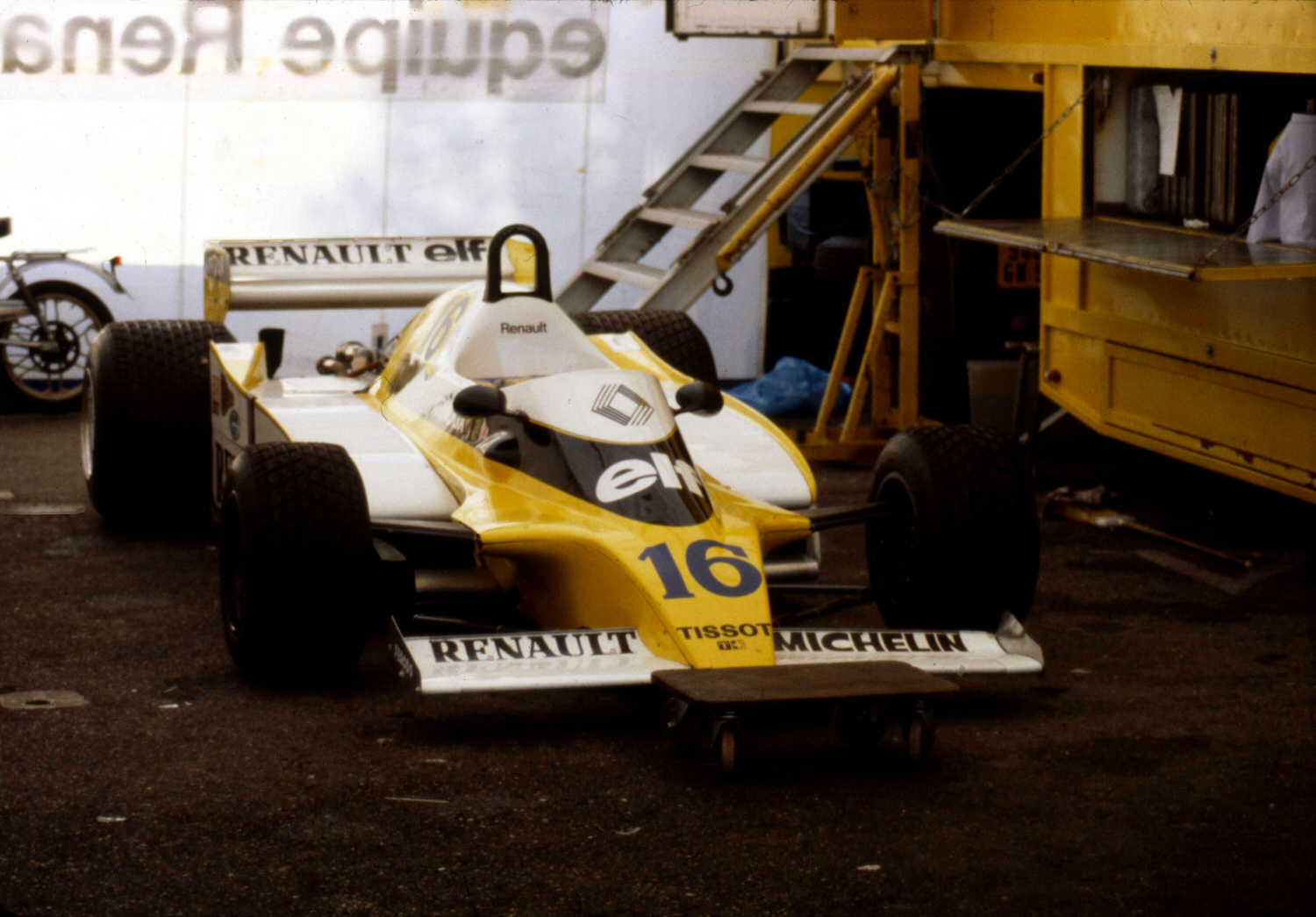
A 1979 Renault RS10

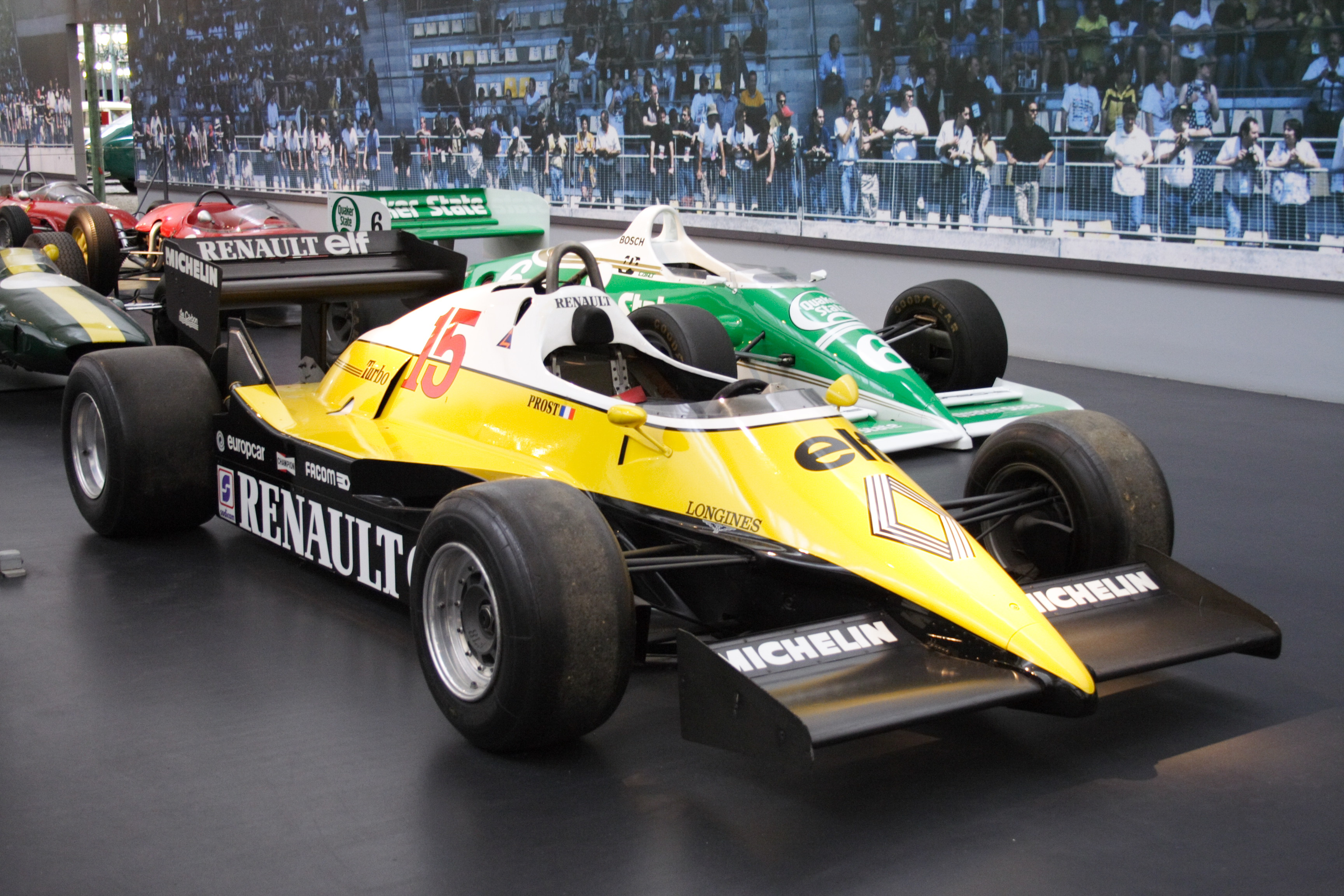
Alain Prost's Renault RE40 from the 1983 season at Mulhouse

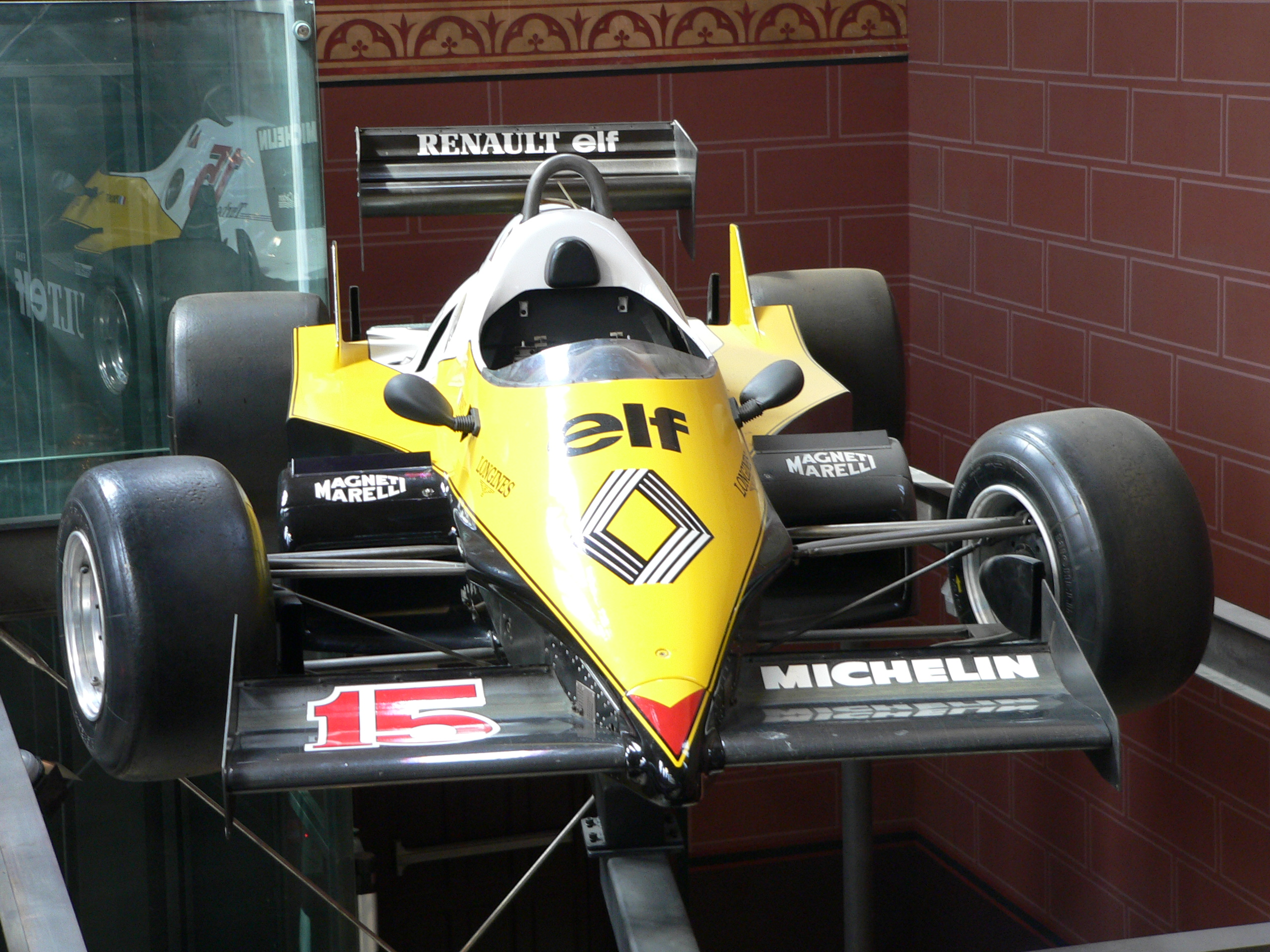
Prost's Renault RE40 in display

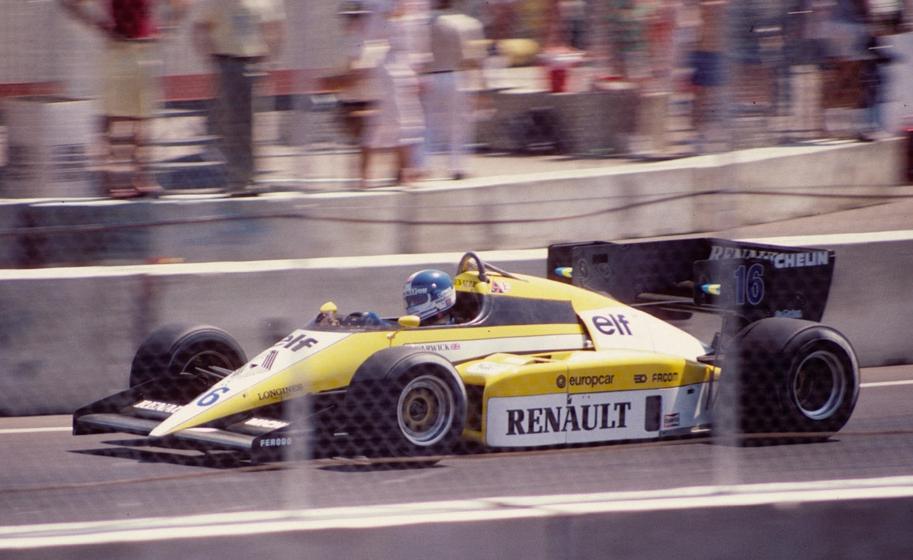
Derek Warwick driving his Renault in the 1984 Dallas Grand Prix

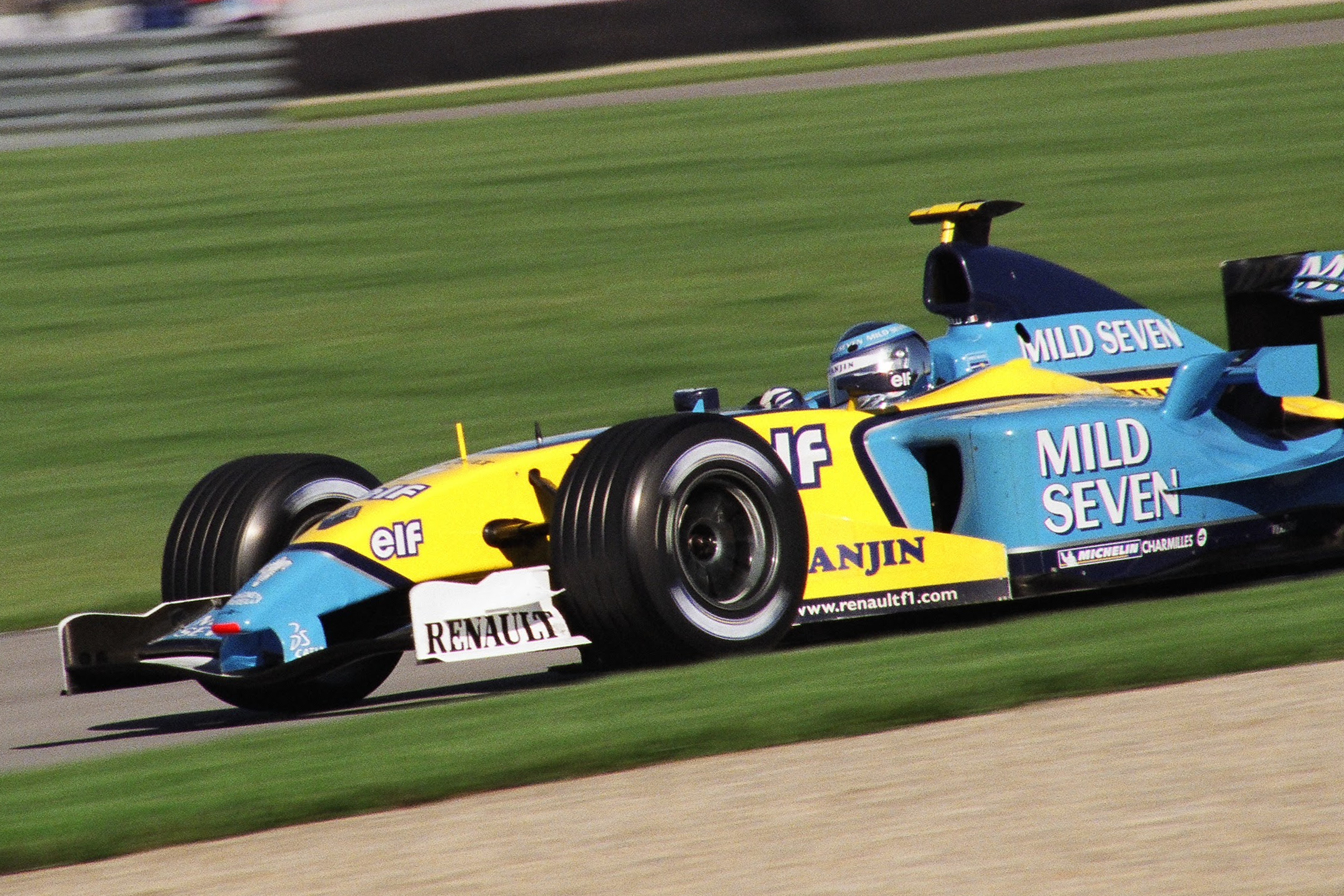
Renault's return in 2002 saw the traditional yellow combined with the light blue of Mild Seven. This is Jarno Trulli driving the Renault R23 in 2003

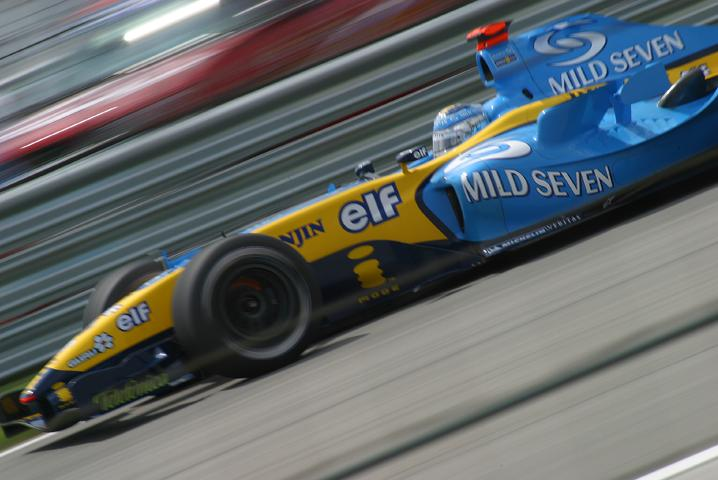
Jarno Trulli driving the Renault R24 at the 2004 United States Grand Prix.

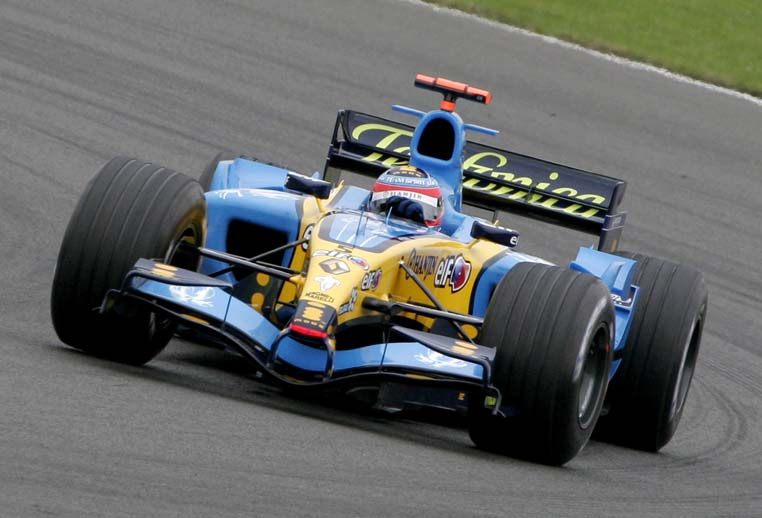
Renault's employment of Fernando Alonso (shown driving the Renault R25 at the 2005 British Grand Prix) also saw Telefónica become a major sponsor of the team.

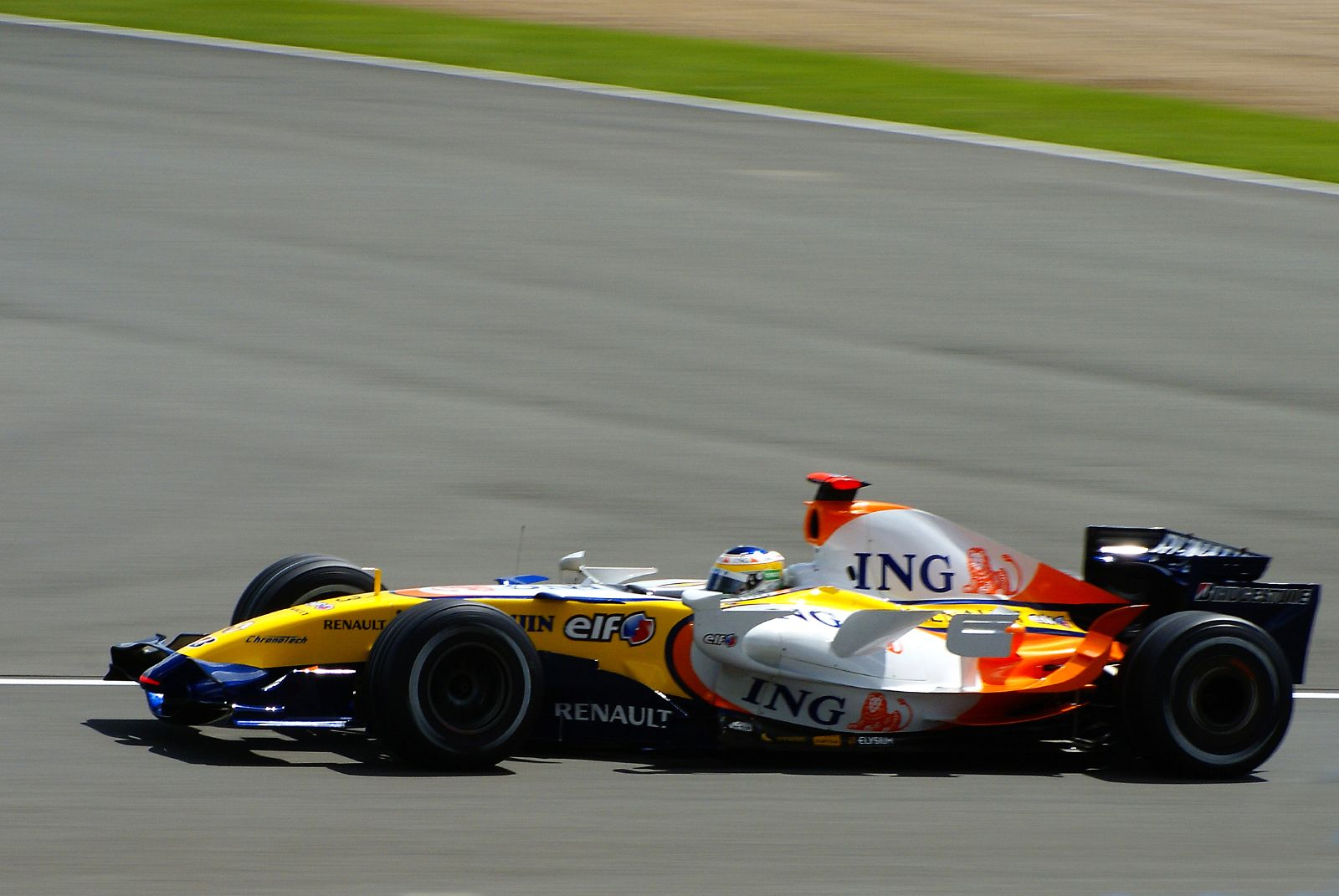
For 2007, Renault switched from Mild Seven to ING. This is Giancarlo Fisichella driving the Renault R27 at the 2007 British Grand Prix.

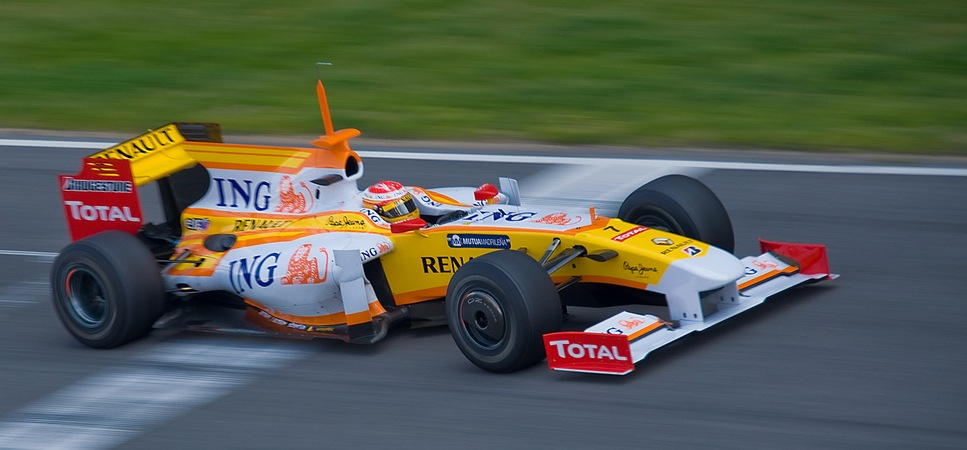
For 2009, Renault changed from Elf to Total by fuel. This is Fernando Alonso testing in Circuit de Catalunya, 2009

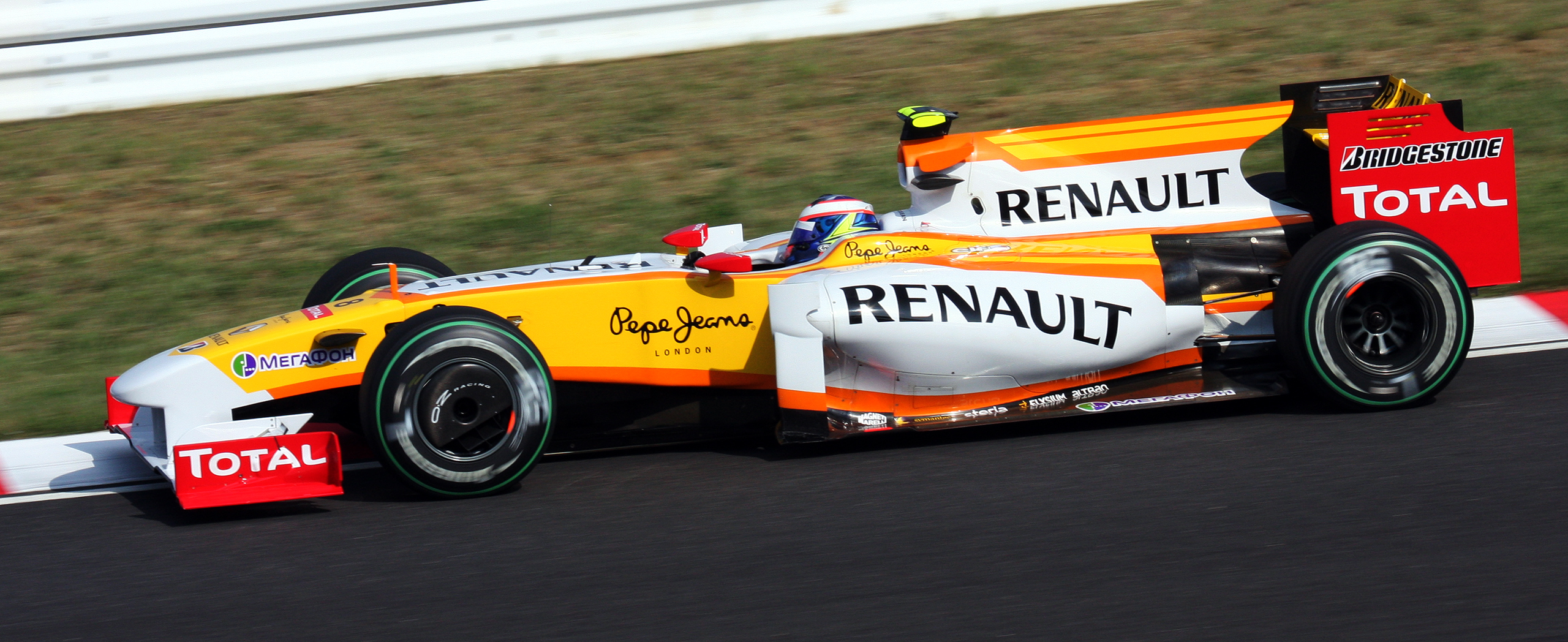
The livery used on the Renault R29 after ING Group withdrew its support.

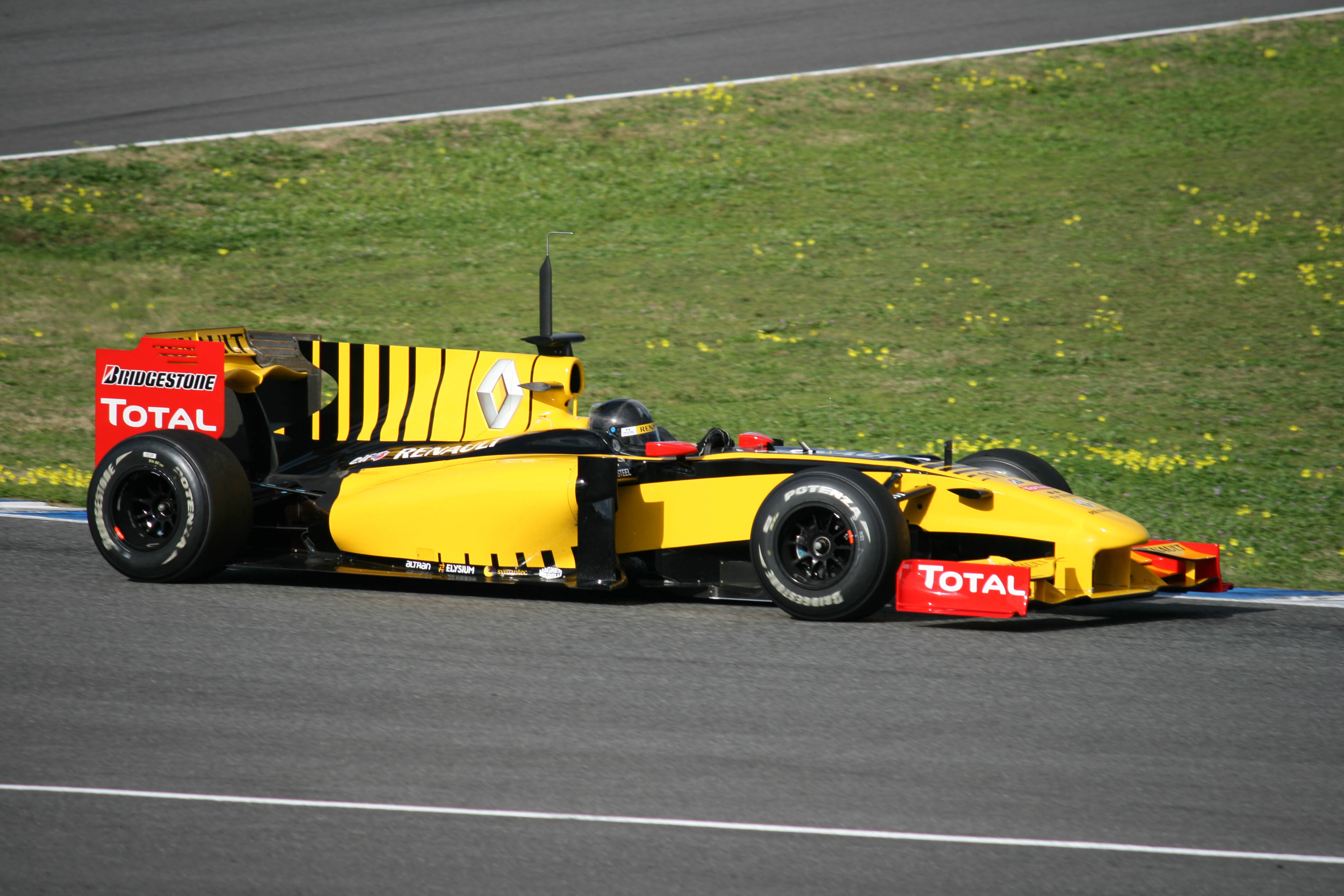
Robert Kubica testing for Renault F1 at Jerez, February 2010.

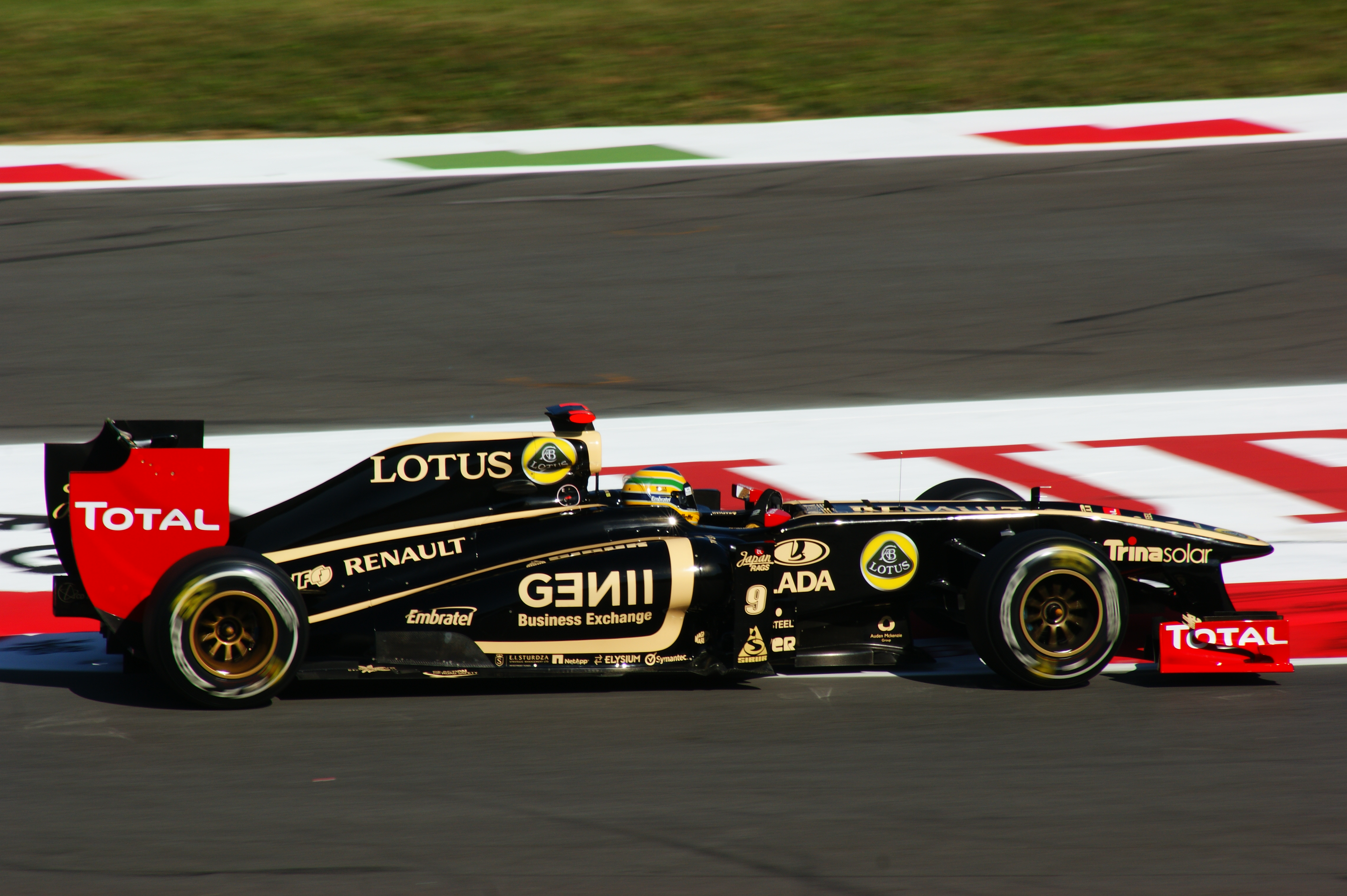
Bruno Senna racing for Renault F1 at the 2011 Italian Grand Prix.

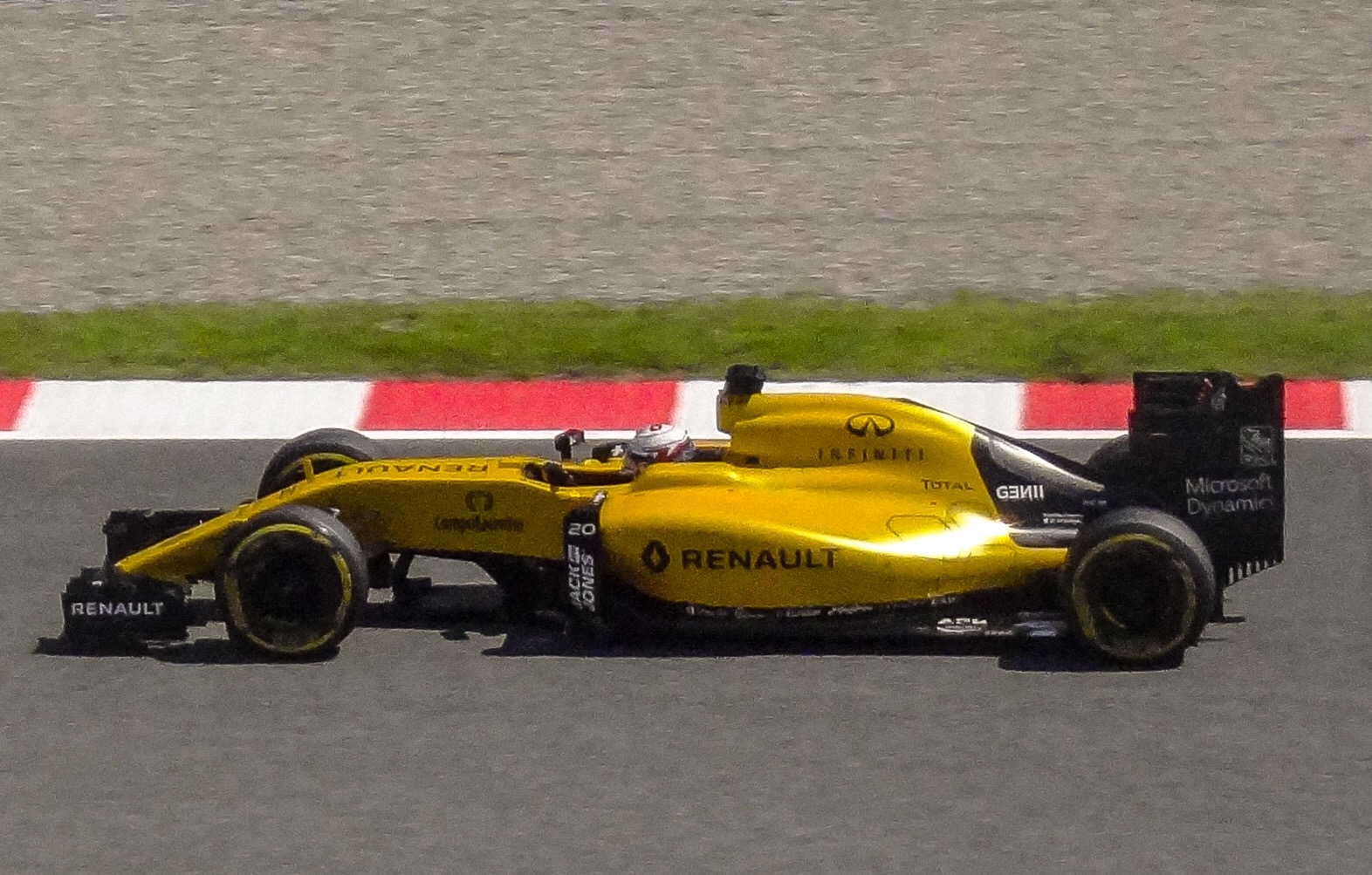
Kevin Magnussen at the 2016 Spanish Grand Prix

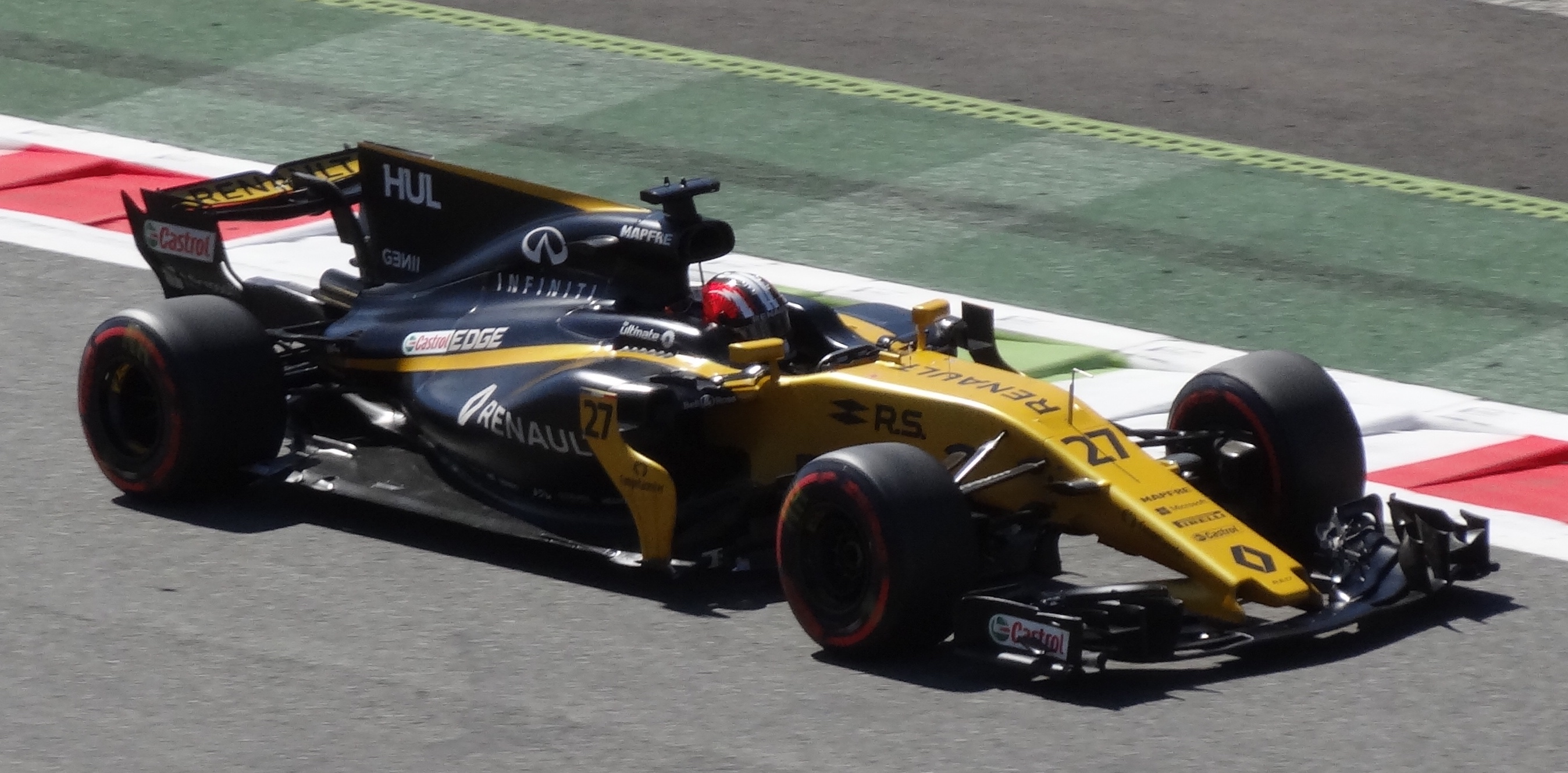
Nico Hülkenberg driving the Renault R.S.17 at the 2017 Italian Grand Prix

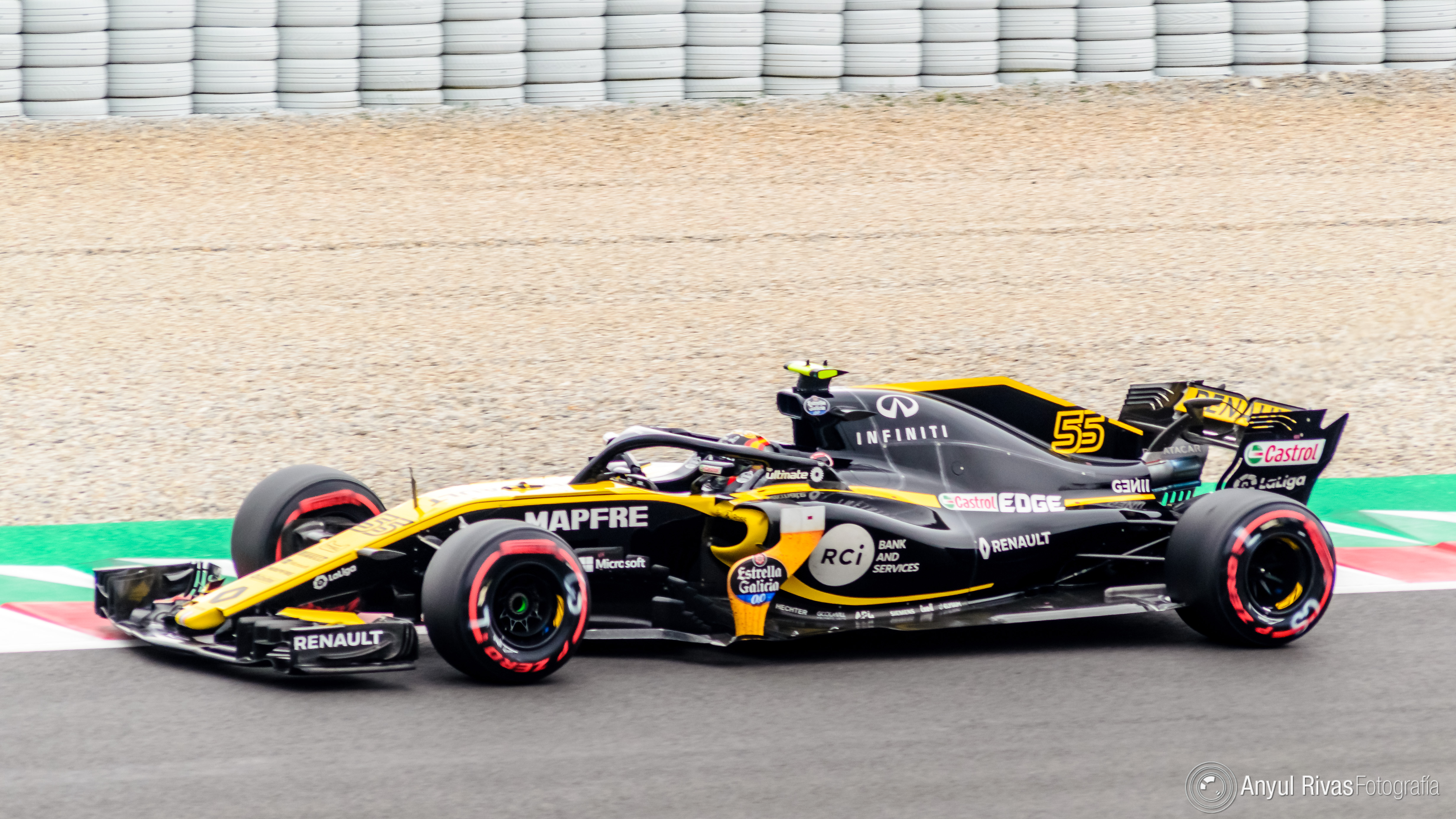
Carlos Sainz driving the Renault R.S18 at the 2018 Spanish Grand Prix

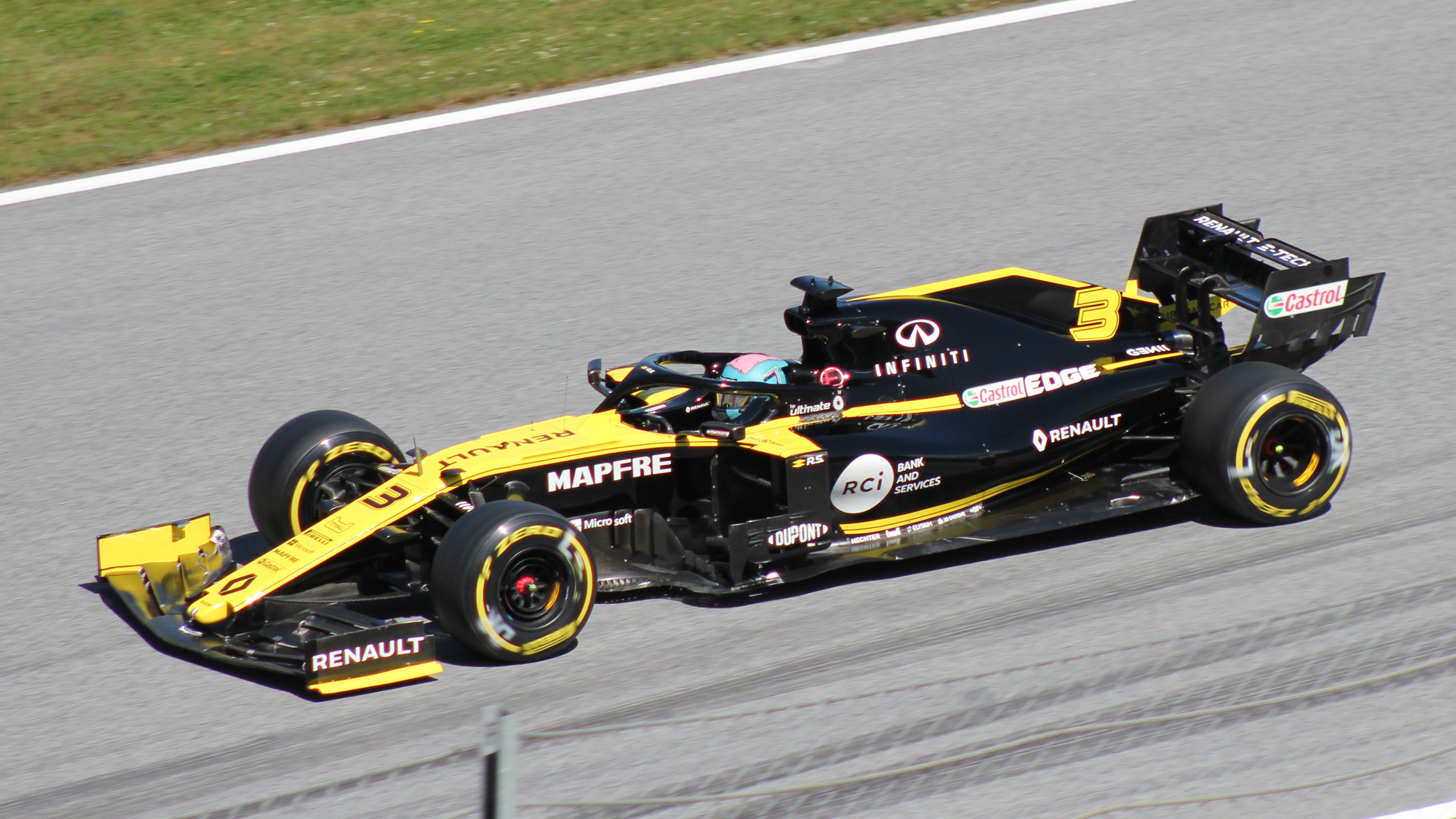
Daniel Ricciardo driving the Renault R.S.19 at the 2019 Hungarian Grand Prix

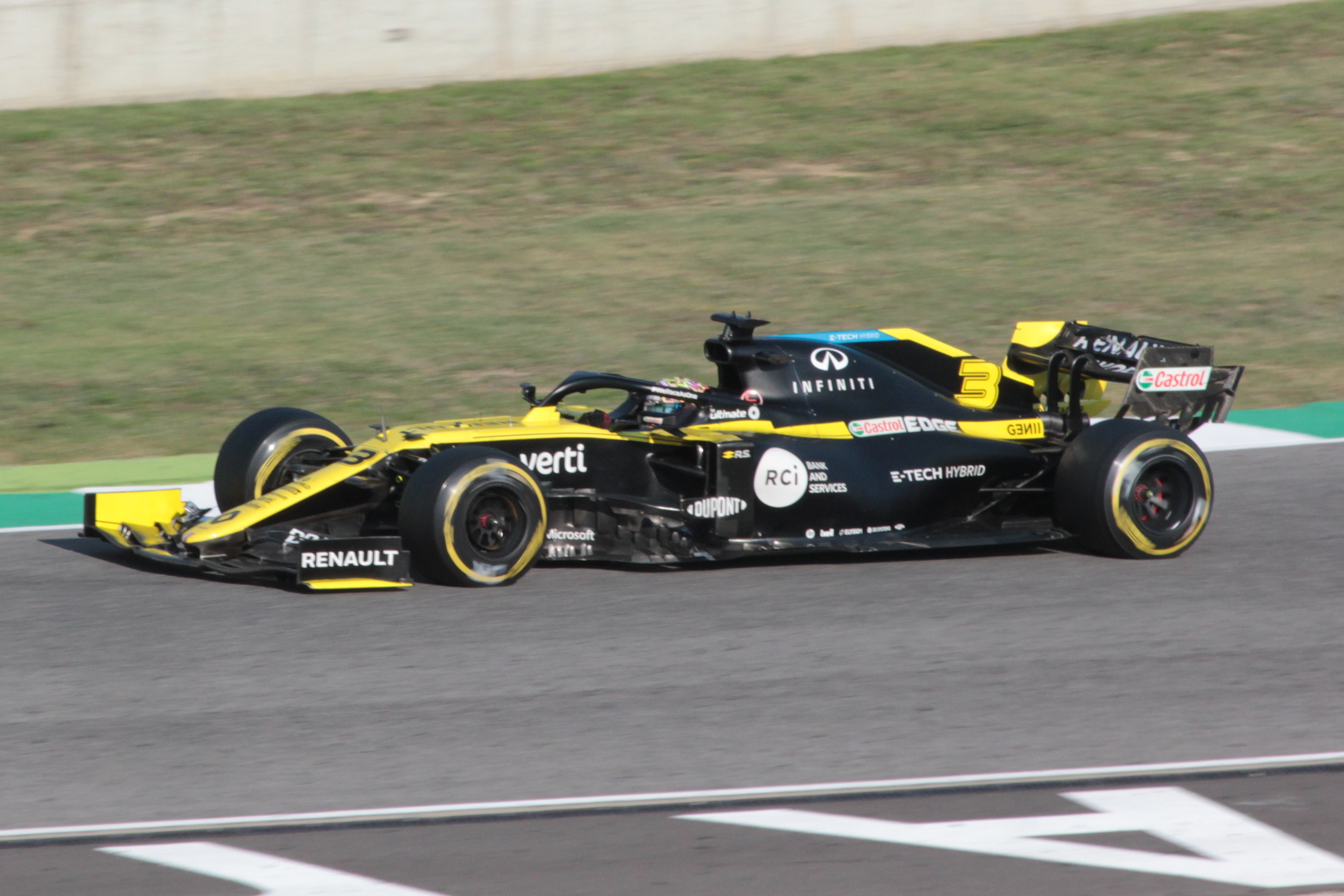
Daniel Ricciardo driving the Renault R.S.20 at the 2020 Tuscan Grand Prix

== Rial ==
Year	Main colour(s)	Additional colour(s)	Main sponsor(s)	Additional major sponsor(s)
1988	Blue	Black, White	Rial Wheels, Bobson Jeans	Marlboro, STP, Alpine, Tamoil
1989	Blue	Light Blue, Black, White	Rial Wheels	Marlboro, STP, Behr, Einbach, Goodyear

== Sauber ==
Sauber is a Swiss Formula One constructor that joined the Formula One grid in 1993. Sauber was bought by BMW at the end of the 2005 season and the team competed as BMW Sauber F1 Team from 2006 to 2009. On 27 November 2009, BMW agreed to sell the team back to its original founder, Peter Sauber. The 2010 season marked Sauber's return as an independent constructor. Sauber was rebranded and competed as Alfa Romeo Racing (later Alfa Romeo F1 Team) from 2019 to 2023 in a title sponsorship deal with Alfa Romeo. Sauber will compete as the Audi factory team in 2026.

Year	Main colour(s)	Additional colour(s)	Livery sponsor(s)	Additional major sponsor(s)	Other Changes
1993	Black	White		Liqui Moly, Mercedes-Benz, Elf, Lightouse, Broker Goodyear	
1994	Black	White, Red	Tissot, Broker	Mercedes-Benz, Harvard, Sonax, Castrol, Magneti Marelli	In the Canadian GP, the sidepods of Andrea de Cesaris's car featured "Forza Andrea" ("Go Andrea"), "200 Gran Premi" ("200 Grands Prix") and "In bocca al lupo!" ("Good luck!") and the car was decorated with pink and yellow stripes, each of which was a first name of what appears to be team personnel.
1995	Navy Blue	Yellow, Red	Red Bull	Ford, Petronas, Goodyear	
1996	Blue	Turquoise, Red, Yellow	Red Bull	Ford, Petronas, Goodyear, Brembo	
1997–1998	Blue	Turquoise, Red, Yellow	Red Bull, Petronas	Goodyear, Catia Solutions, Silicon Graphics, Magneti Marelli	
1999–2002	Blue	Turquoise, Red, Yellow	Red Bull, Petronas, Parmalat (1999–2000), Credit Suisse (2001–2002)	Bridgestone, Brastemp (1999–2000), Temenos (2001–2002), Emil Frey, fkg.com (2000–2001), Catia Solutions, Magneti Marelli	For the final three races in 2002, "Stop AIDS" placed on the bargeboards
2003–2004	Blue	Turquoise, Red, Yellow, White	Red Bull, Petronas	Bridgestone, Credit Suisse, Emil Frey, MTS GSM, Magneti Marelli, Taikang Life (2004), Sokhna Port (2004)	
2005	Blue	Turquoise, Yellow, White	Petronas	Michelin, Credit Suisse, MTS GSM	
2006–2009	see BMW Sauber				
2010	White, Dark Grey	Red	Club One	Certina, Bridgestone, Scalp-D, Burger King, Emil Frey, Mad Croc Energy	
2011	White, Dark Grey	Red	Claro	Telmex, Disensa, Telcel, NEC, José Cuervo, Interproteccion, AsiaJet, Certina, Emil Frey, Mad Croc, Nabholz, Pirelli	The José Cuervo ad was for Cuervo Tequila except for Turkish and Abu Dhabi, where their Cholula Hot Sauce replaced the drink because of prohibitions on alcohol advertising.
2012	White, Dark Grey	Red	Claro	Telmex, Telcel, NEC, Chelsea F.C., Disensa, José Cuervo, Interproteccion, Certina, Emil Frey, Nabholz, Pirelli	The José Cuervo ad was for Cuervo Tequila except for Bahrain and Abu Dhabi, where their Cholula Hot Sauce replaced the drink because of prohibitions on alcohol advertising.
2013	Dark Grey, White	Red, Silver	Claro	Telmex, Telcel, NEC, OC Oerlikon, Chelsea F.C., José Cuervo, Interproteccion, Certina, Emil Frey, Pirelli	The José Cuervo ad was for Cuervo Tequila except for Bahrain and Abu Dhabi, where their Cholula Hot Sauce replaced the drink because of prohibitions on alcohol advertising.
2014	Dark Grey, White	Red, Silver	Claro	Telmex, Telcel, NEC, OC Oerlikon, Chelsea F.C., José Cuervo, Interproteccion, Certina, Emil Frey, Pirelli, McGregor	The José Cuervo ad was for Cuervo Tequila except for Bahrain and Abu Dhabi, where their Cholula Hot Sauce replaced the drink because of prohibitions on alcohol advertising.
2015	Blue	Yellow, White	Banco do Brasil	Pirelli, Oerlikon, Chelsea F.C., Emil Frey, Certina, Silanna, Swiss Fibertec	
2016	Blue	Yellow, White	Banco do Brasil	CNBC, IFS, Malbuner Power Slice, Edox, Emil Frey, Silanna, Pirelli, MODO Eyewear	
2017	Blue	White, Gold		CNBC, Silanna, Pirelli, Edox, MODO Eyewear, Erreà	
2018	White	Red, Blue	Alfa Romeo	Silanna, Carrera, Claro, Richard Mille, Kappa, Pirelli	
2019–2023	see Alfa Romeo				
2024	Black	Green	Stake/Kick	Pirelli, Singha, WhistlePig, Magneti Marelli, Grupo Nossa, Everdome, Accelleron, AMX, Cielo, Curam Domi, Camozzi Group, CryptoDATA (Wispr), Rebellion, Web Eyewear, AximTrade, SenseTime, Seagate, Mascot Workwear, CODE-ZERO, Hyland, Corinthian Re, Ambrosial, Fix Network, Zero Petroleum, Aleph, GF, Sabelt, Edelweiss, Puma, Jig Space, Agilis	Like the previous season's Alfa Romeo, in countries where advertisement of gambling and sports betting are banned, Stake's branding will be replaced by Kick.
2025	Black, Green		Stake/Kick	Pirelli, Singha, Web Eyewear, SenseTime, Libertex, Mascot Workwear, CODE-ZERO, CoinPayments, Zero Petroleum, Fix Network, Cielo, Claro, Pic Pay, Aleph, GF, Sabelt, Edelweiss, Puma, Jig Space, Agilis	Like the previous season's Alfa Romeo, in countries where advertisement of gambling and sports betting are banned, Stake's branding will be replaced by Kick.

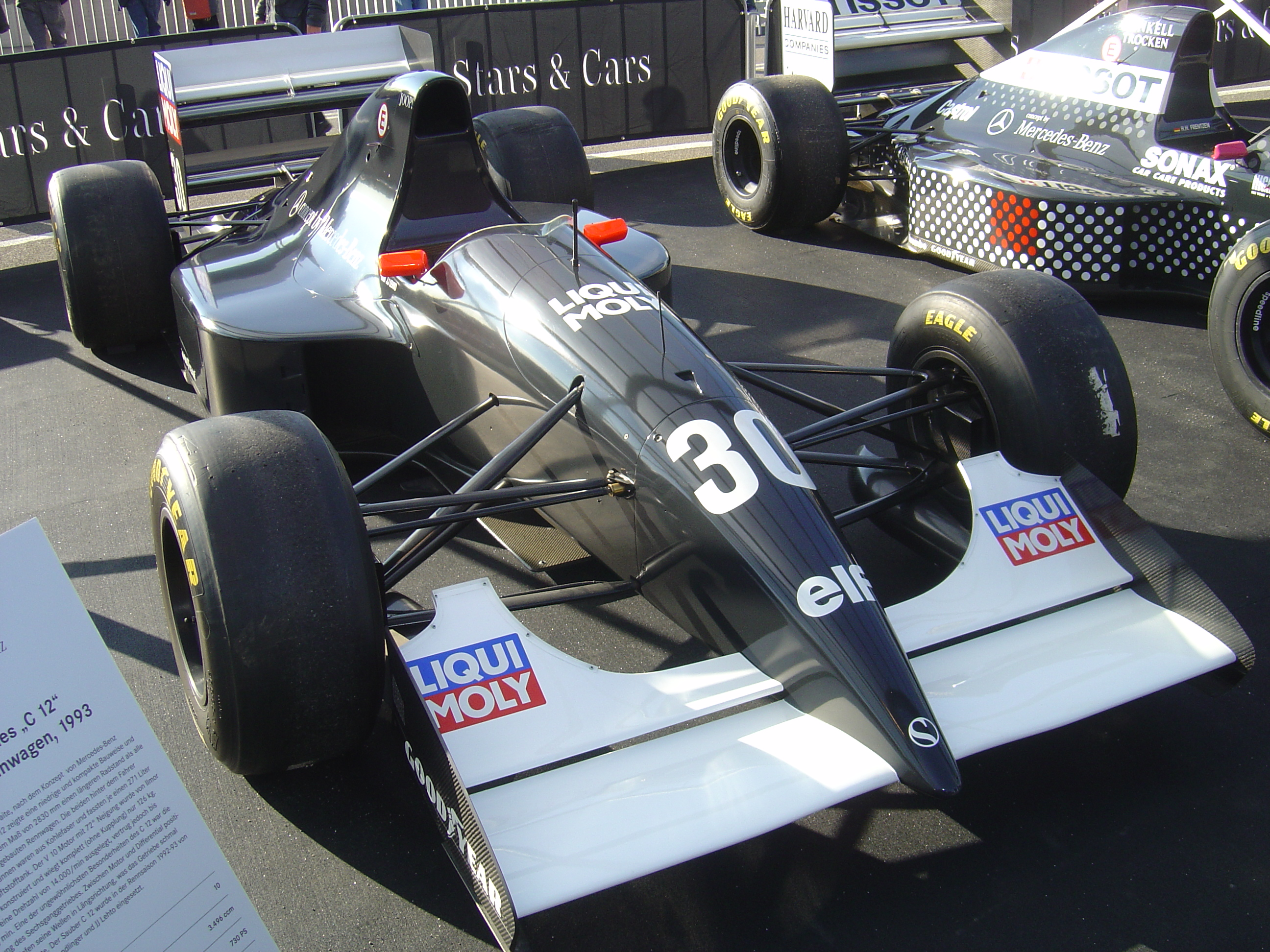
1993 Sauber C12, the first car, with its black livery.

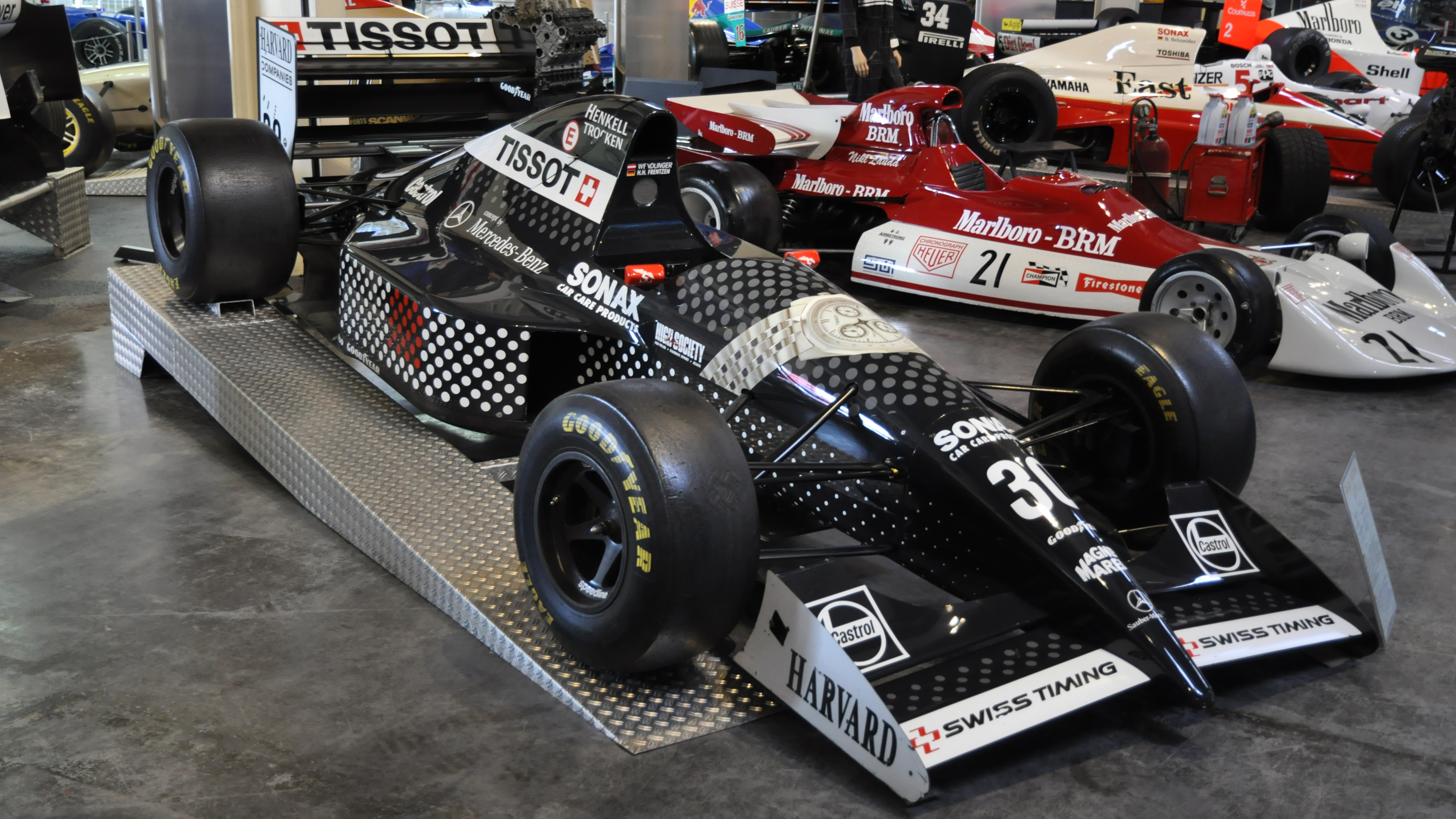
1994 Sauber C13 at the Auto und Technik Museum Sinsheim.

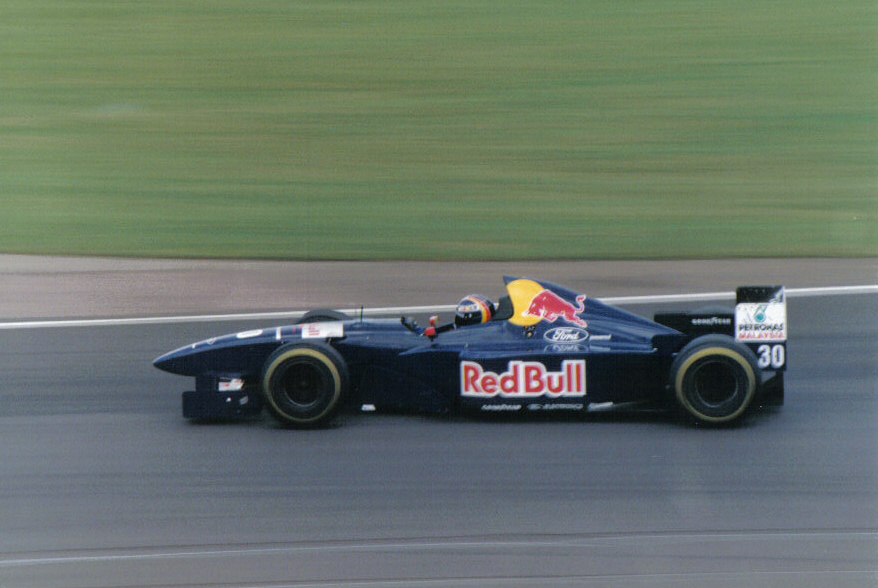
Heinz-Harald Frentzen driving for Sauber at the 1995 British Grand Prix.

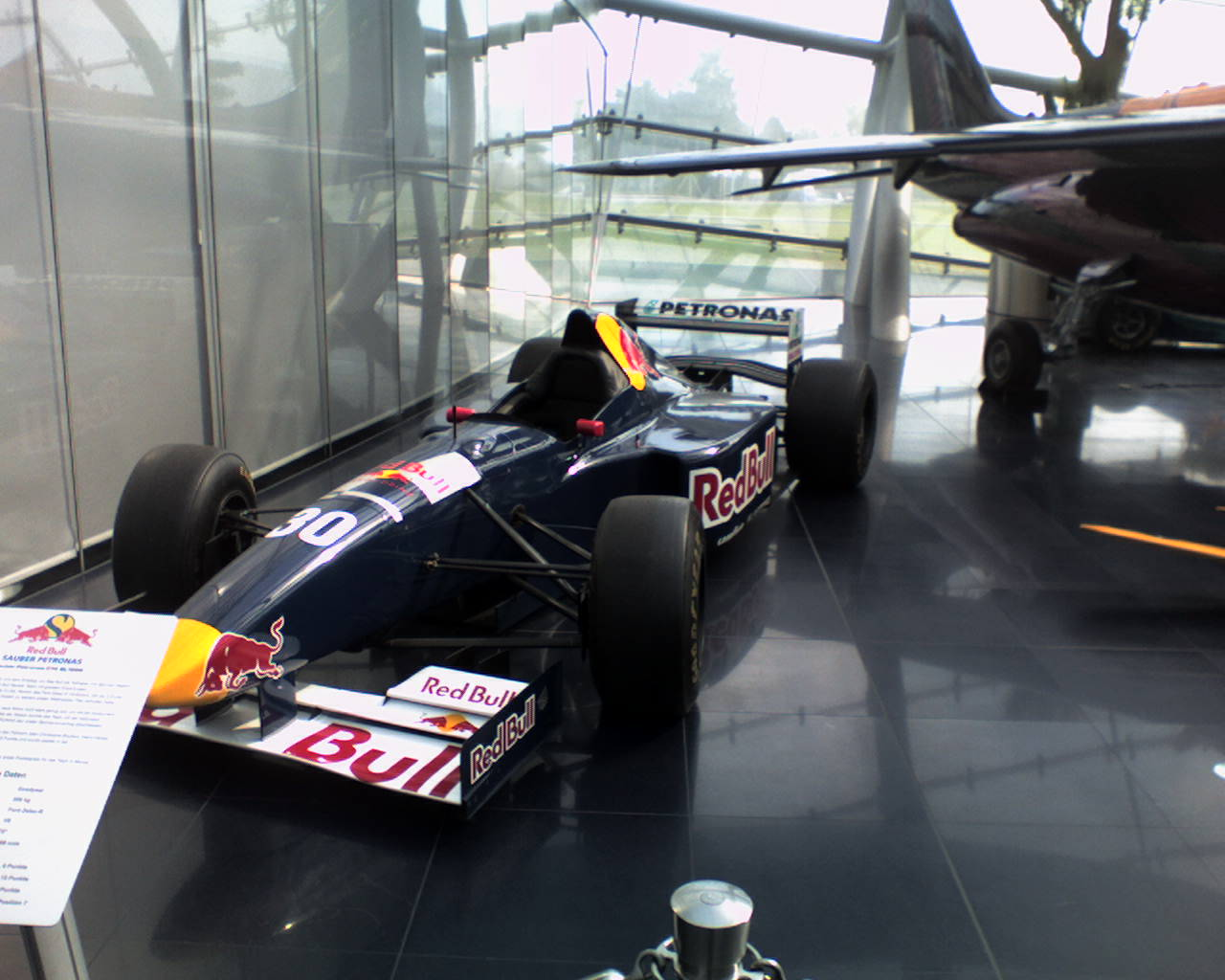
A Sauber C15 from 1995 in display at Red Bull Hangar-7

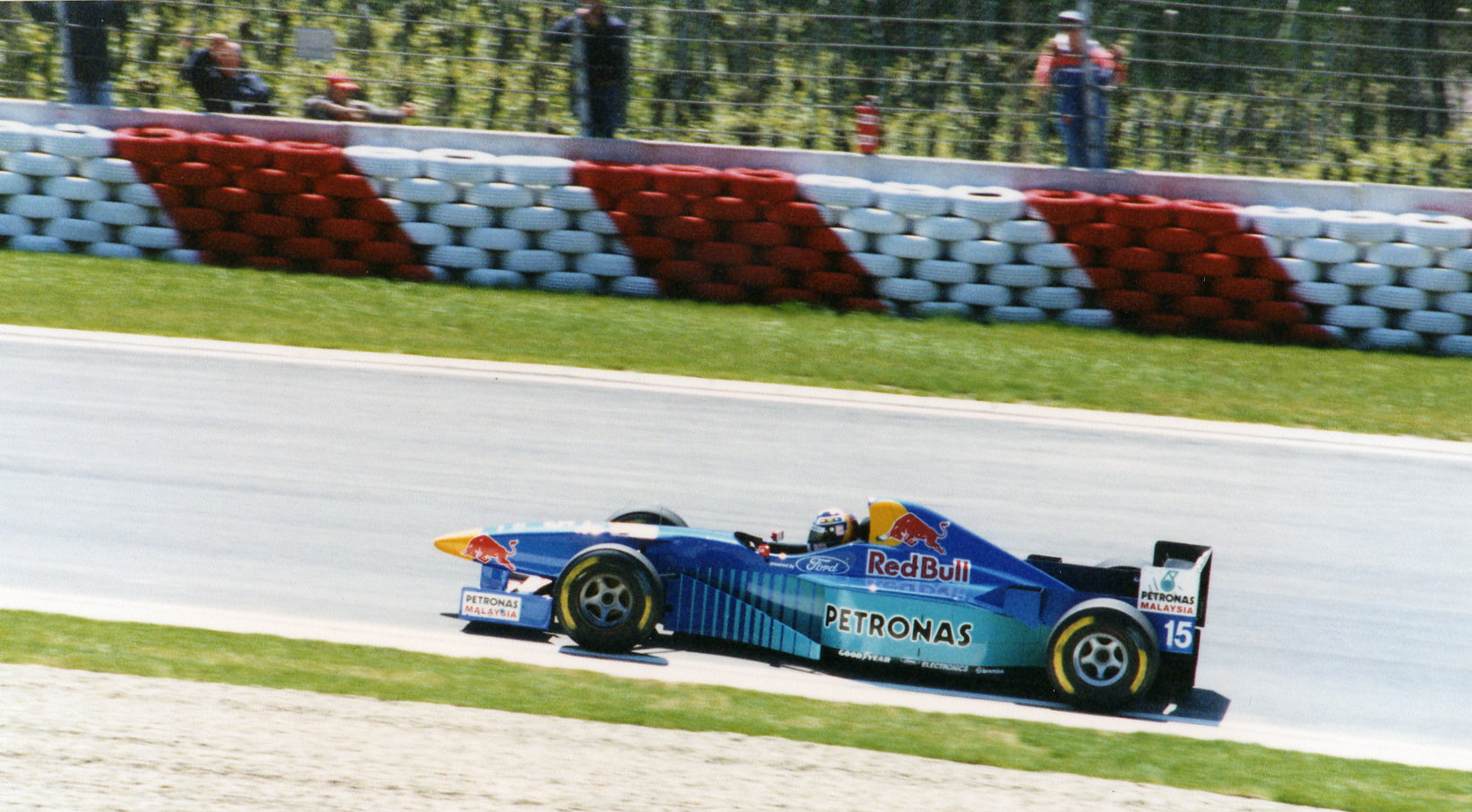
Heinz-Harald Frentzen driving the Sauber C15 at the 1996 San Marino Grand Prix

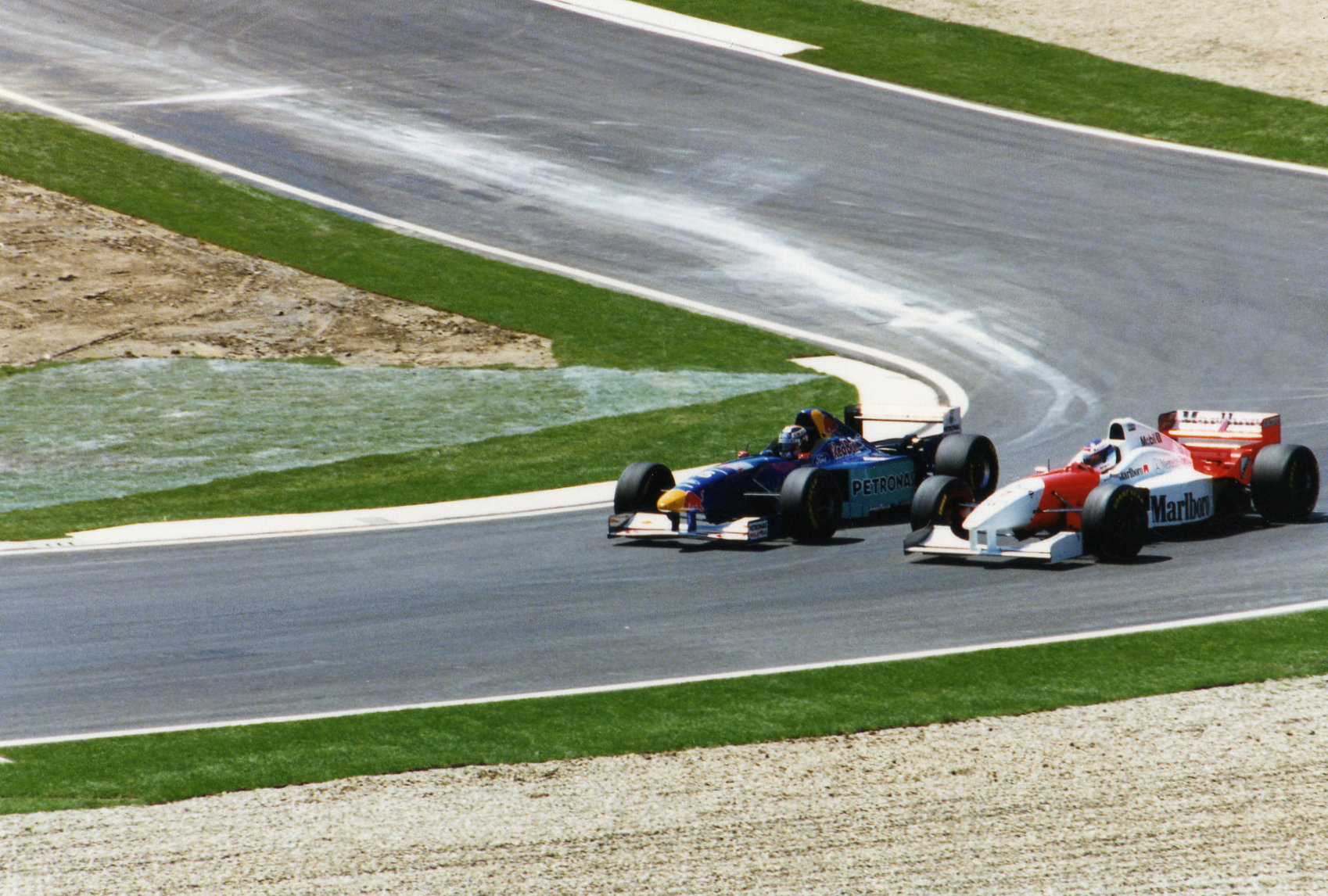
Frentzen's Sauber C15 overtaking Hakkinen's McLaren at Imola in 1996

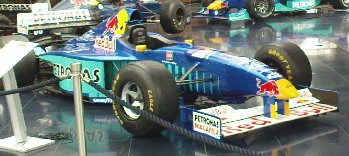
The Sauber C16 from 1997 season in display at Grassau.

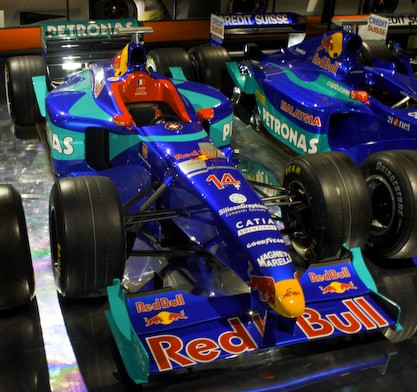
A Sauber C17 from the 1998 season.

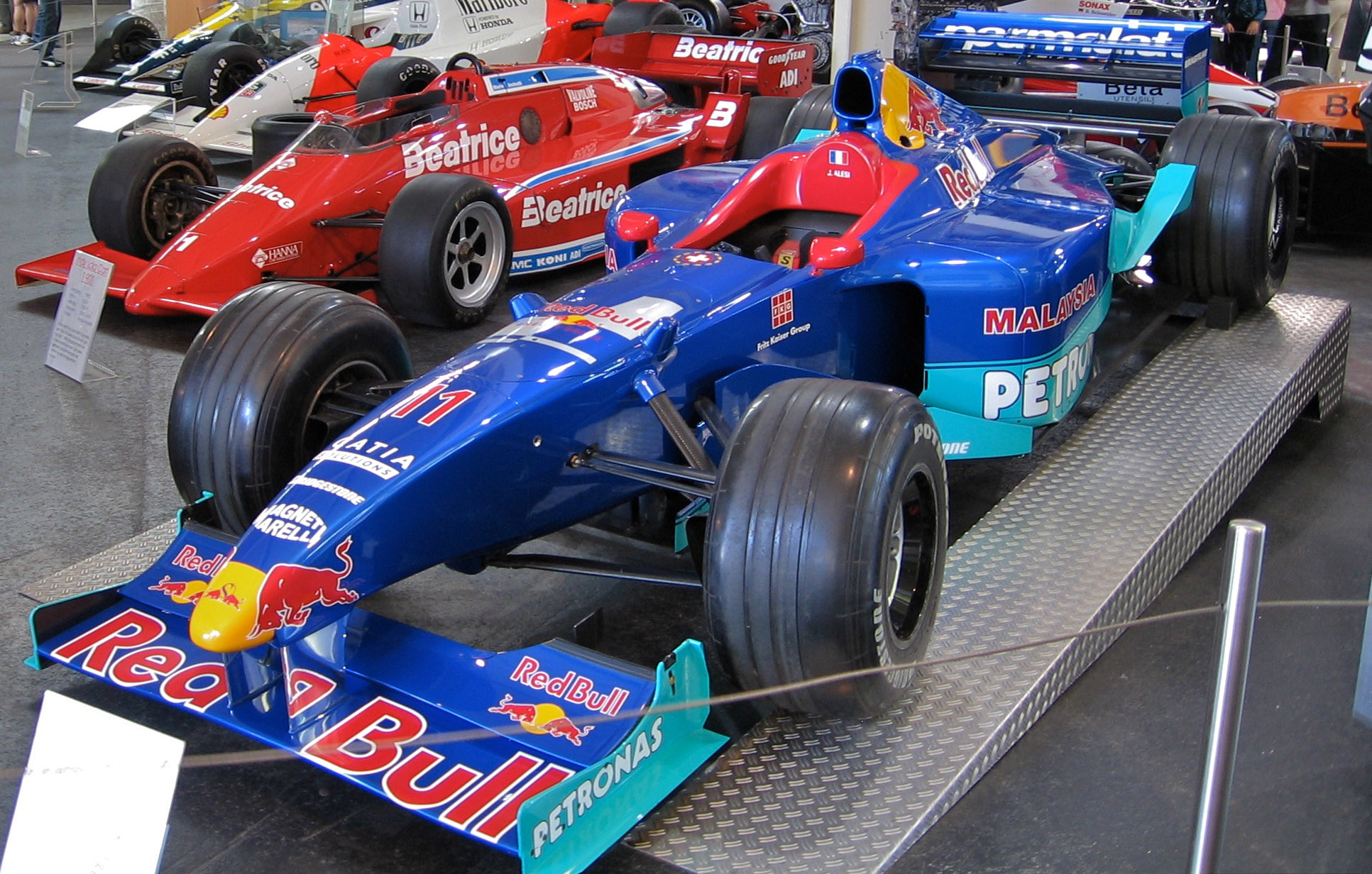
Jean Alesi's 1999 Sauber C18.

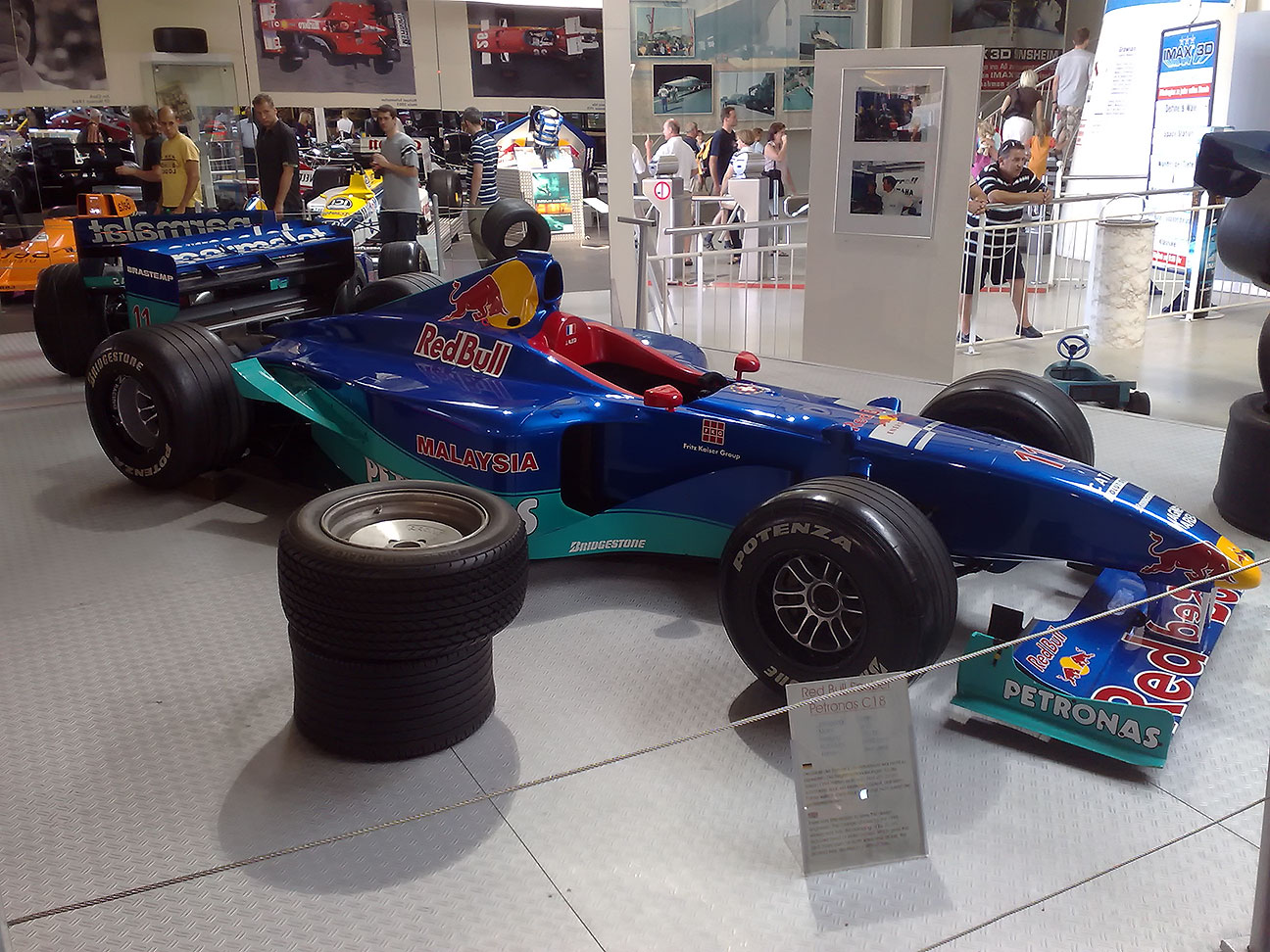
A Sauber C18 of 1999 season

Pedro Diniz driving for Sauber at the 2000 Canadian Grand Prix.

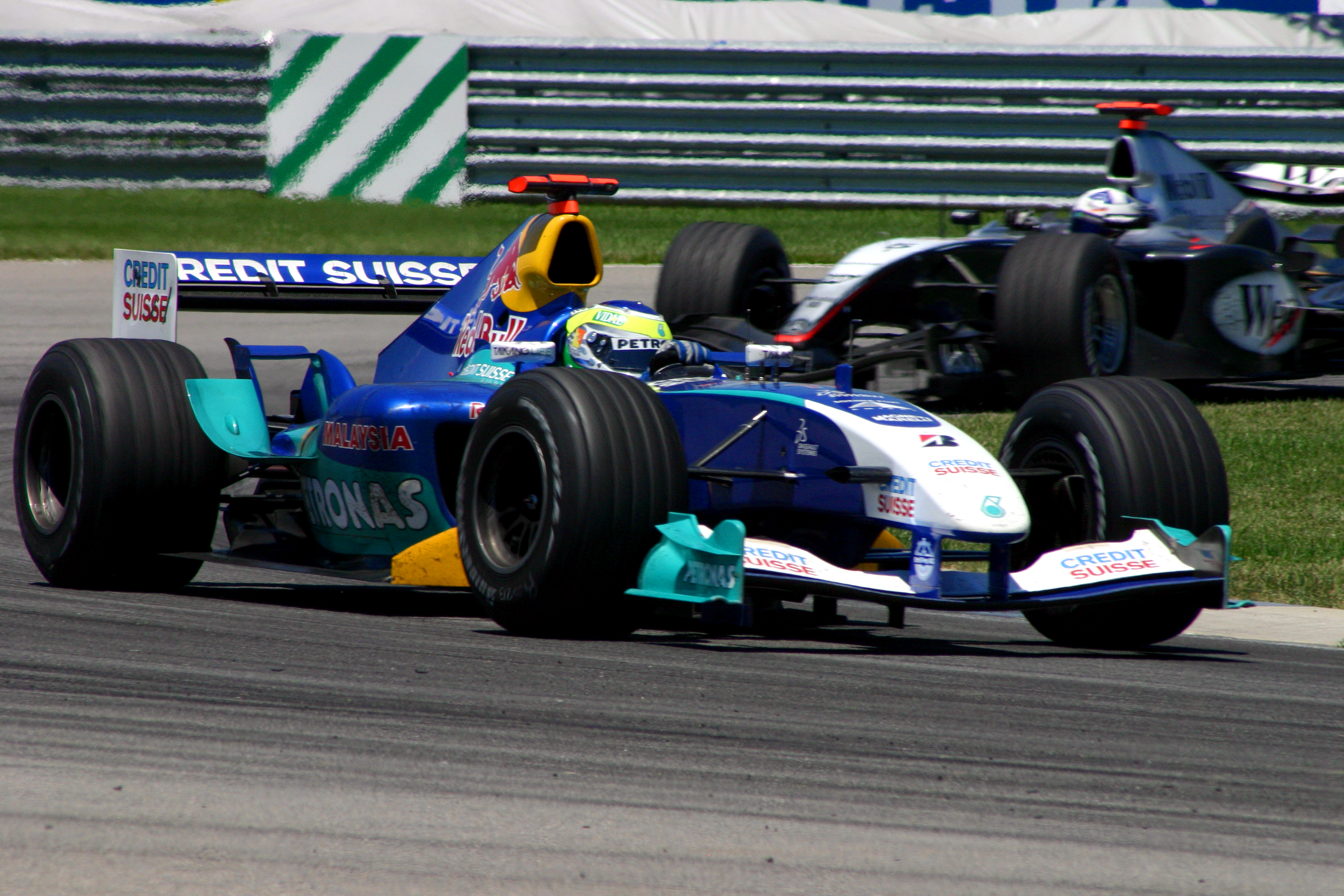
Giancarlo Fisichella driving the Sauber C23 at the US Grand Prix at Indianapolis, 2004.

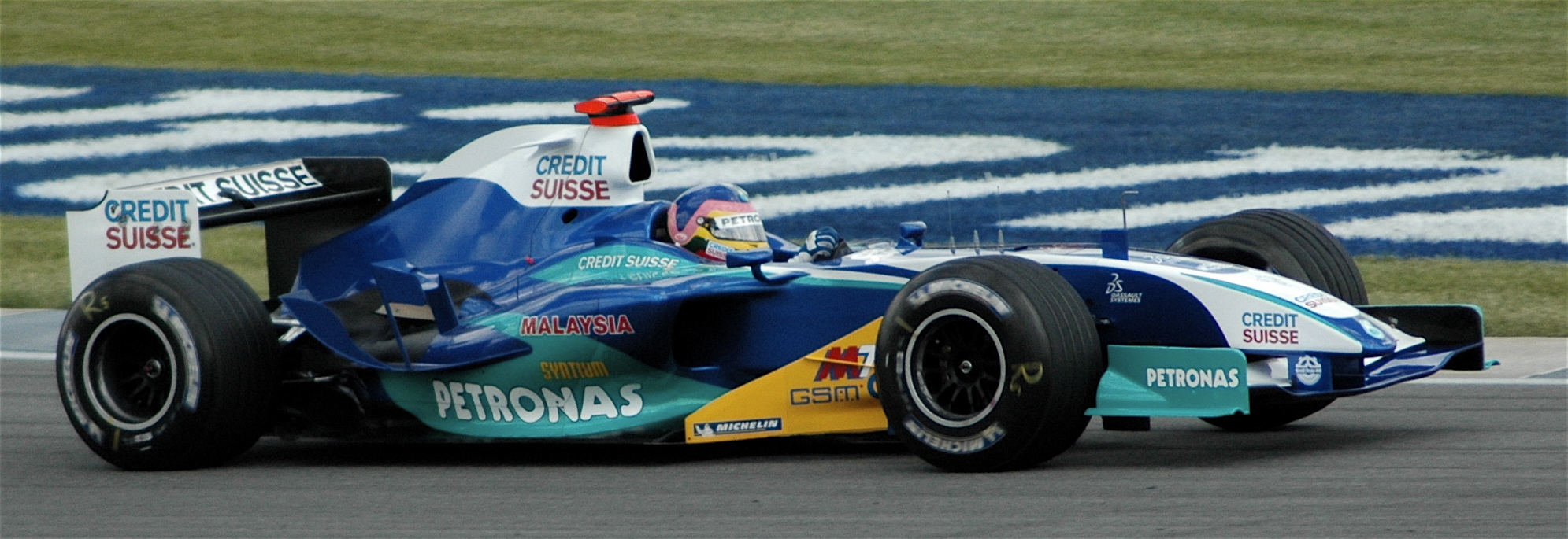
Jacques Villeneuve at the 2005 US Grand Prix.

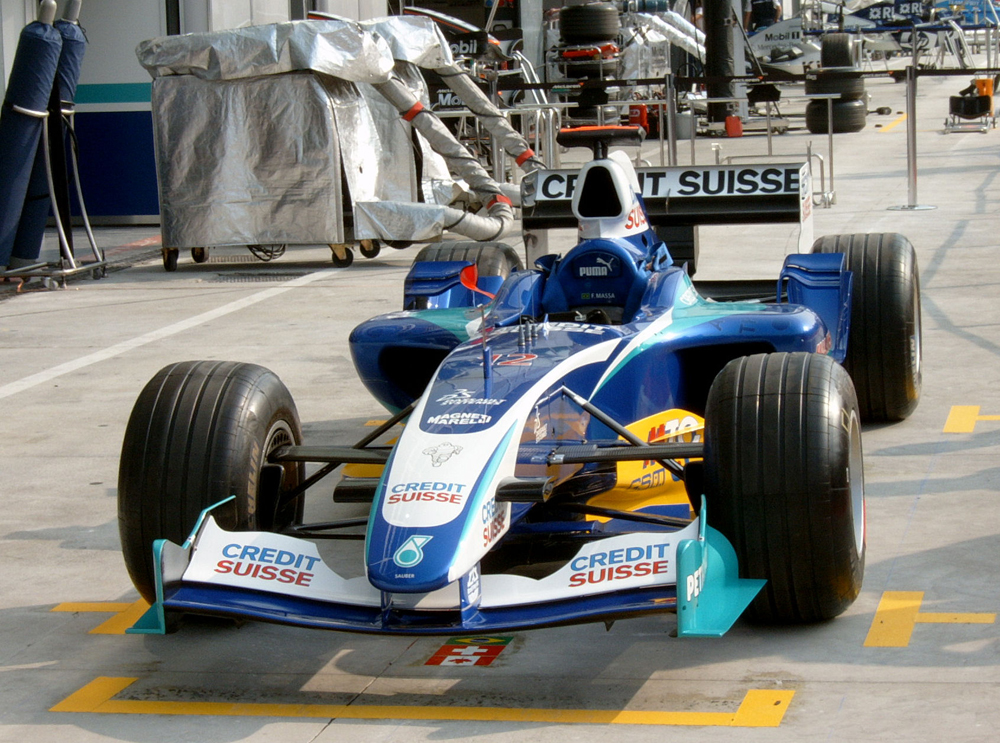
2005 Sauber C24.

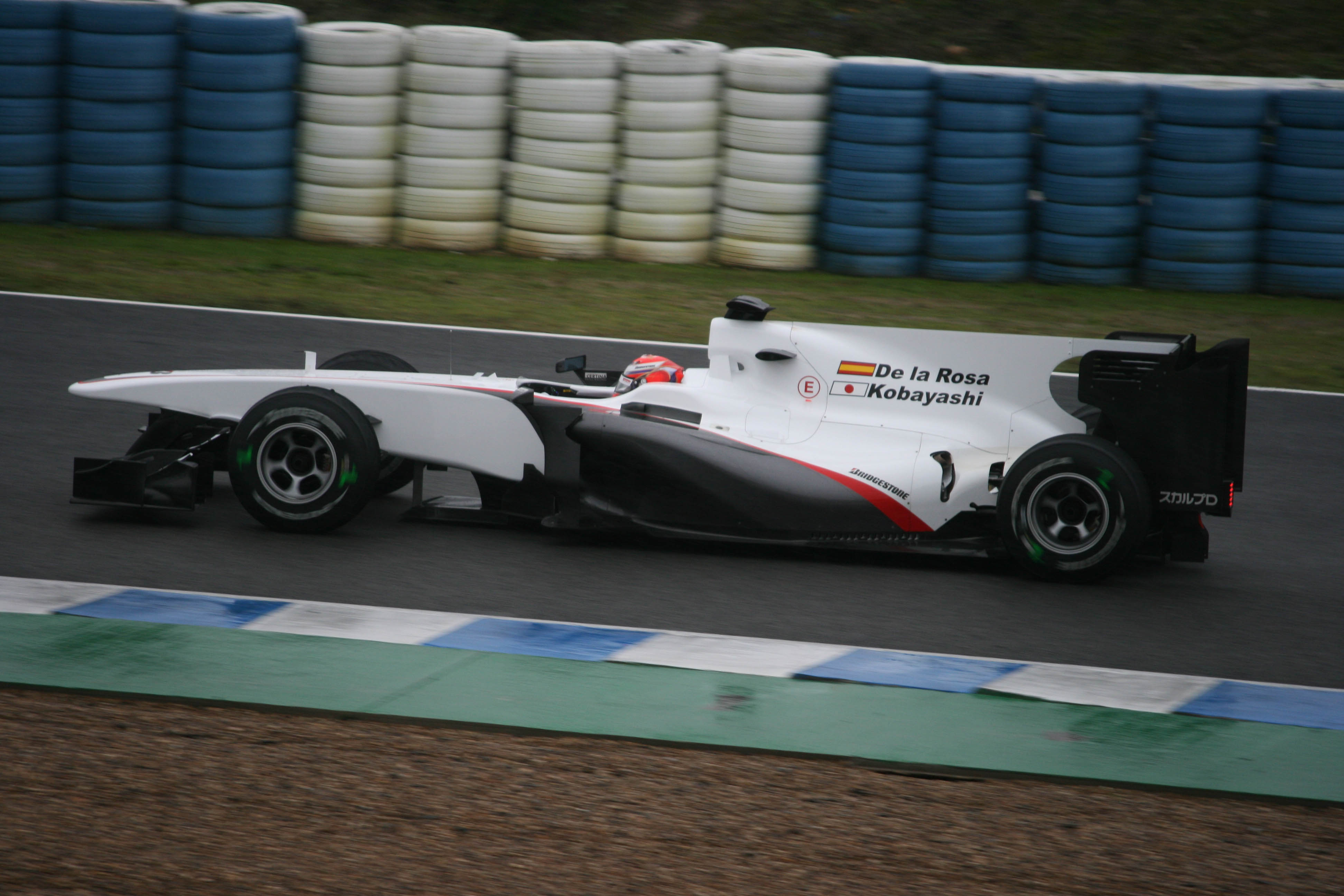
Kamui Kobayashi driving for BMW Sauber at Jerez, February 2010.

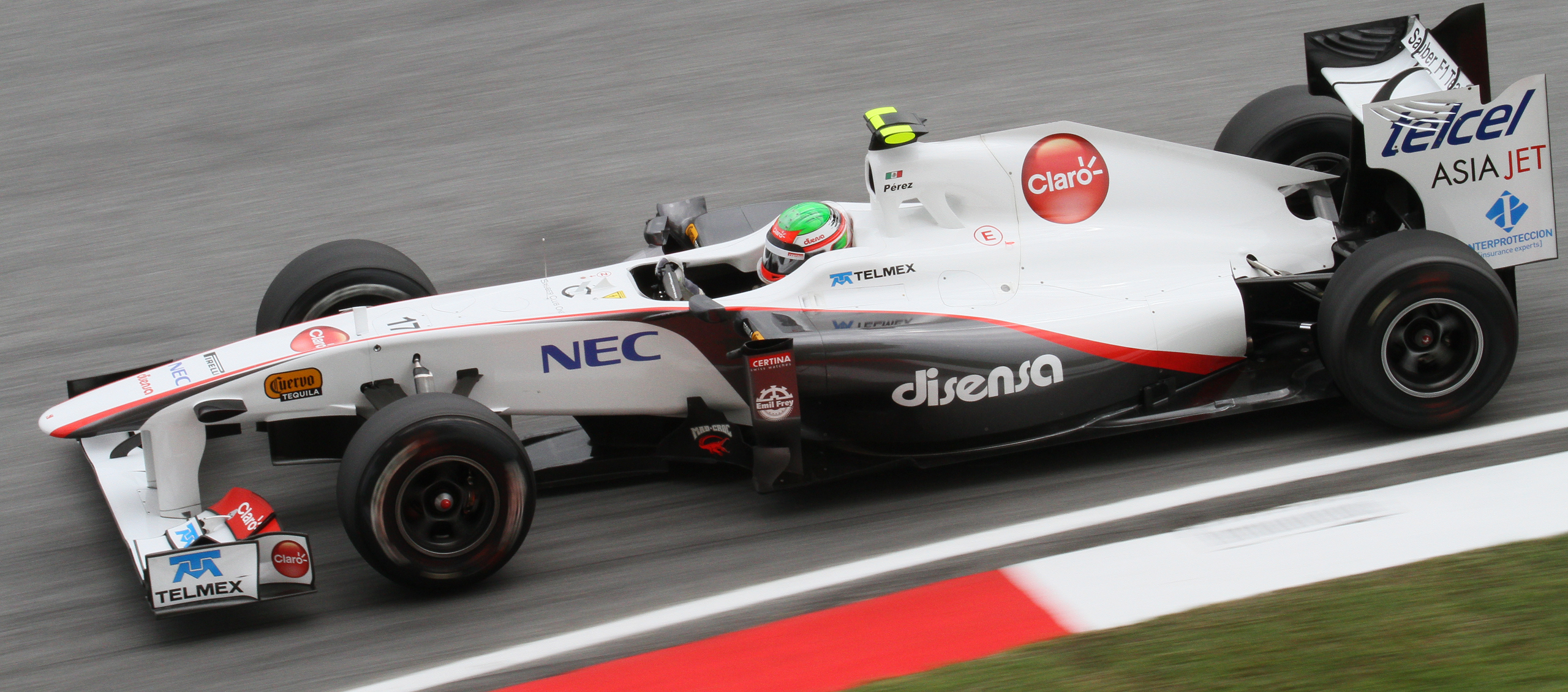
Sergio Pérez driving for Sauber at Sepang, 2011.

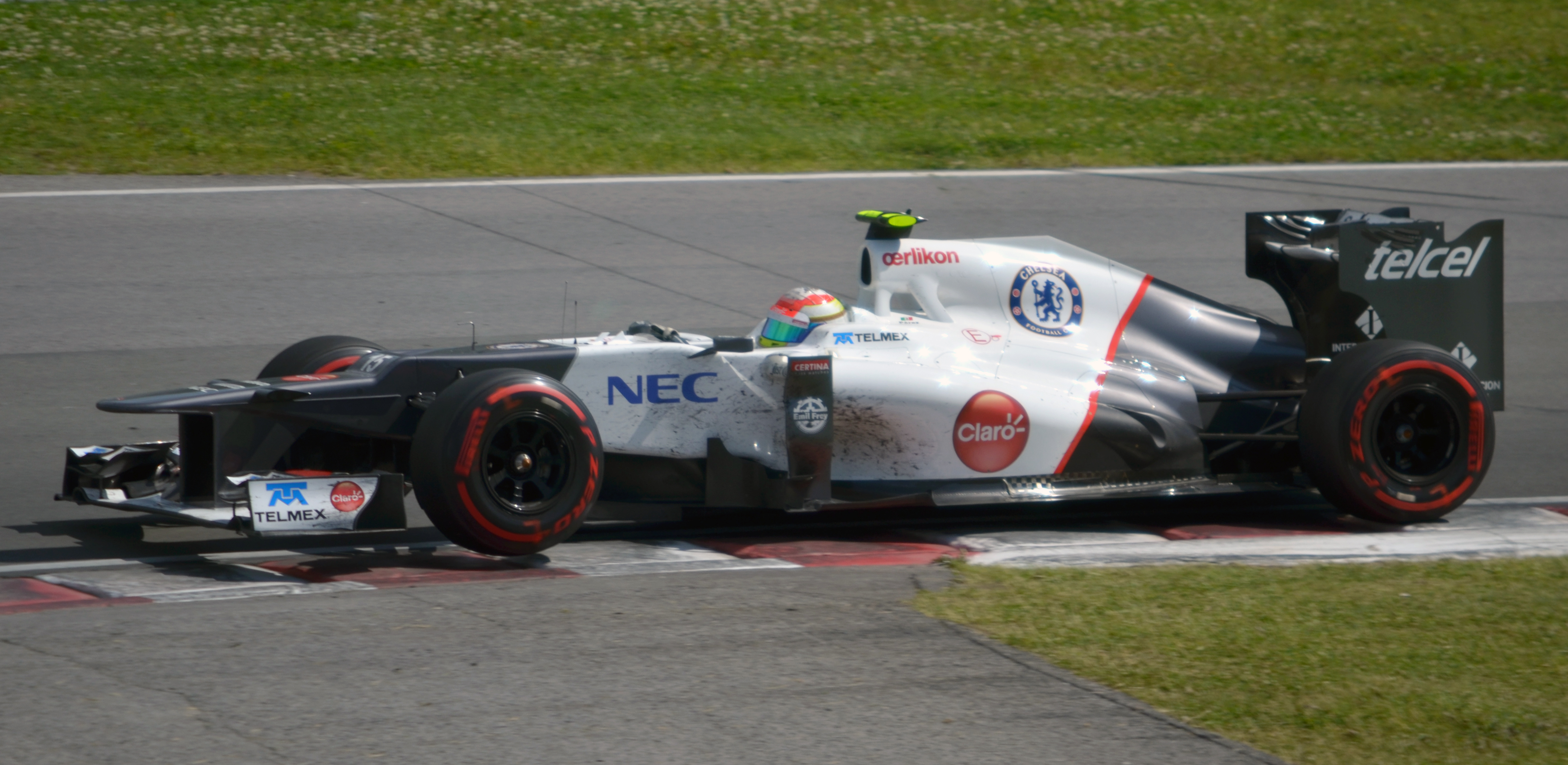
Sergio Pérez driving the Sauber C31 at 2012 Canadian Grand Prix.

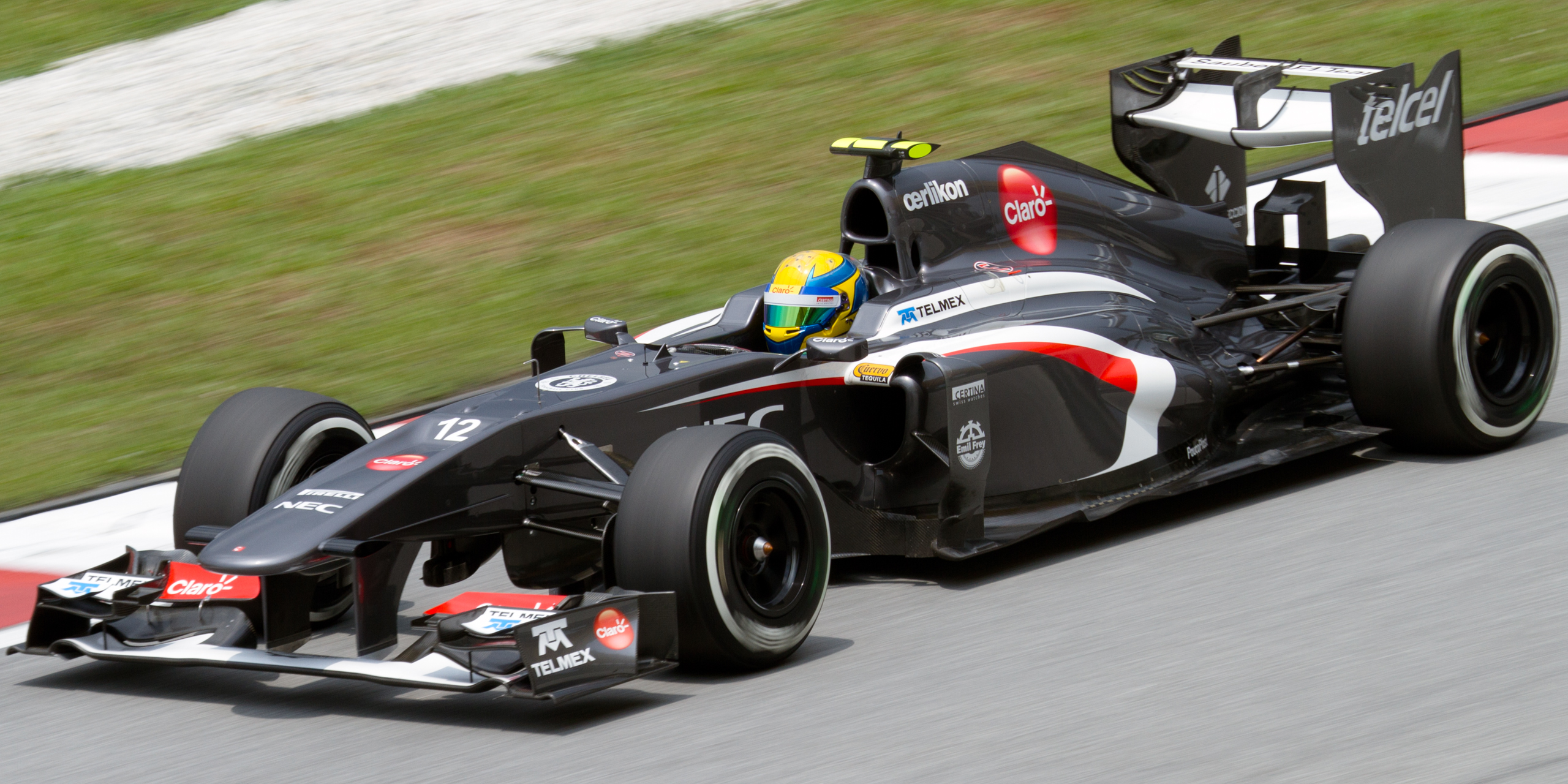
Esteban Gutiérrez driving the Sauber C32 at the 2013 Malaysian Grand Prix.

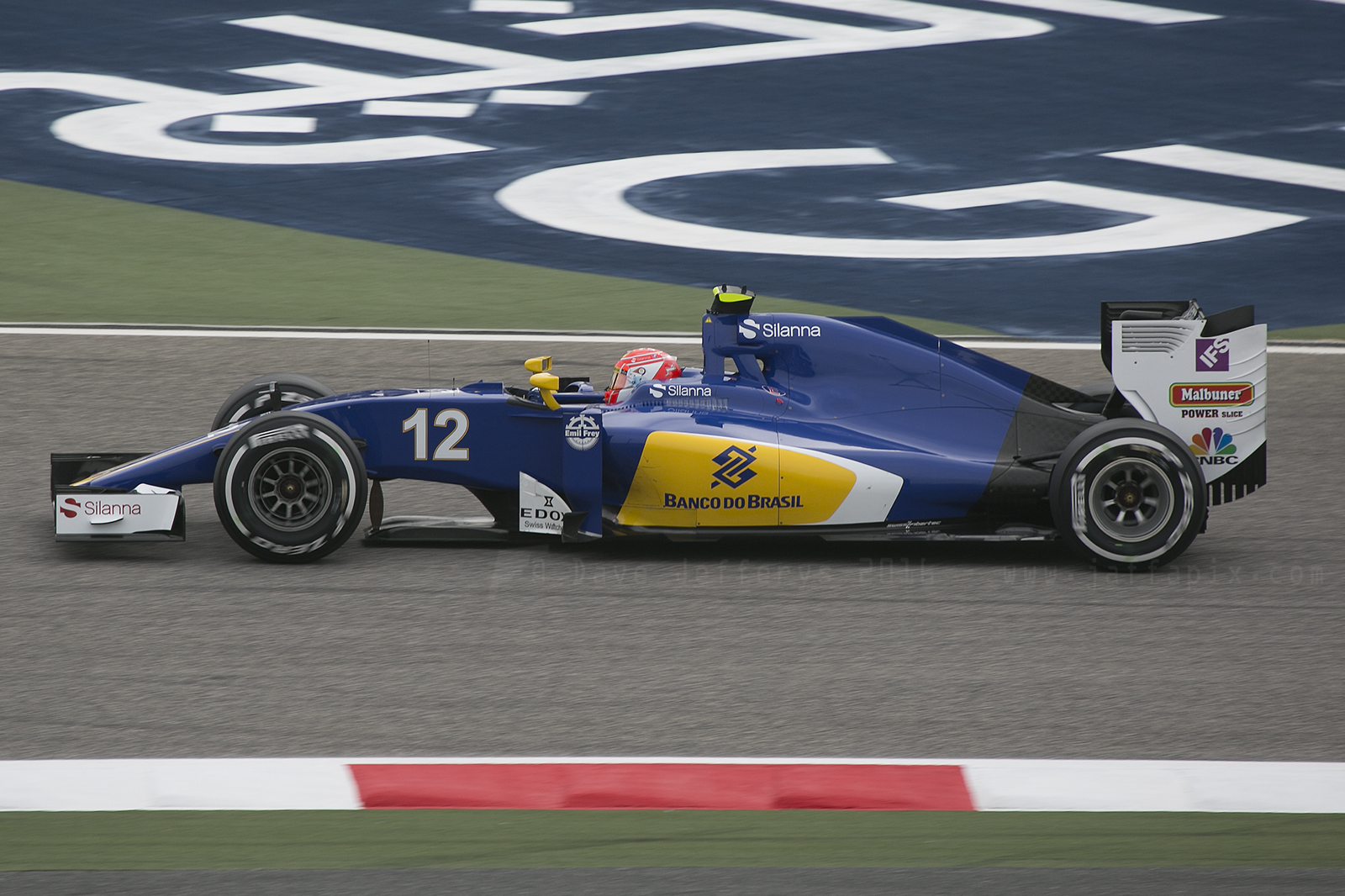
Felipe Nasr driving for Sauber at the 2016 Bahrain Grand Prix

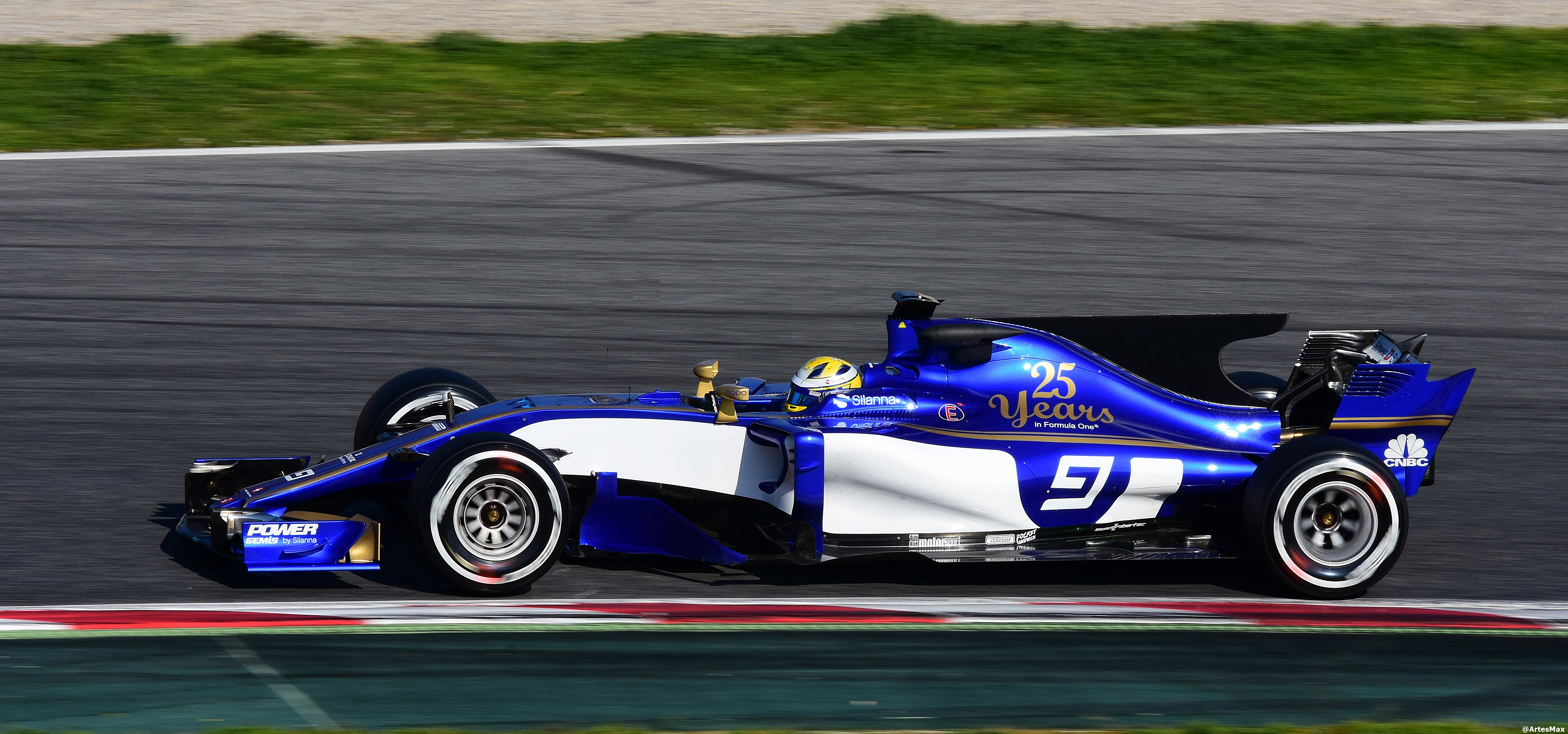
The Sauber C36 driven by Marcus Ericsson

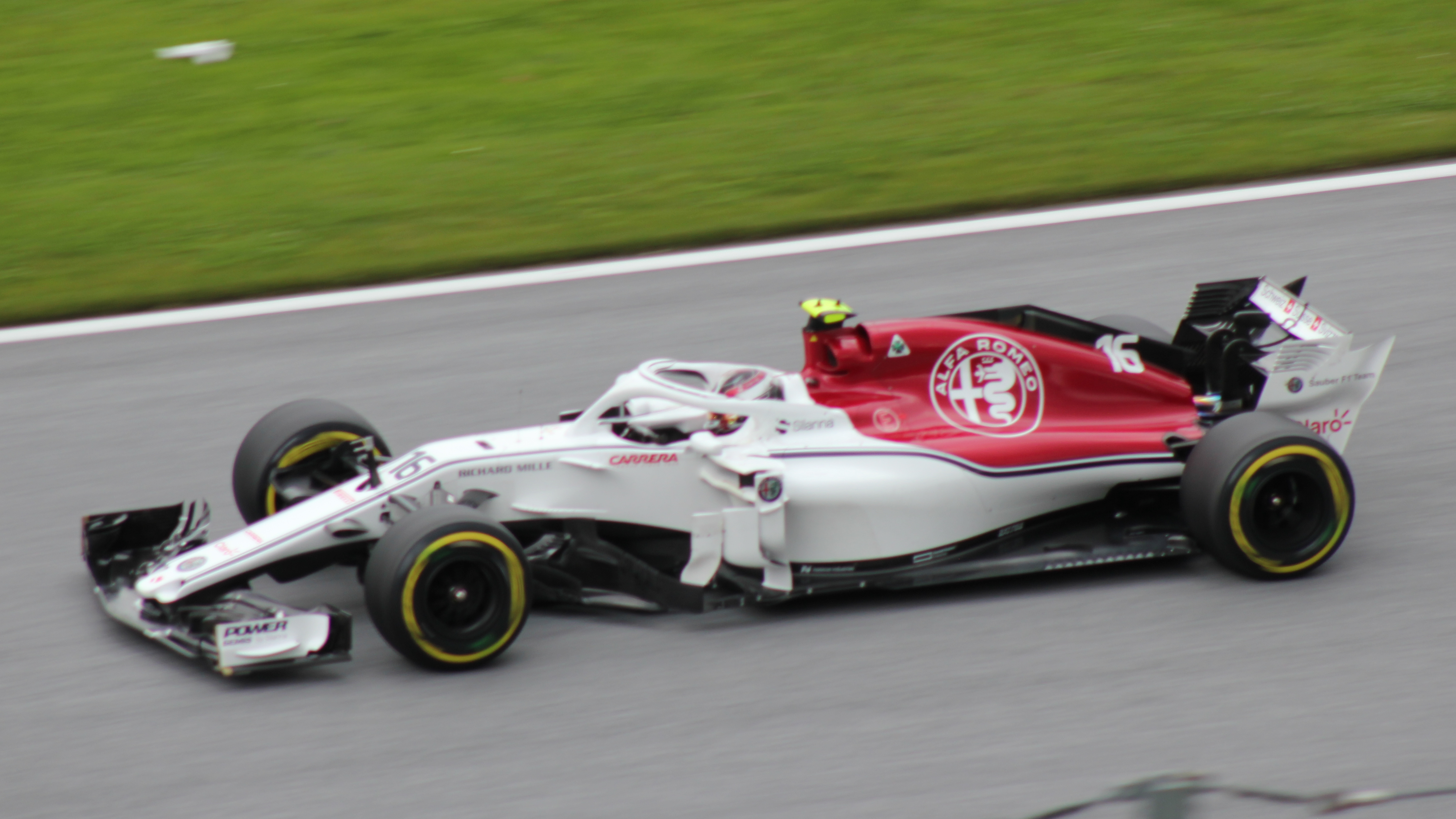
Charles Leclerc driving the Sauber C37 at the 2018 Austrian Grand Prix.

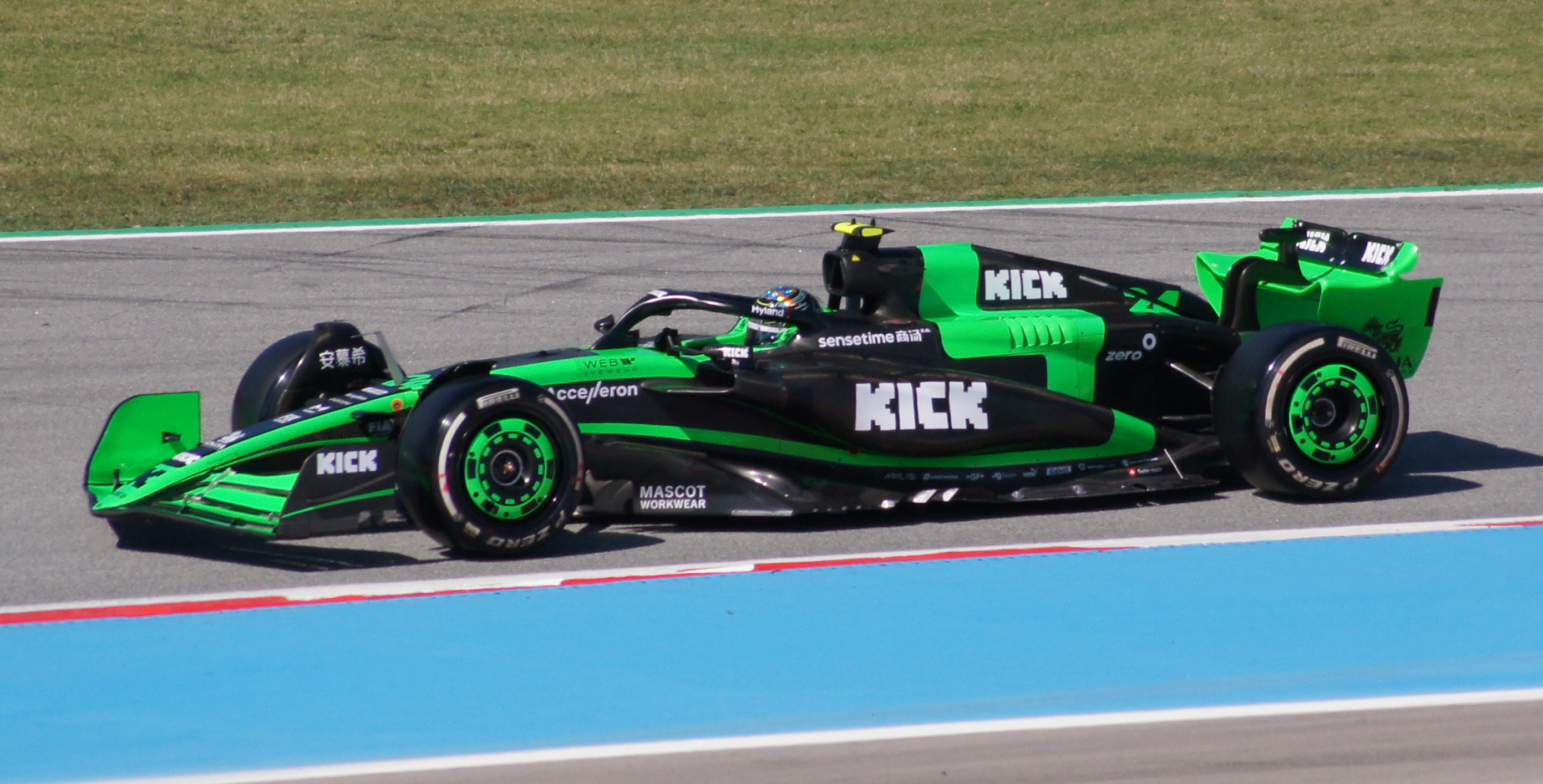
Zhou Guanyu driving the Kick Sauber C44 at the 2024 Spanish Grand Prix.

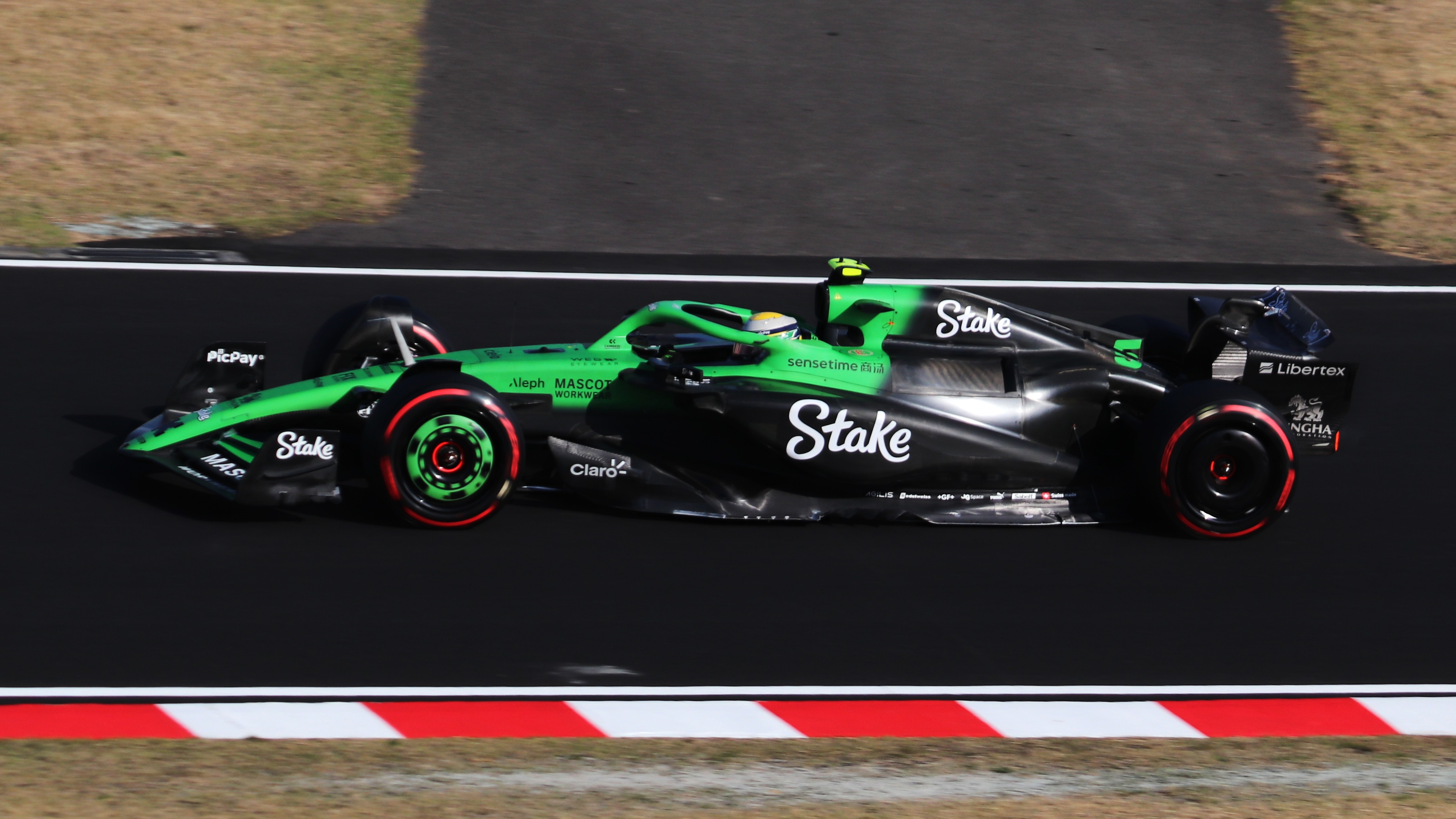
Gabriel Bortoleto driving the Kick Sauber C45 at the 2025 Japanese Grand Prix.

== Scirocco ==
Year	Main colour(s)	Additional colour(s)	Main sponsor(s)	Additional major sponsor(s)	Notes
1963	White	Blue, Red	Scirocco		
1964	White	Yellow			

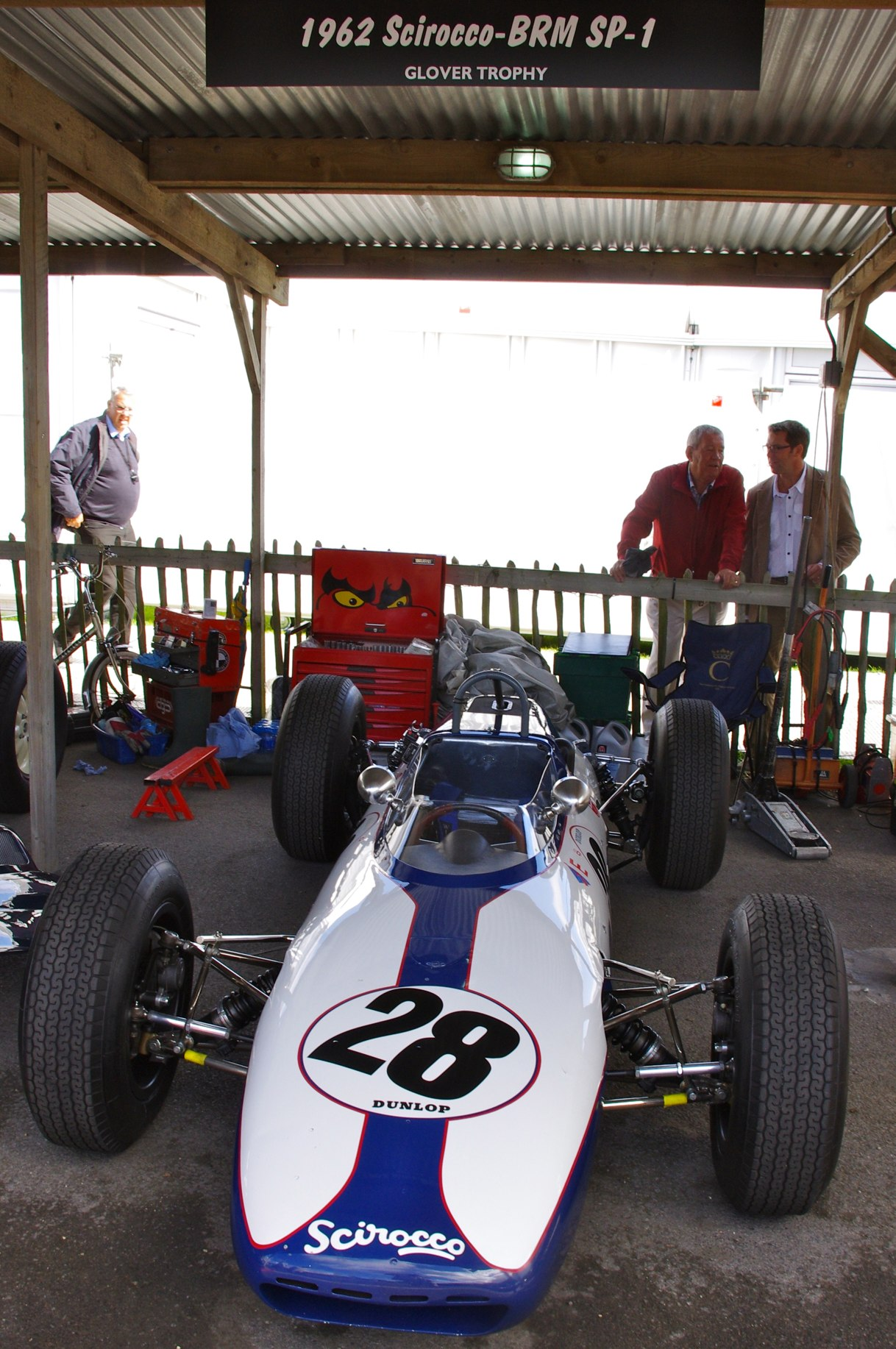
A Scirocco SP in its white, blue and red livery.

== Shadow ==
Year	Main colour(s)	Livery sponsor(s)	Additional major sponsor(s)	Notes
1973	Black	Universal Oil Products	Goodyear, Valvoline	A US flag as a mark of the team's nationality.
1974	Black	Universal Oil Products	Goodyear, Valvoline	A US flag as a mark of the team's nationality.
1975	Black	Universal Oil Products	Goodyear, Valvoline	A US flag as a mark of the team's nationality.
1976	Black	BiC (Brazilian Grand Prix only)	Goodyear, Valvoline F&S Properties (Dutch Grand Prix only)	A US flag as a mark of the team's origin (until the 1976 British GP).
1976	Black	Lucky Strike (South African Grand Prix only)	Goodyear, Valvoline F&S Properties (Dutch Grand Prix only)	A US flag as a mark of the team's origin (until the 1976 British GP).
1976	Black	Tabatip (German Grand Prix, Austrian Grand Prix, Dutch Grand Prix and Italian Grand Prix only)	Goodyear, Valvoline F&S Properties (Dutch Grand Prix only)	A US flag as a mark of the team's origin (until the 1976 British GP).
1976	Black	Benihana (Japanese Grand Prix only)	Goodyear, Valvoline F&S Properties (Dutch Grand Prix only)	A US flag as a mark of the team's origin (until the 1976 British GP).
1977	Black or White	Ambrosio, Tabatip and/or Villiger-Kiel (from Spanish Grand Prix onwards)	Achilli Motors, Elf, FINA, Lloyd Centauro, Shell	
1978	White, Red	Villiger-Kiel	FINA, Tabatip, Valvoline	
1979	White, Blue	Samson Shag (Jan Lammers)		
1979	Black	Staroup Jeans (Elio de Angelis; Brazilian Grand Prix only)	Guida Monaci, Tommaso Barbi, Valvoline, Villiger-Kiel	
1980	Black	Interlekt	AGA, Aguilar Oil, Group Waterworks, Valvoline, Villiger-Kiel	
1980	White	Theodore, Interlekt	Goodyear, Valvoline, Koni, Champion	

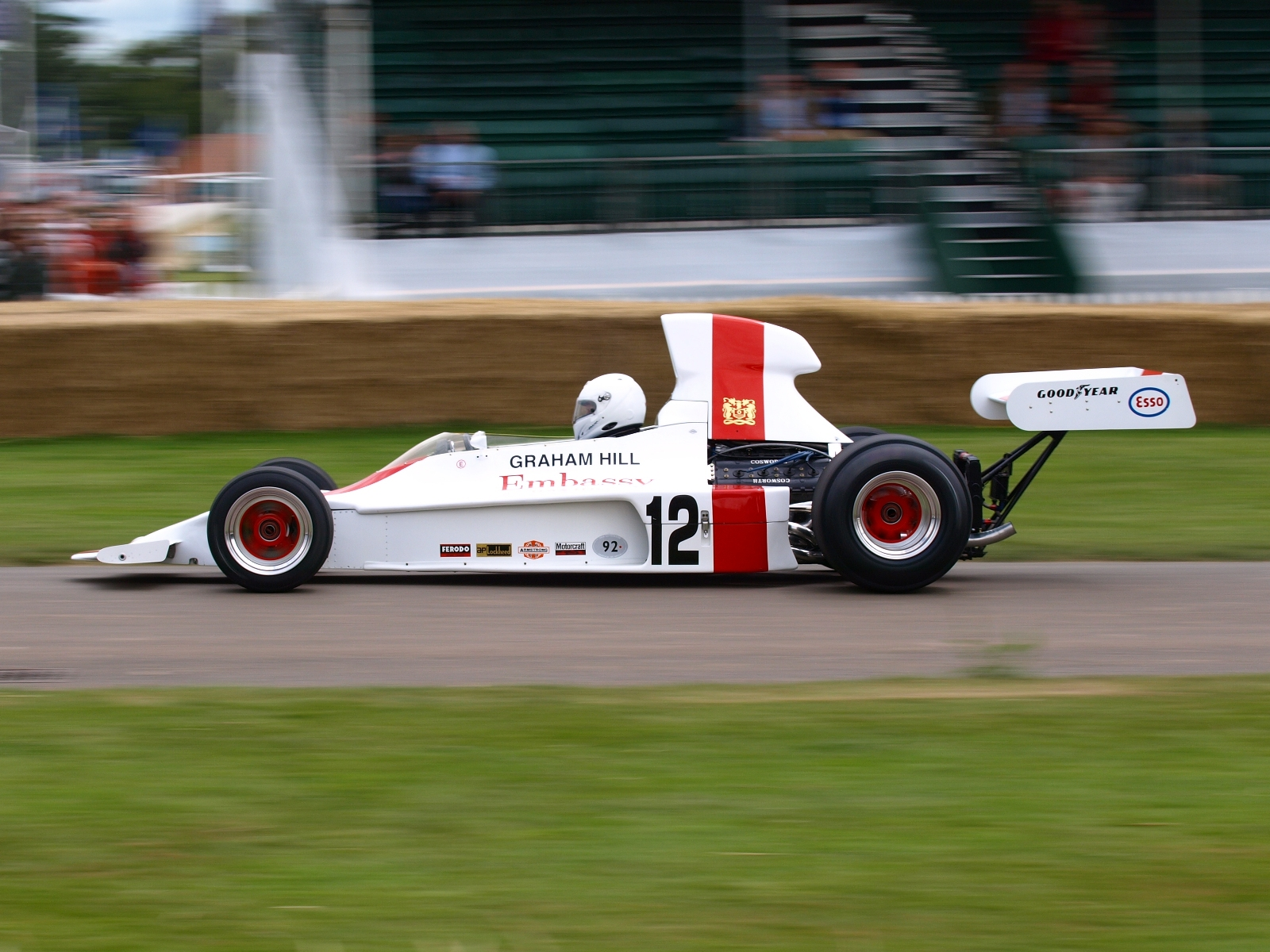
Hill's Embassy-liveried Shadow DN1 being tested at Goodwood

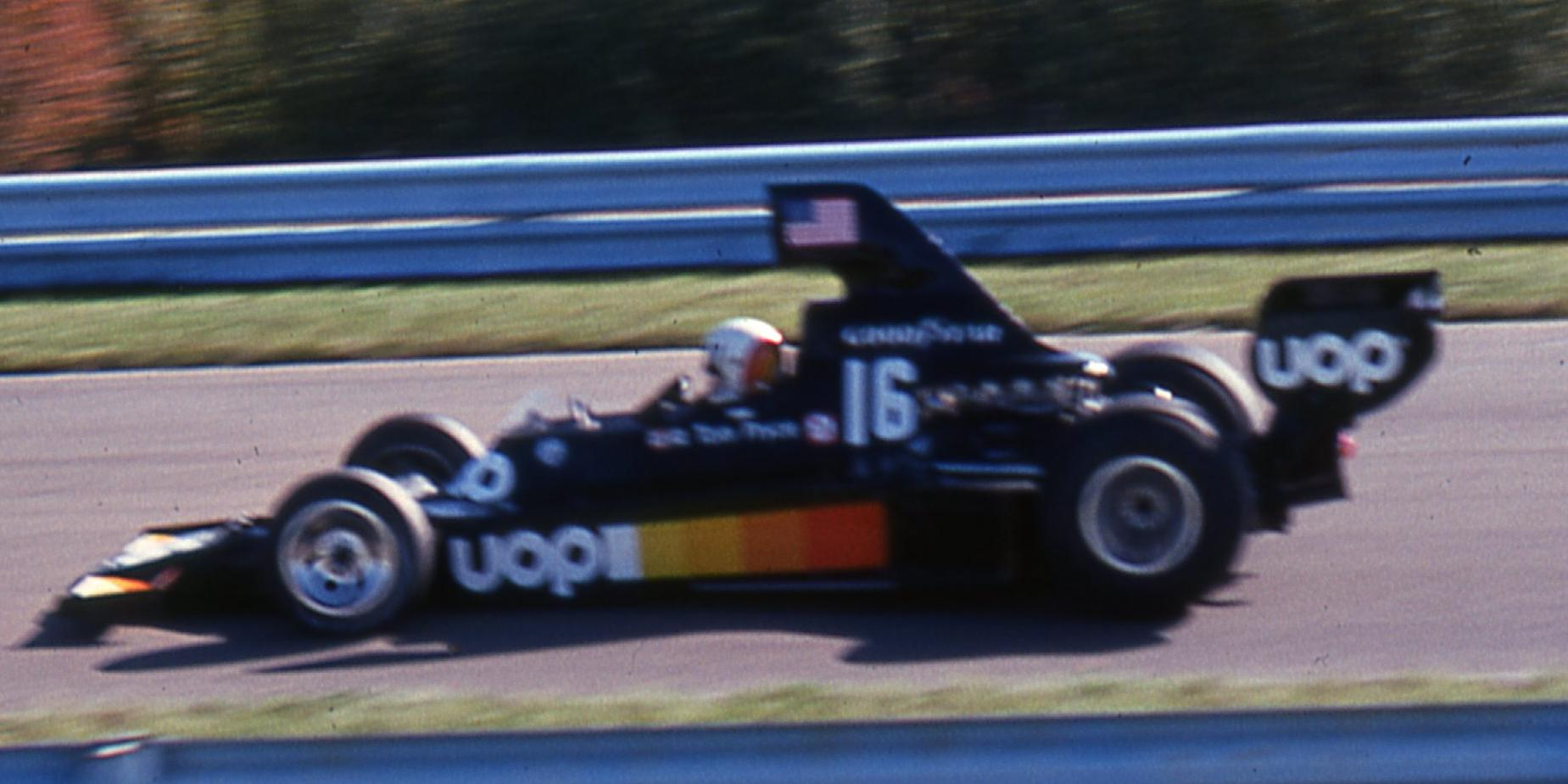
Tom Pryce driving for Shadow at Watkins Glen in 1975

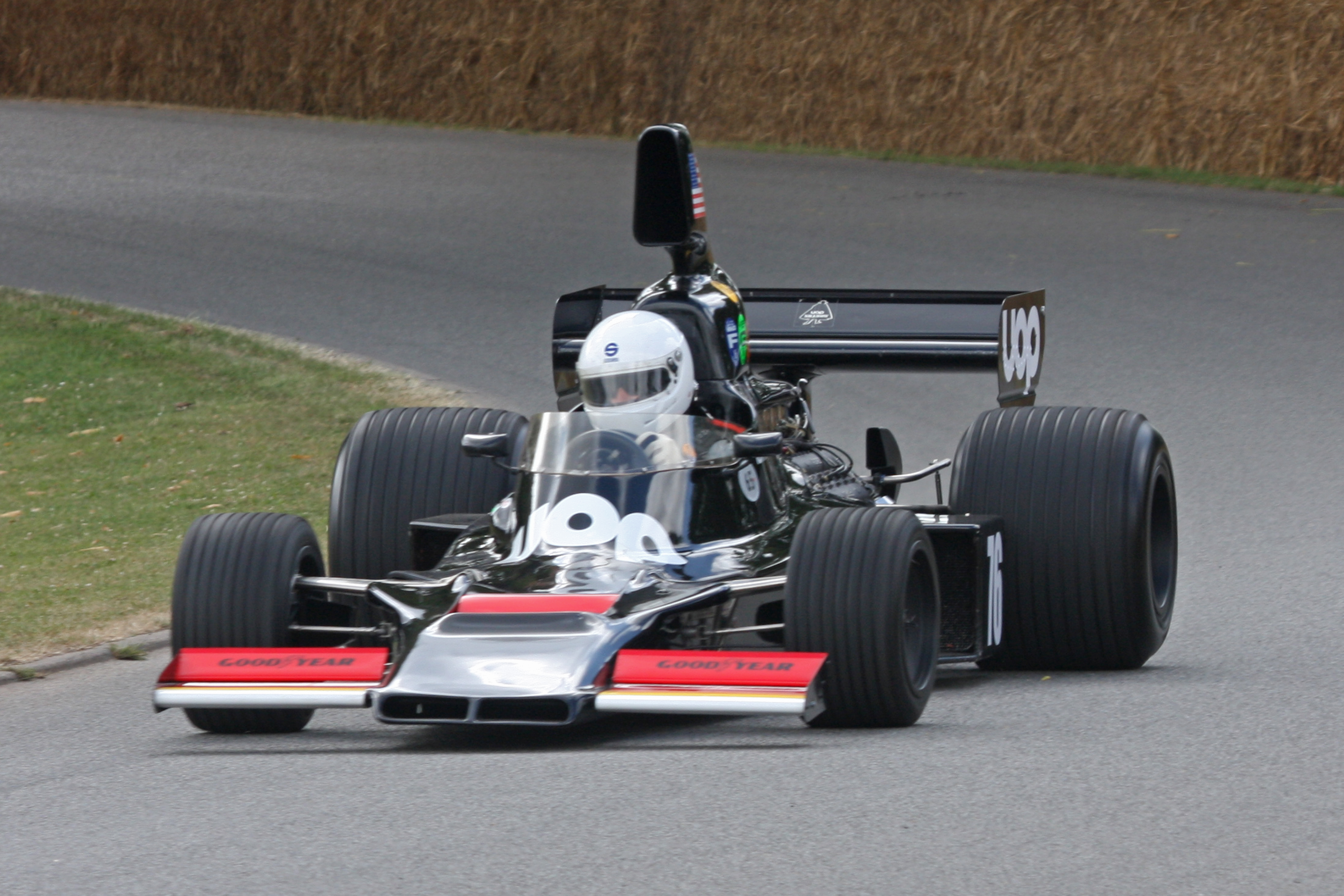
A Shadow DN5 in its black UOP Livery

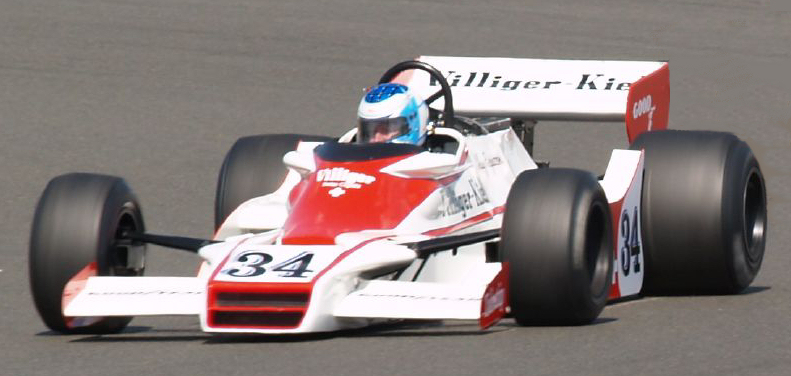
Clay Regazzoni's Shadow DN9 in its Villiger livery being demonstrated

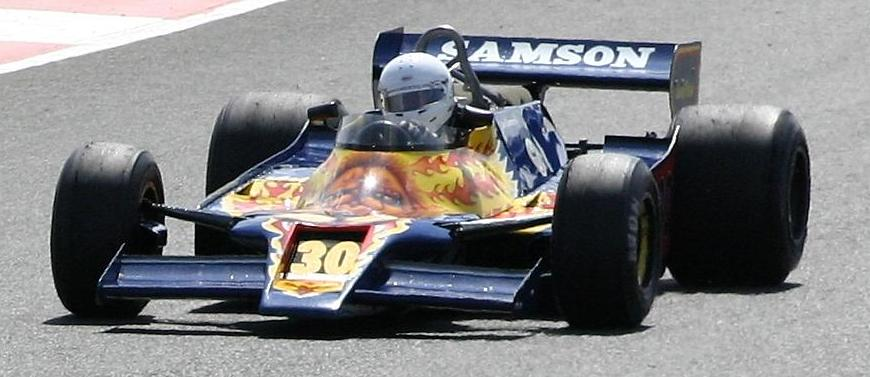
Jan Lammers's 1979 Shadow DN9 in its Burning Lion livery

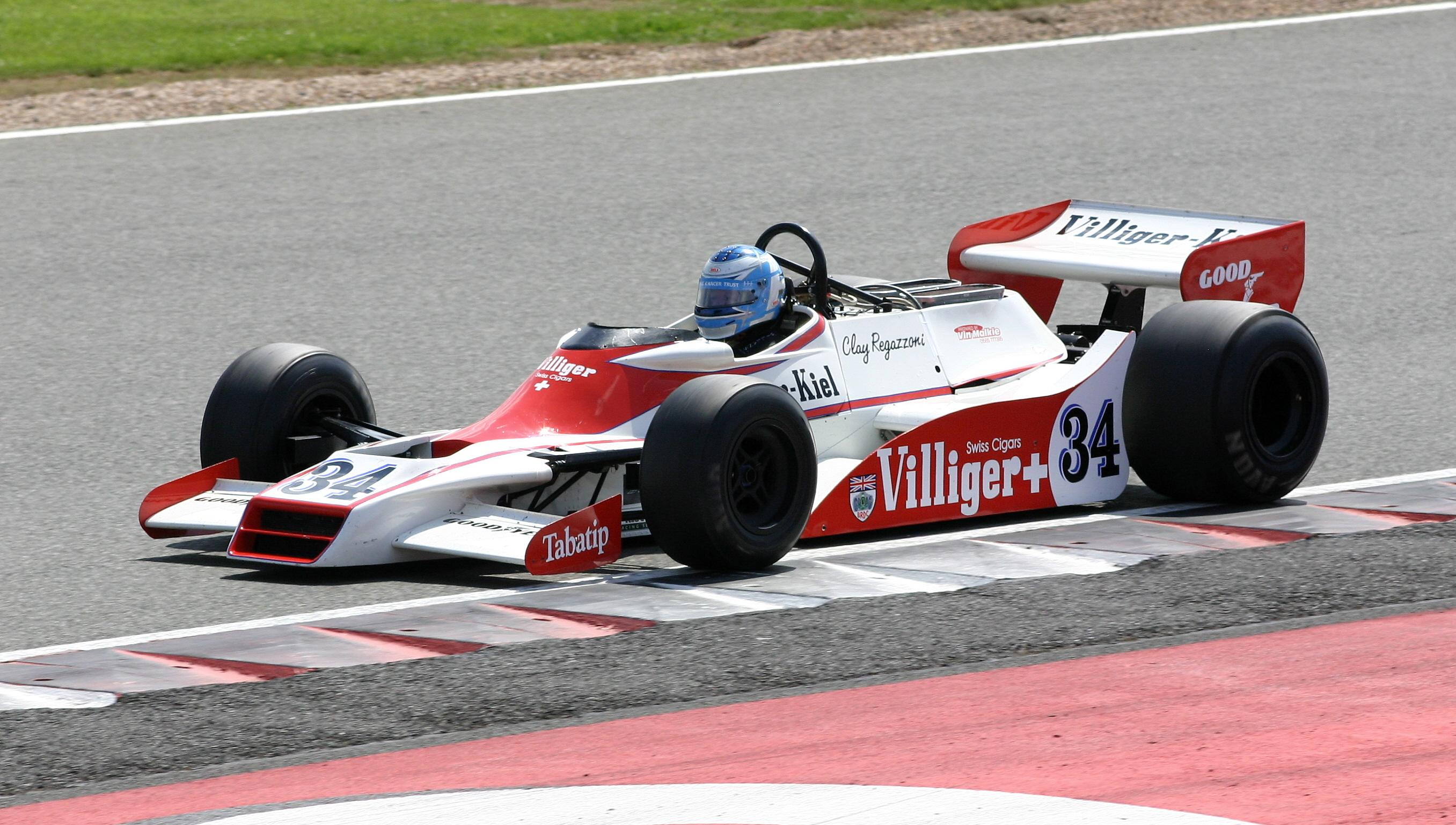
Clay Regazzoni's Shadow DN9 with a Villiger livery

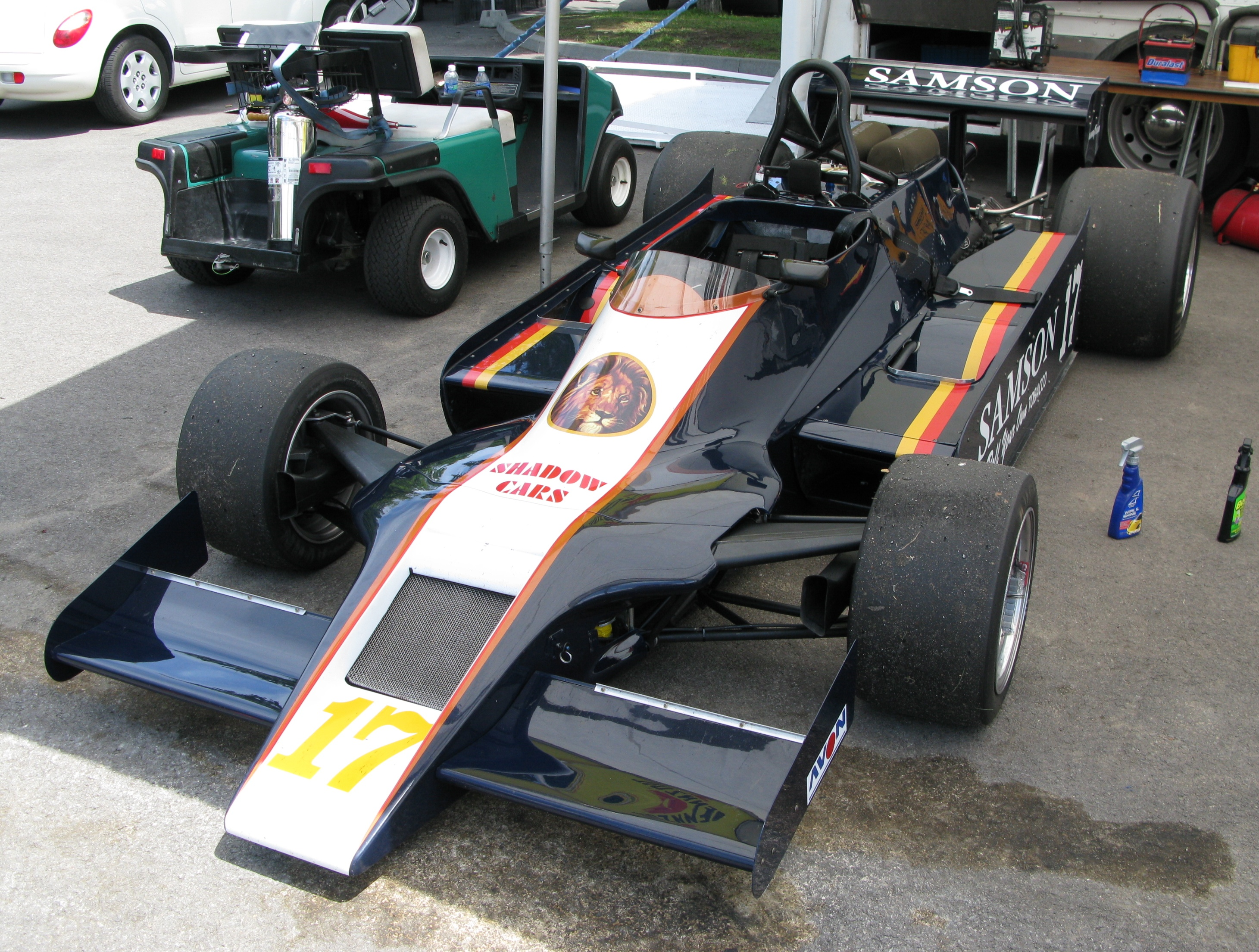
A Shadow DN9 with its Samson livery

== Simtek ==
Year	Main colour(s)	Additional colour(s)	Livery sponsor(s)	Additional major sponsor(s)	Notes
1994–1995	Purple	Red, Black, Blue	MTV Europe, Barbara MC (after 1994 San Marino Grand Prix), XTC	Russell Athletic, Ford, Würth, Goodyear, Vernilux, Korean Air, Fogo de Chao (in some GPs), COX Sport Shoes, Paul Mitchell, Men's Tenoras, Marutama Foods, Time-Sert	After Ratzenberger's death, an Austrian flag with "For Roland" text was displayed on the airbox.

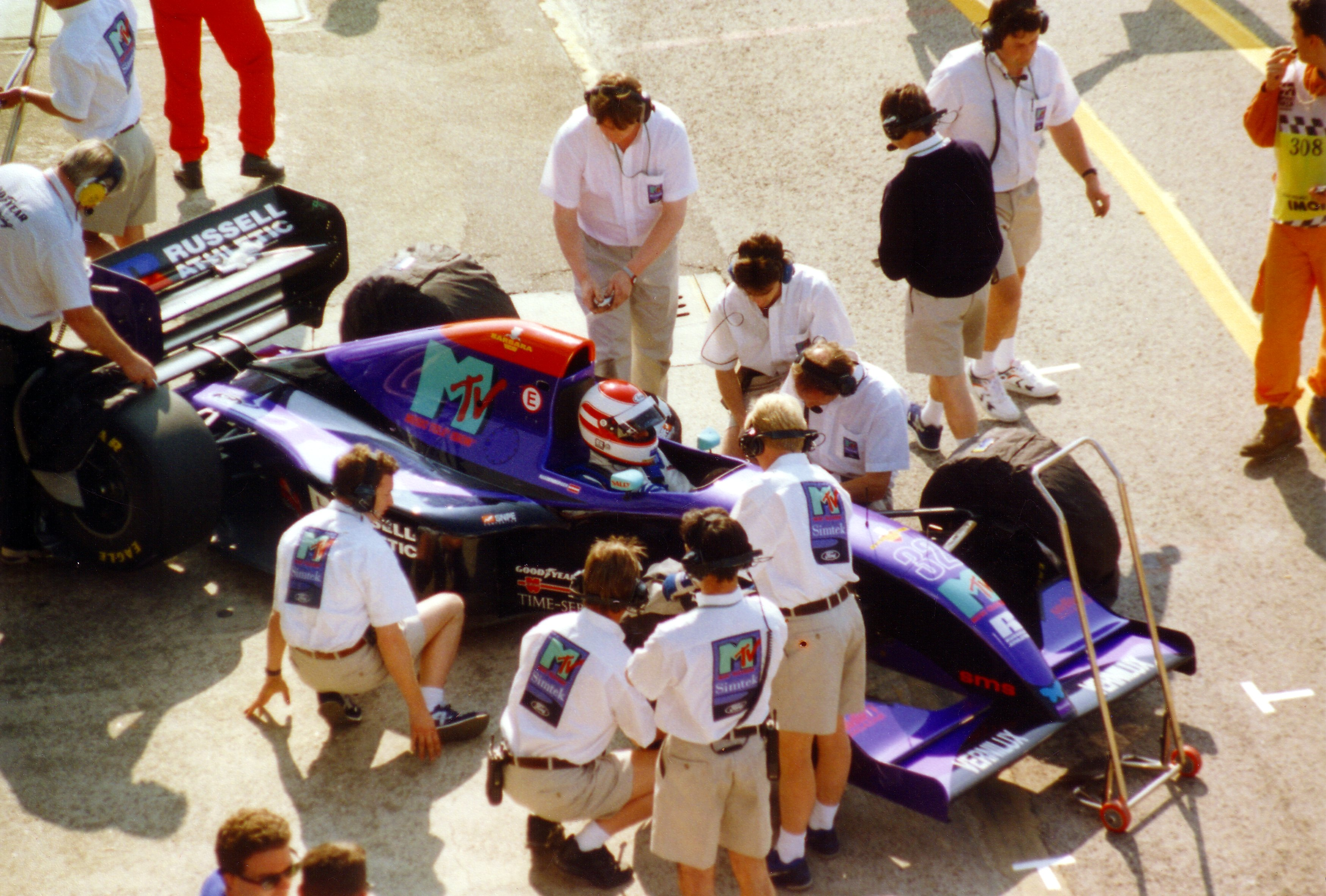
Roland Ratzenberger's Simtek at the 1994 San Marino Grand Prix.

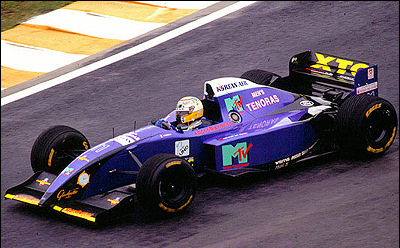
In 1995, Simtek gained support from the Energy Drink XTC and Men's Tenoras, a Japanese men fashion brand that was Hideki Noda's sponsor in F3000. This is Domenico Schiattarella driving his S951 in 1995.

== Spirit ==
Year	Main colour(s)	Additional colour(s)	Main sponsor(s)	Additional major sponsor(s)
1983 (early livery)	White	Red, Blue, Black	Honda	Marlboro, NGK, Newsweek, Shell, +1
1983 (later livery)	Blue	Red, White, Black	Honda, Virginiana, Kelemata	Marlboro, NGK, Newsweek, Shell, +1, SYDEXPO
1984 (early livery)	White	Black	Sport Goofy, Panasonic, Momo, Majestic	STP, Bburago, Topolino, Pirelli
1984 (later livery)	Red	Black, White	Sport Goofy, Panasonic, Momo, Marlboro,	STP, Bburago, Pirelli
1985 (early livery)	White	Black	Elledi Wafers, Australian	Coopbox, Pirelli, Honda
1985 (later livery)	Blue	Red, Blue, White	Australian, Elledi Wafers	Rombo, Pirelli, Coopbox, Nikon, Honda

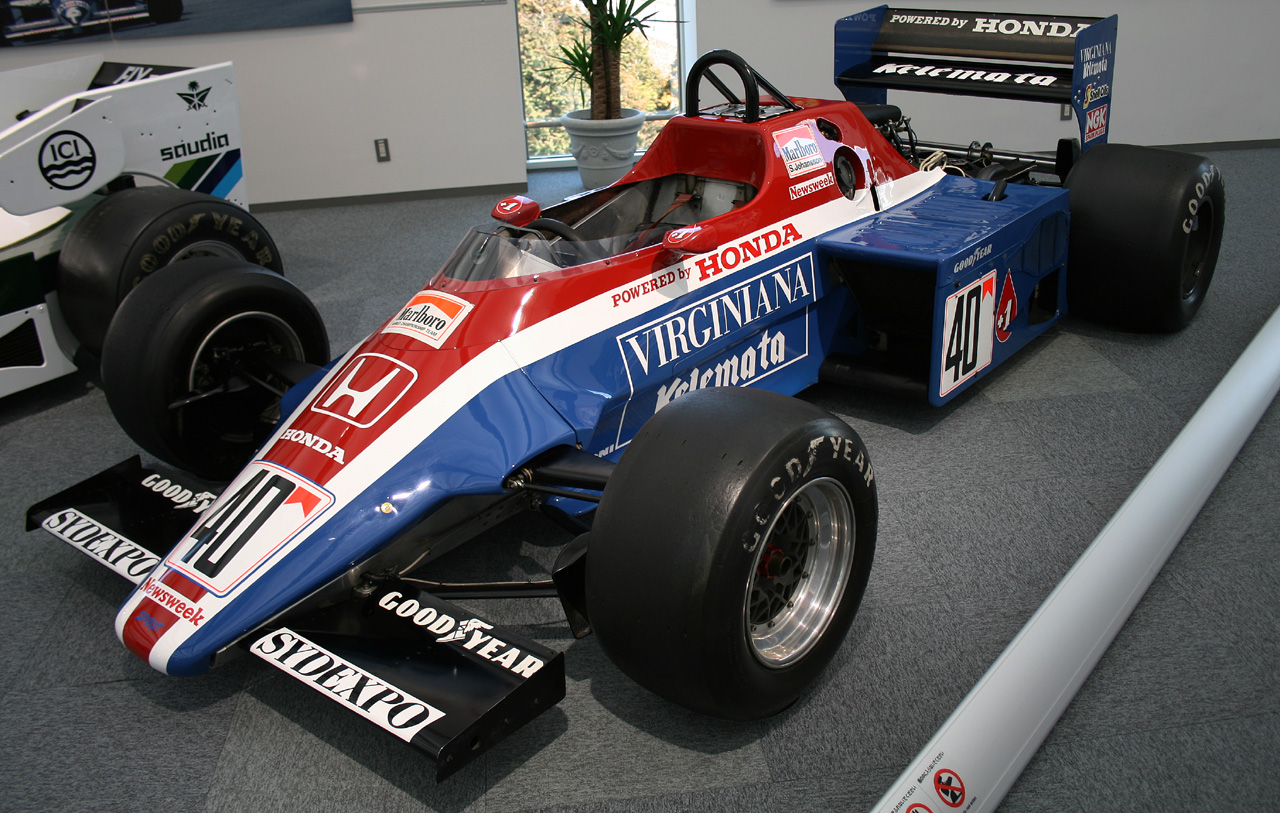
Spirit's first Formula One chassis, the Spirit 201C.

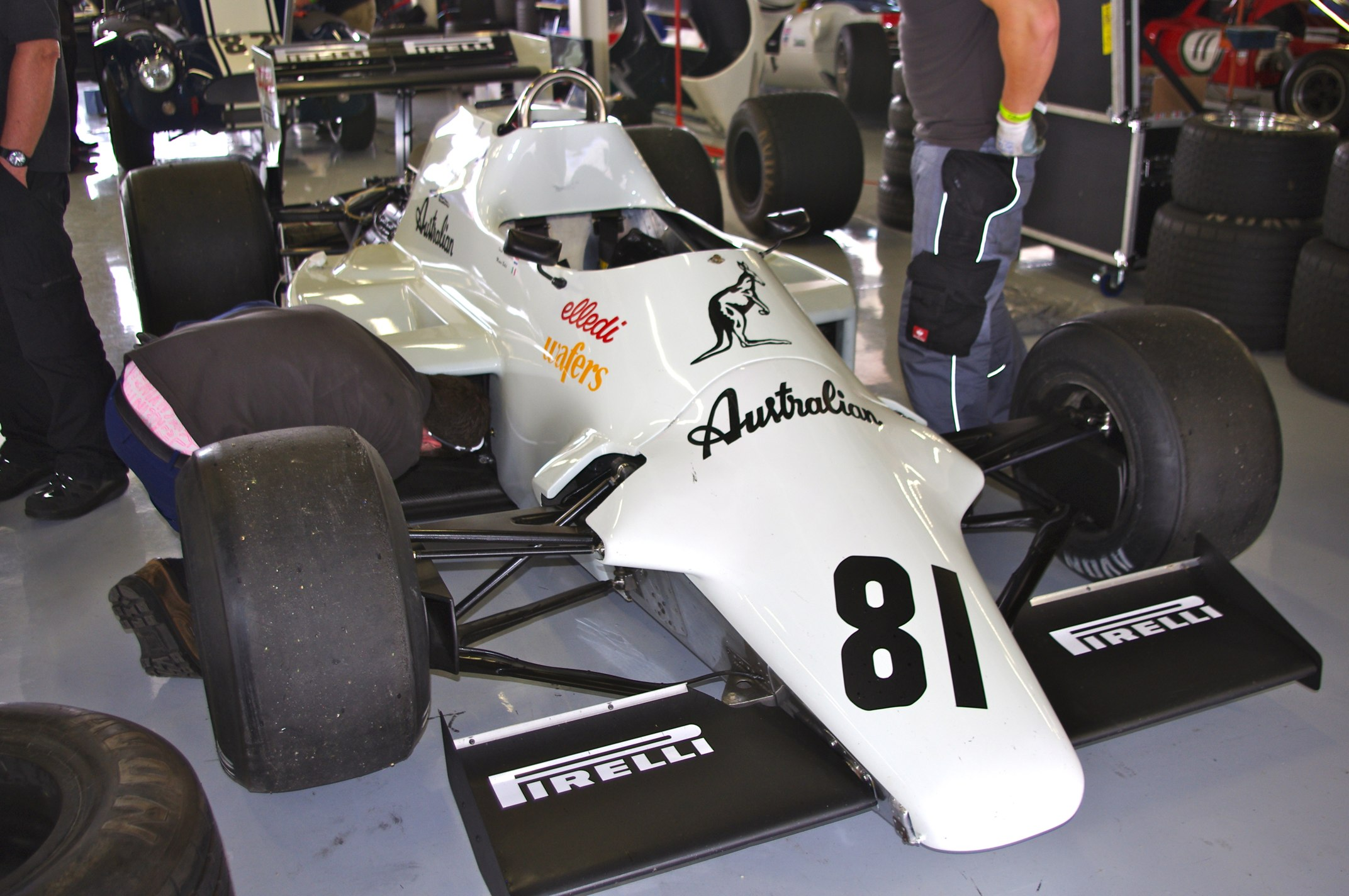
The Spirit 101 from 1984 season at Silverstone

== Spyker ==
Spyker took part in only one season of Formula One. The main colour of the car did not directly reflect the sponsorships but was the orange racing colour of the Netherlands.

Year	Main colour(s)	Additional colour(s)	Main sponsor(s)	Additional major sponsor(s)
2007	Orange	Grey	Etihad, Aldar Abu Dhabi	Superfund, Medion, Rhino's, MAN, McGregor, Exact Software, Trust, Oikos, LeasePlan, Philoderm, Dremel, 1905.com, Magneti Marelli, Kemppi, Navteq, SHS, Weigl, Robor

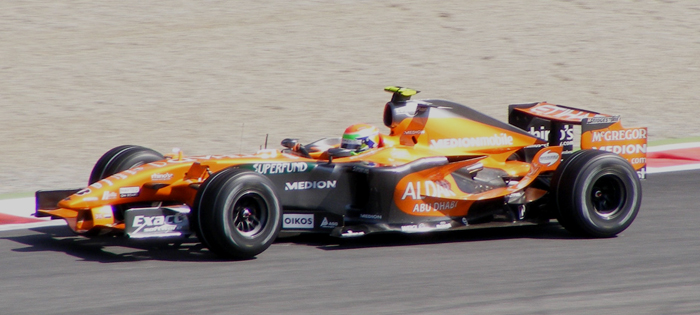
Sakon Yamamoto driving the Spyker F8-VII at Monza in 2007.

== Stewart ==
Stewart lasted for only 3 years before being bought out by its engine supplier, Ford, and being rebranded as Jaguar, but managed to win a race in its final season, 1999. Stewart had a tartan decoration on its cars to represent its Scottish nationality.

Year	Main colour(s)	Additional colour(s)	Main sponsor(s)	Additional major sponsor(s)
1997 to 1999	White	Blue and Yellow-Green tartan	Ford, HSBC (1999)	Texaco, Lear, Visit Malaysia, MCI WorldCom, HP, Visteon

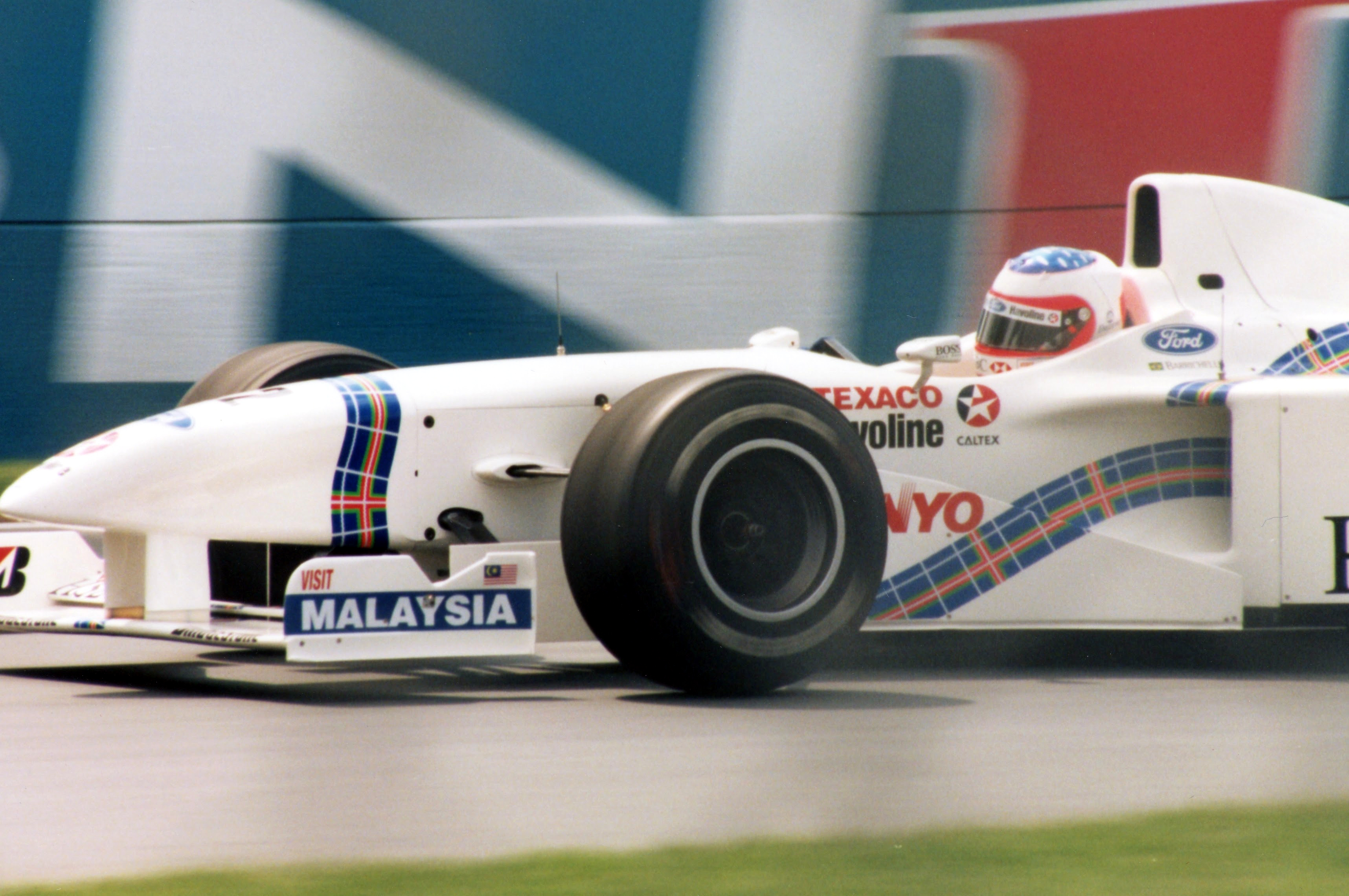
Rubens Barrichello driving the Stewart SF-2 at the 1998 Canadian Grand Prix.

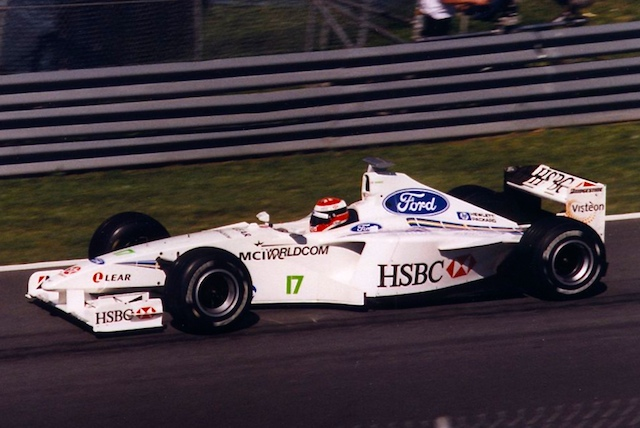
Johnny Herbert driving for Stewart at Montreal in 1999

== Super Aguri ==
Super Aguri was set up before the 2006 season by Aguri Suzuki, with the help of Honda Racing, to provide a drive for former Honda driver Takuma Sato. For the 2006 season's SA05 and SA06, their car was based on the 2002 Arrows A23, after which, for the 2007 and 2008 seasons, they ran cars based on the previous year's Honda chassis.

Year	Main colour(s)	Additional colour(s)	Main sponsor(s)	Additional major sponsor(s)
2006	White	Red	None	Samantha Kingz, Honda, Bridgestone
2007	White, Red		None	Samantha Kingz, Honda, Bridgestone, S.S. United, Four Leaf, Pioneer, Autobacs Seven
2008	White, Red	Black	None	Samantha Kingz, Honda, Bridgestone, S.S. United, Speakerbus, Autobacs Seven

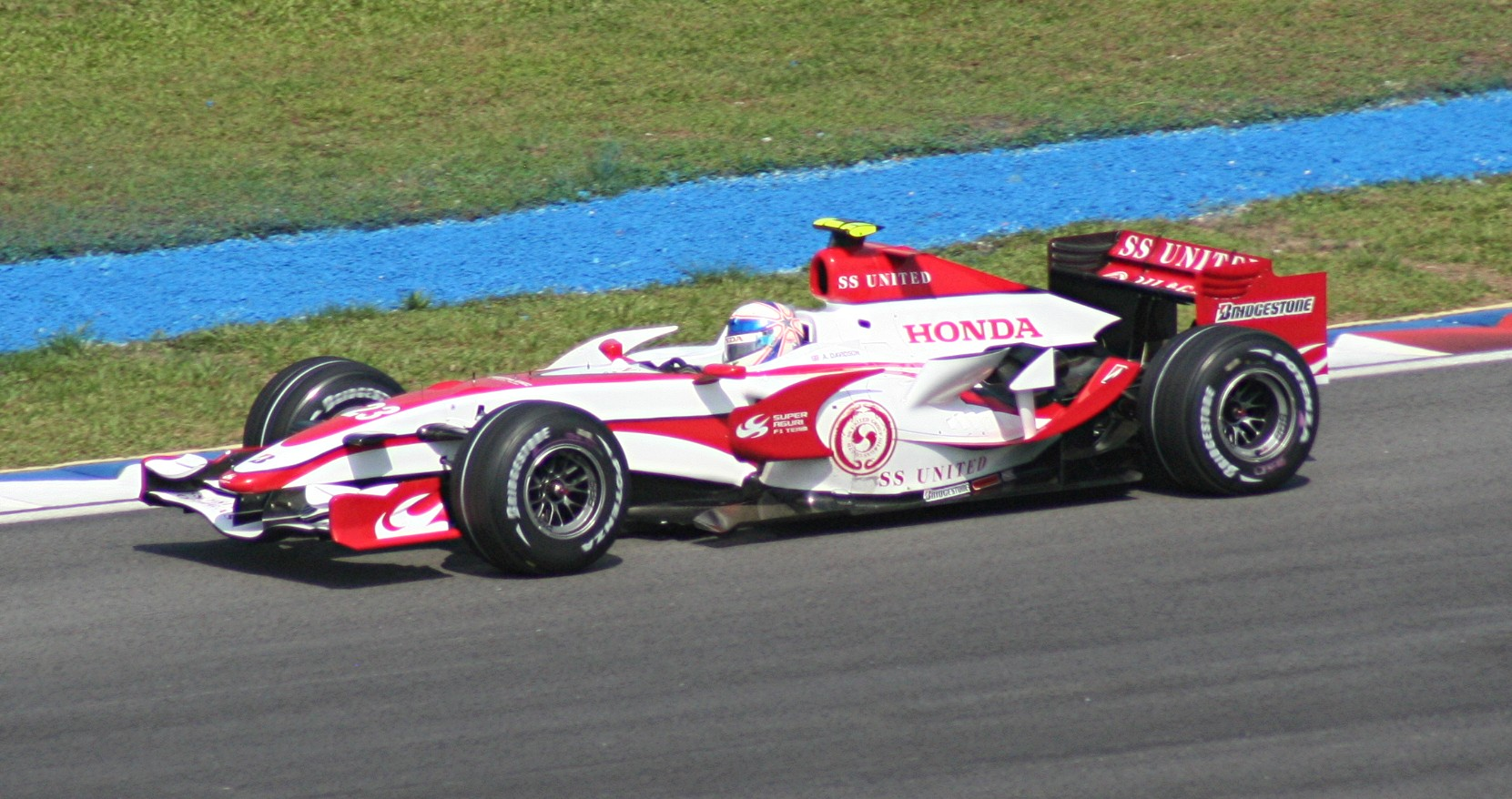
Anthony Davidson driving the Super Aguri SA07, based on the Honda RA106, at the 2007 Malaysian Grand Prix.

== Surtees ==
Year	Driver(s)	Main colour(s)	Main sponsor(s)	Additional major sponsor(s)
1970	John Surtees; Derek Bell	Red		BP, Ferodo, Autolite
1971	John Surtees; Brian Redman; Mike Hailwood	Blue	Brooke Bond Oxo, Rob Walker	BP, Firestone, Ford
1971	Derek Bell	Blue	Hago	BP, Firestone, Ford
1971	Rolf Stommelen; Gijs van Lennep; Sam Posey	Blue	Auto Motor und Sport, Eifelland	FINA, Firestone, Ford
1972	Andrea de Adamich	Red	Ceramica Pagnossin	
1972	Mike Hailwood	Blue	Brooke Bond Oxo, Rob Walker	Duckhams Matchbox (South African Grand Prix only)
1972	Tim Schenken	Blue	Brooke Bond Oxo, Rob Walker	Duckhams Matchbox (South African Grand Prix only)
1972	Tim Schenken	Red	Flame Out	Duckhams Matchbox (South African Grand Prix only)
1972	John Surtees	Blue		Duckhams Matchbox (South African Grand Prix only)
1973	Andrea de Adamich	Red	Ceramica Pagnossin	
1973	Mike Hailwood	Blue	Brooke Bond Oxo, Rob Walker	FINA, Ford, Heuer
1973	Carlos Pace	Blue	Brooke Bond Oxo, Brasil Export	FINA, Ford, Heuer
1973	Jochen Mass	White	Autozeitung	FINA, MacDonald Fraser & Co Ltd.
1973	Luiz Bueno	White		
1974	Carlos Pace; Jochen Mass; Derek Bell; José Dolhem; Jean-Pierre Jabouille; Helmut Koinigg	White, Red	Bang & Olufsen, Matchbox, FINA	Ford, Heuer, Motorcraft, Brahma, Lonex, FreioFast
1974	Dieter Quester	White, Red	Memphis International, Matchbox, FINA	Iris Ceramica
1974	Jorge de Bagration	Orange, White, Green	El Corte Inglés, Matchbox, Empresa Nacional Calvo Sotelo	
1975	John Watson	Yellow, Blue	Matchbox	FINA
1975	Dave Morgan	Yellow, Blue	National Organs	FINA
1976	Brett Lunger; Conny Anderson	White	Chesterfield; Campari (German Grand Prix only)	FINA, Delaware Trust, Benrus, Valvoline
1976	Alan Jones	White	Durex; Theodore Racing Hong Kong (Japanese Grand Prix only)	FINA, Van Hool
1976	Noritake Takahara	White	Garage Italiya	Stanley Electric Co, Ltd.
1977	Hans Binder; Lamberto Leoni; Larry Perkins; Patrick Tambay; Vern Schuppan	White	Durex	Raiffeissen
1977	Vittorio Brambilla	Orange	Beta Utensili	FINA
1978	Rupert Keegan; Gimax; Beppe Gabbiani	Orange	Durex, British Air Ferries	FINA, Van Hool
1978	Vittorio Brambilla; René Arnoux	Orange	Beta Utensili	FINA

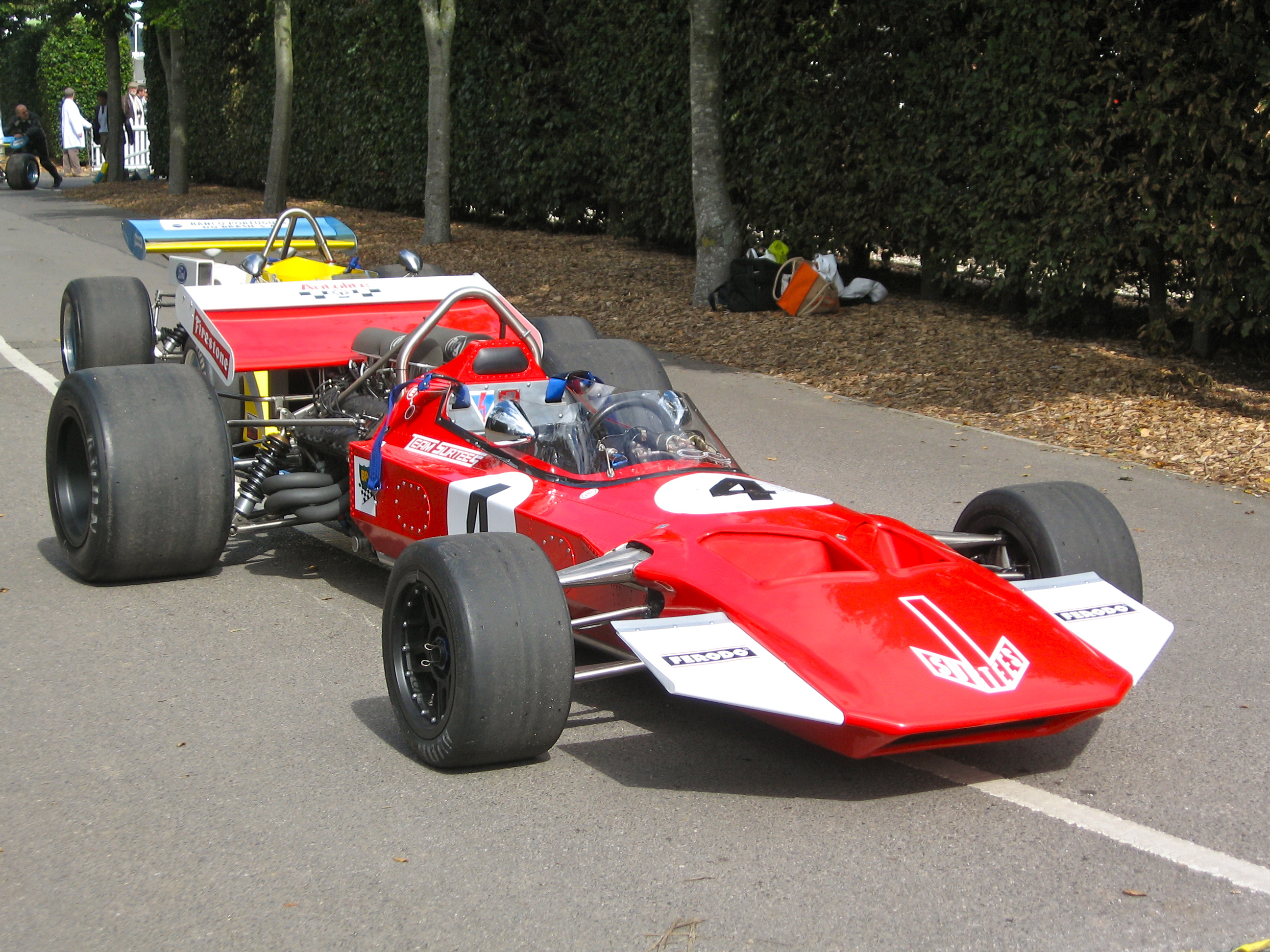
Initially Surtees raced with a red car with white accents

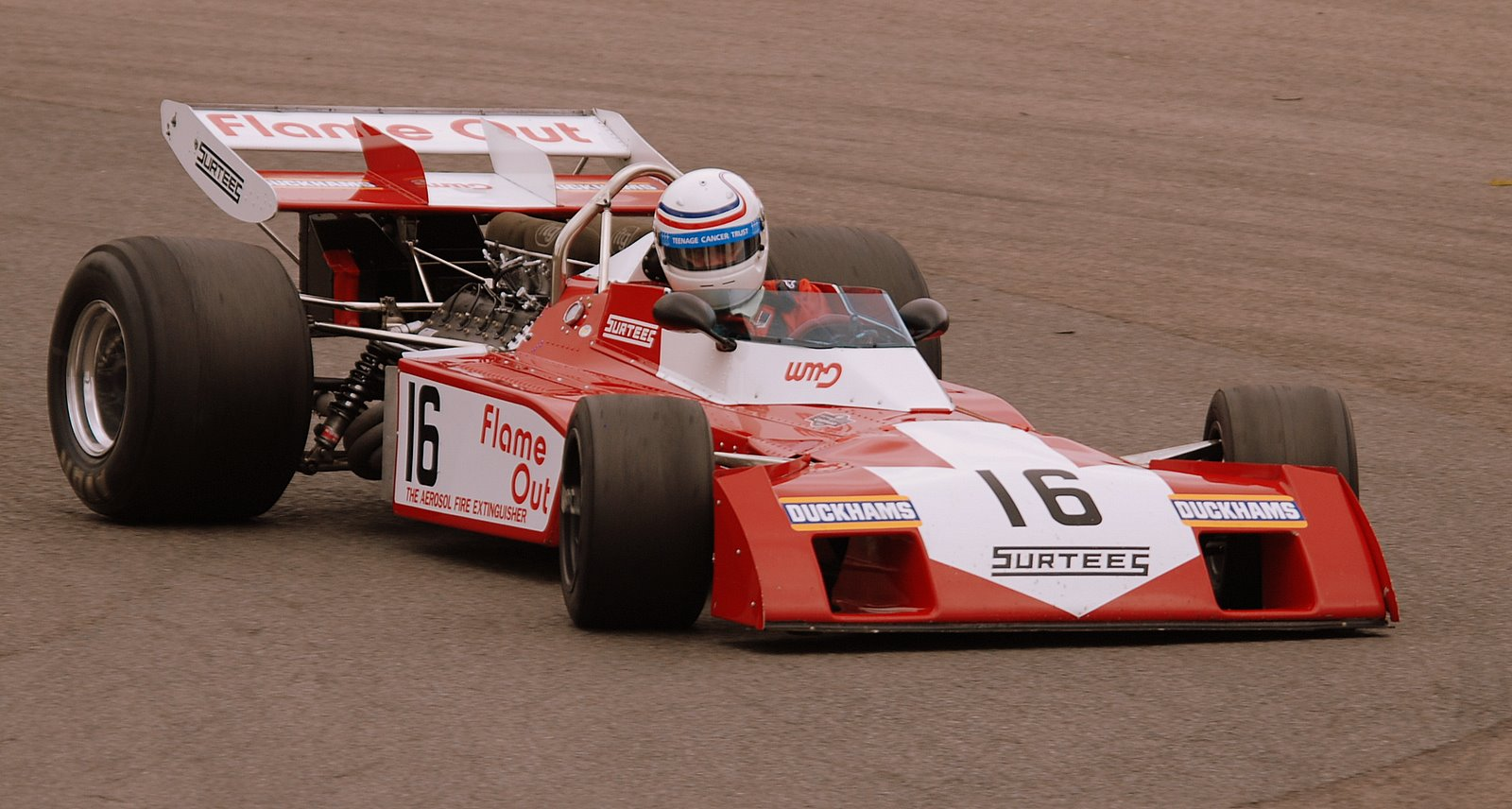
A Surtees TS9 from 1971 season, with its first sponsor on the livery.

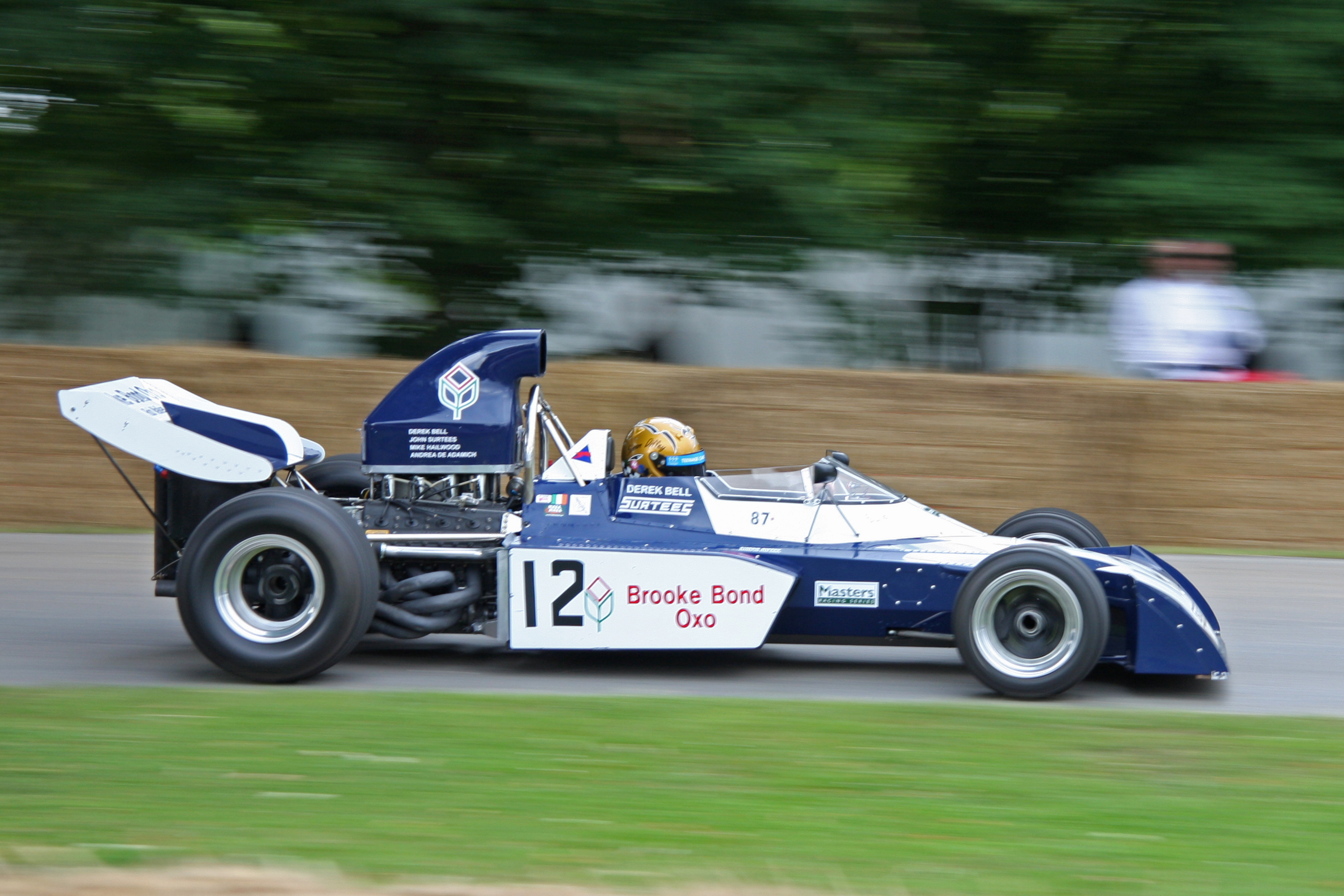
Later, Surtees changed from red to blue after gaining its first sponsor

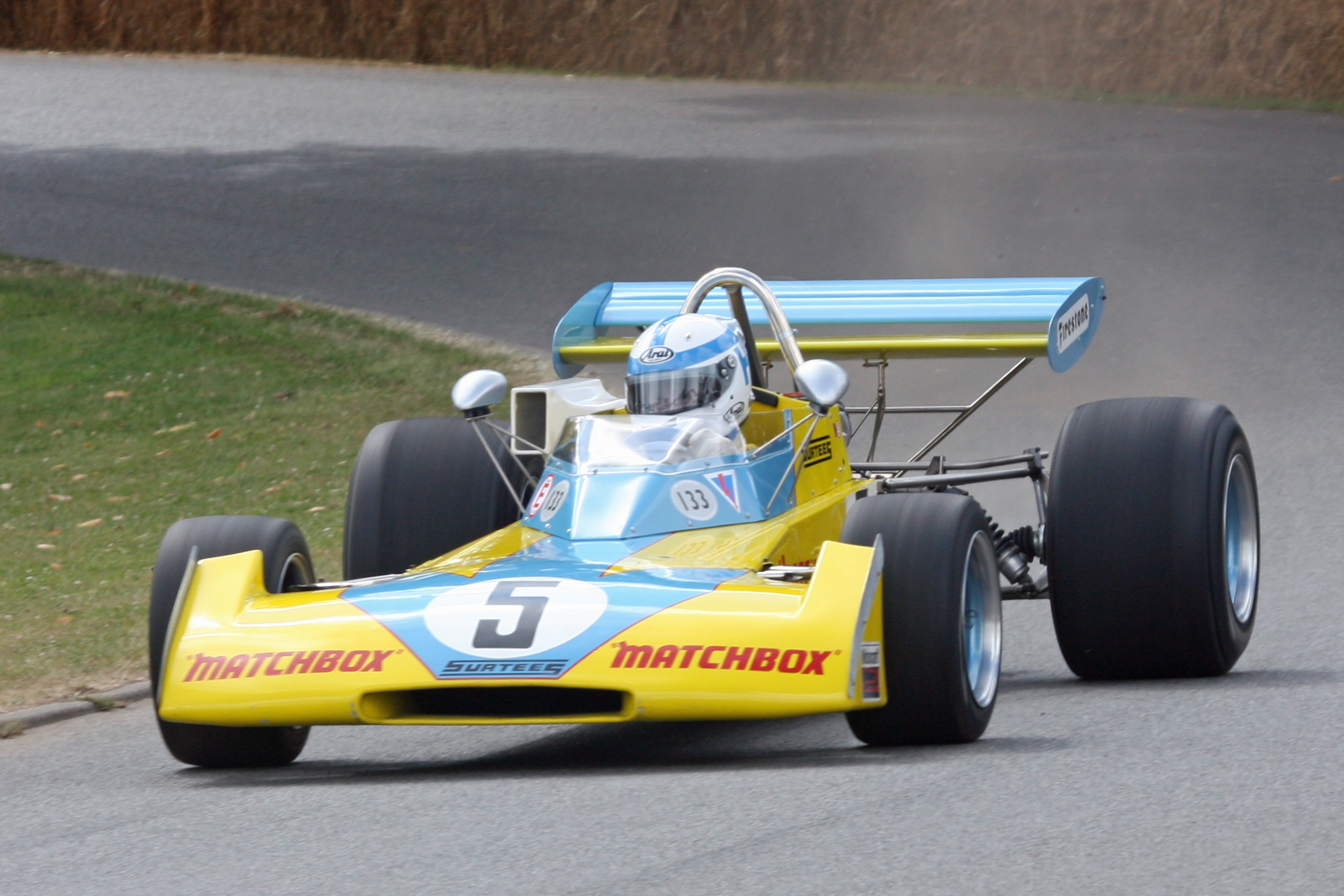
A Surtees in 1972 Matchbox livery

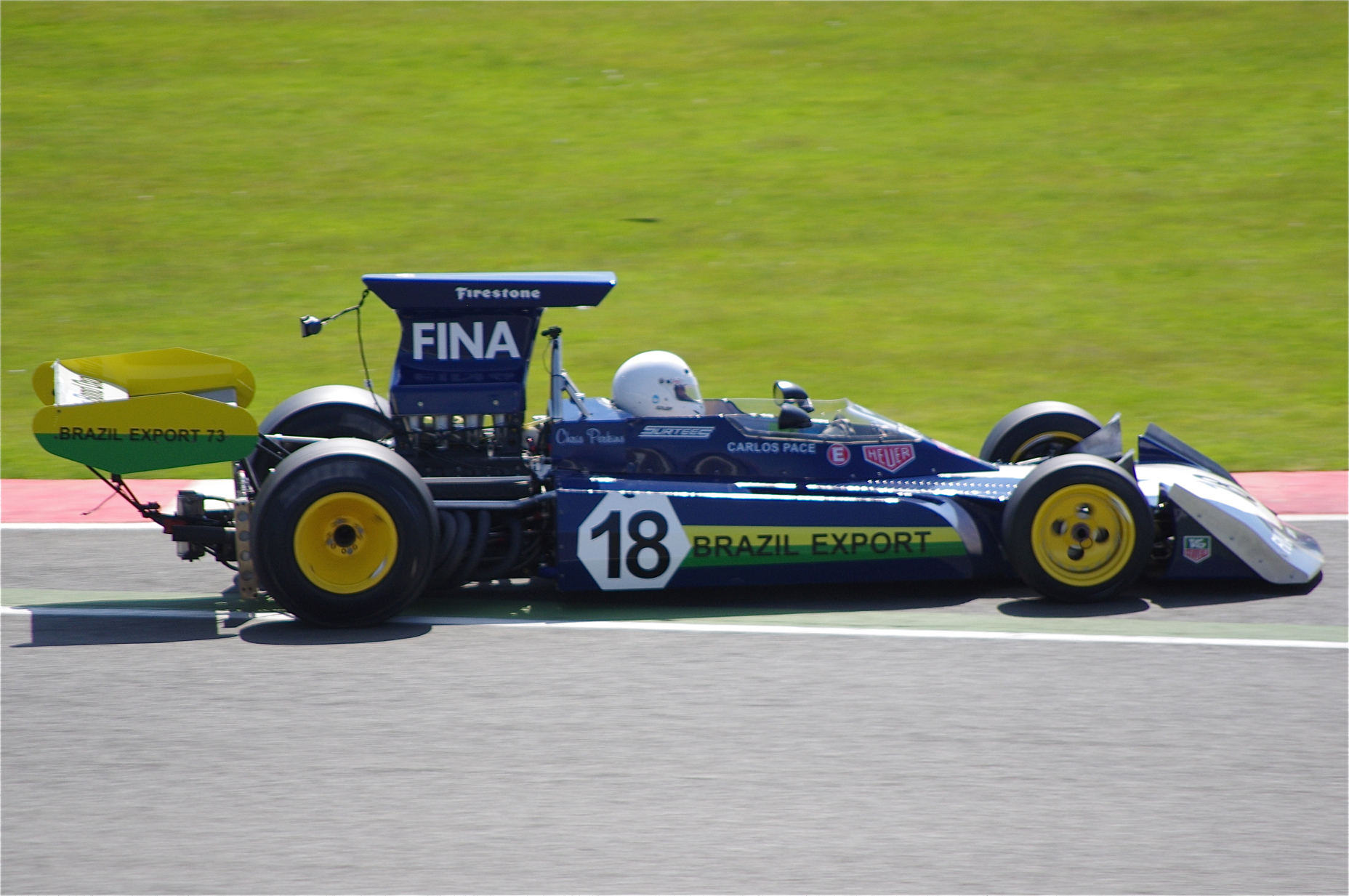
A Surtees in 1973 Brazil Export livery

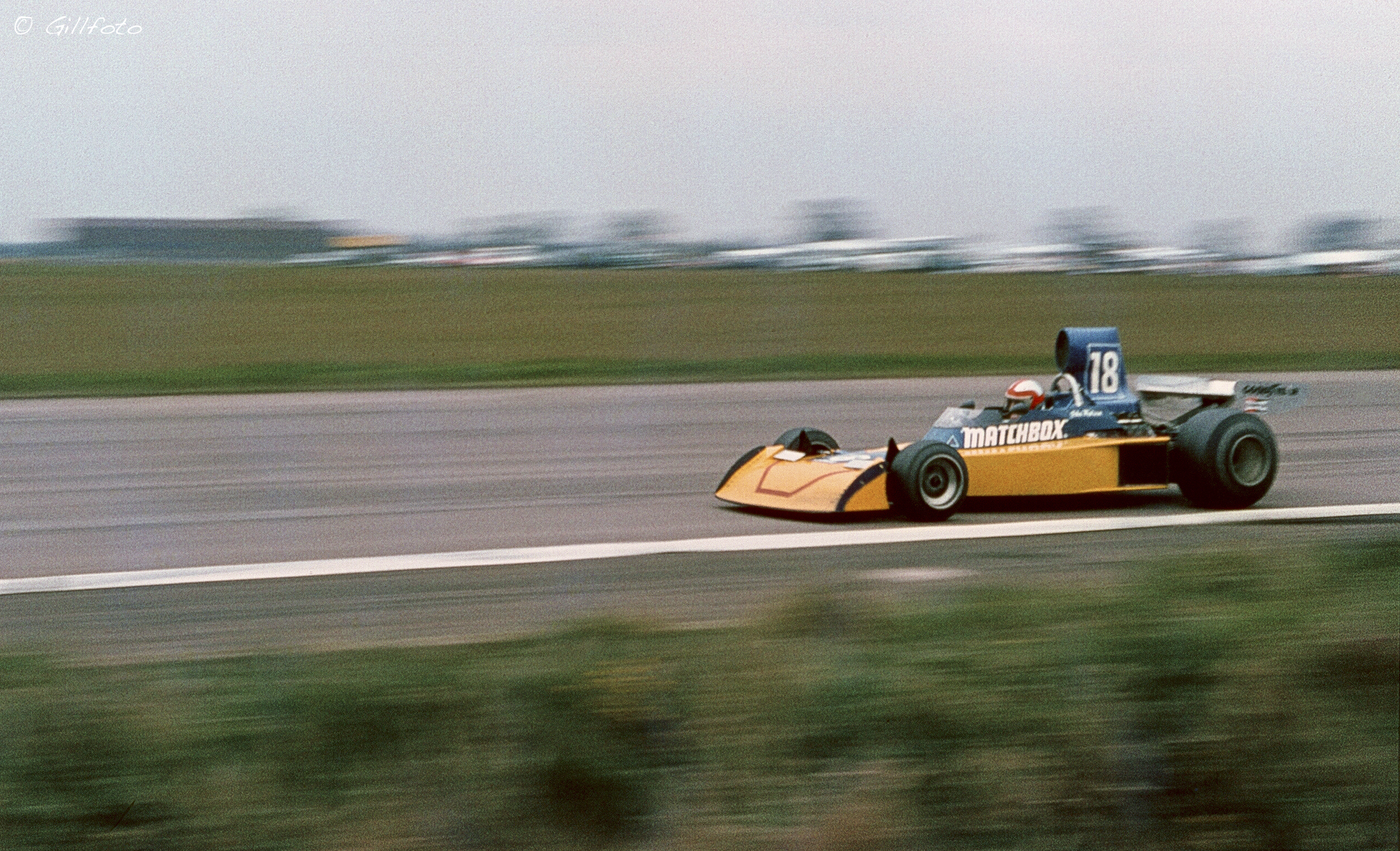
John Watson driving a Surtees TS16 with Matchbox livery.

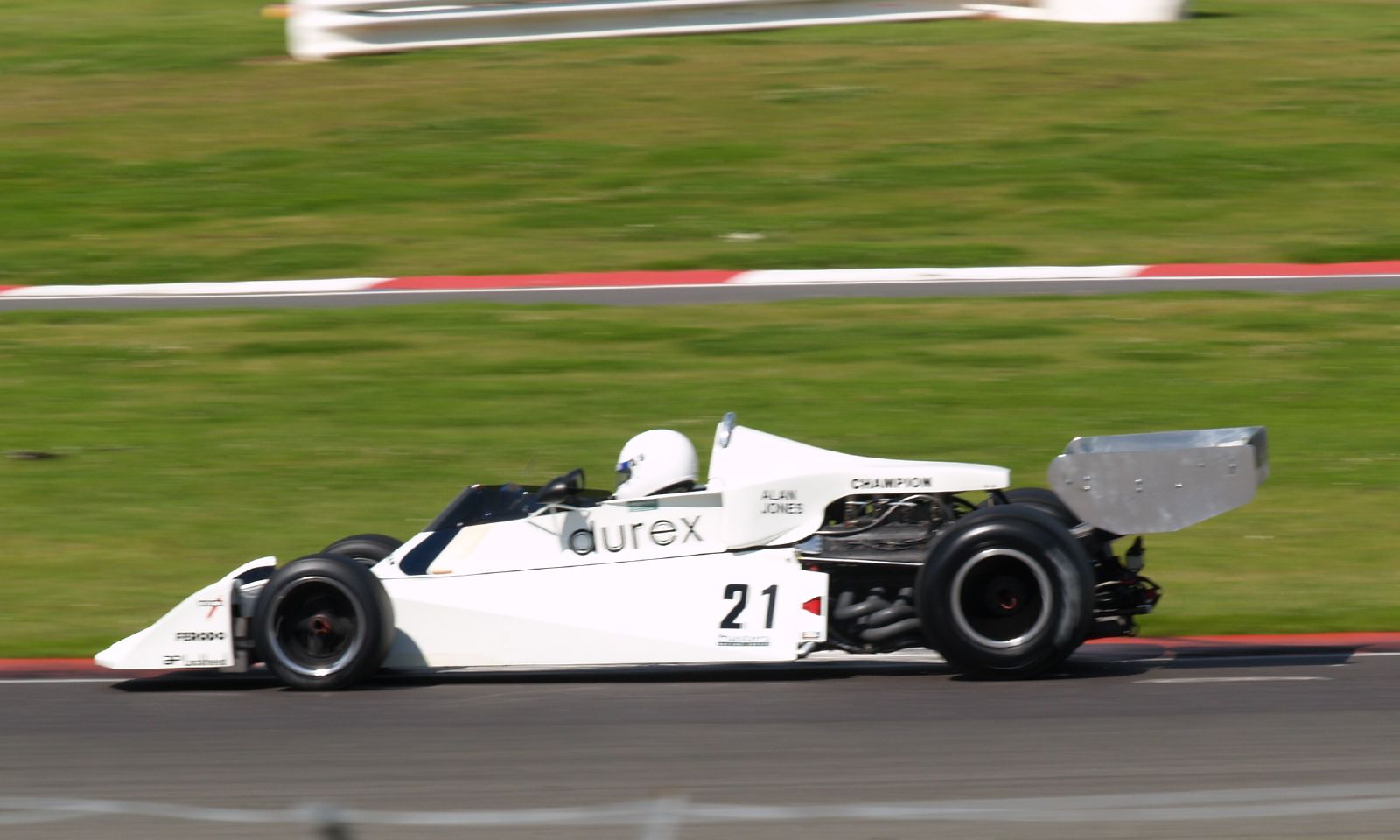
In 1976, Surtees gained sponsorship from condom manufacturer Durex. The BBC refused to broadcast the British Grand Prix due to the sponsor on this car

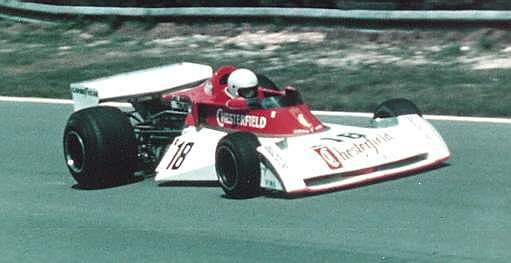
In 1977, Chesterfield sponsored Surtees

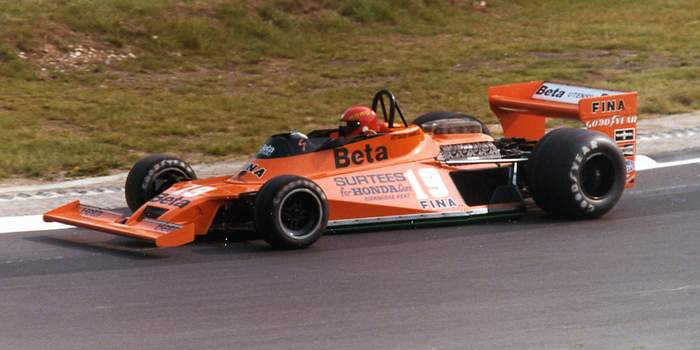
Vittorio Brambilla at the 1978 British Grand Prix

== Tecno ==
Year	Main colour(s)	Additional colour(s)	Main sponsor(s)	Additional major sponsor(s)
1972–1973	Red	Blue	Martini	Castrol, Firestone

== Toleman ==
Year	Main colour(s)	Additional colour(s)	Main sponsor(s)	Additional major sponsor(s)	Non-tobacco/alcohol livery changes
1981	Blue	Red, White, Green	Candy, Saima Avandero	Magirus, Sergio Tacchini	
1982	Blue	White, Red	Cougar	Pirelli	
1983	Blue	Red, White, Green	Candy	Magirus, Sergio Tacchini, Pirelli, Michelin	
1984	White	Blue, Red	Segafredo, Candy	Magirus, Sergio Tacchini, Pirelli, Michelin	
1985	White, Blue	Country Flags,	United Colors of Benetton	Agip, Pirelli	

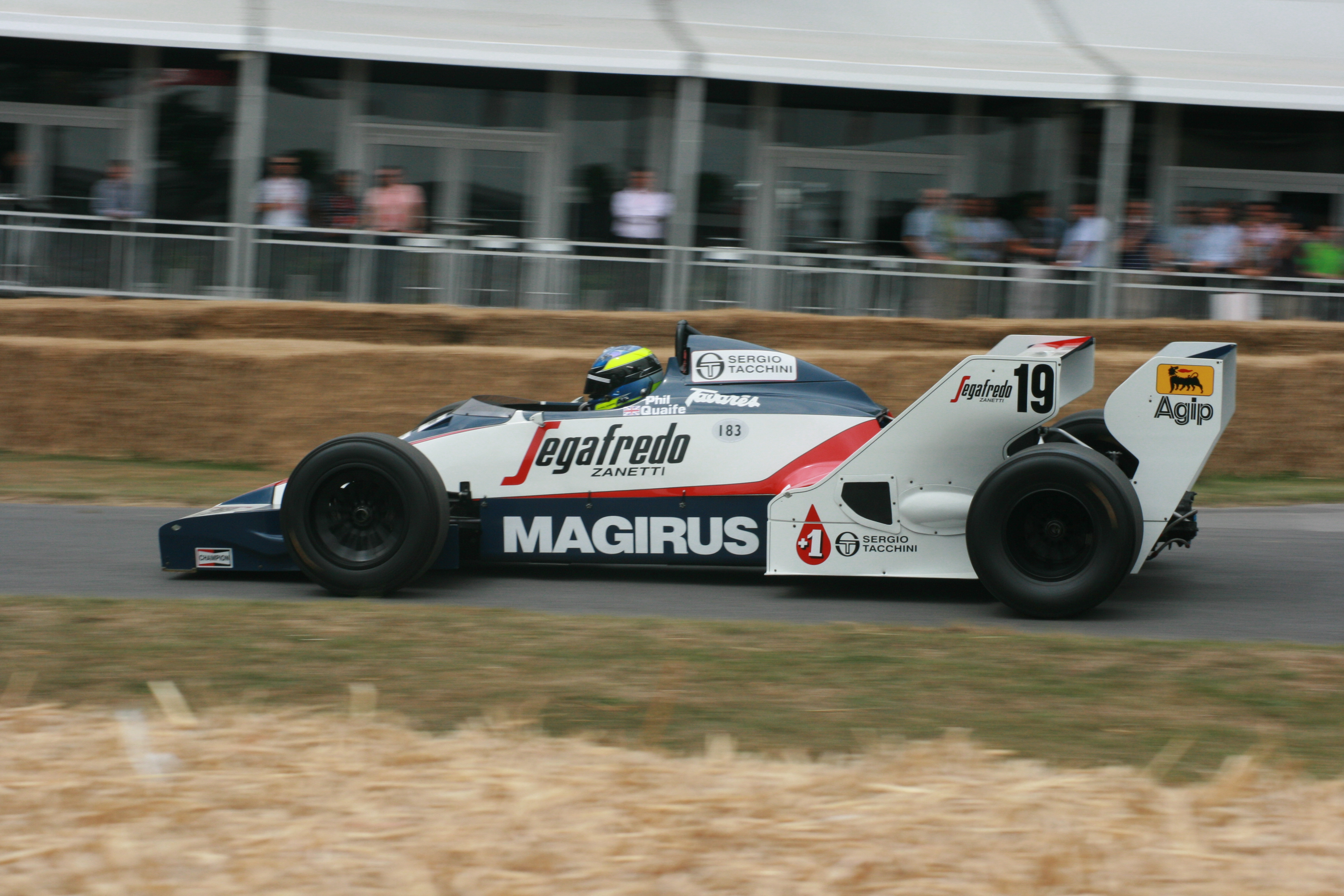
A Toleman TG183B at the 2010 Goodwood Festival of Speed

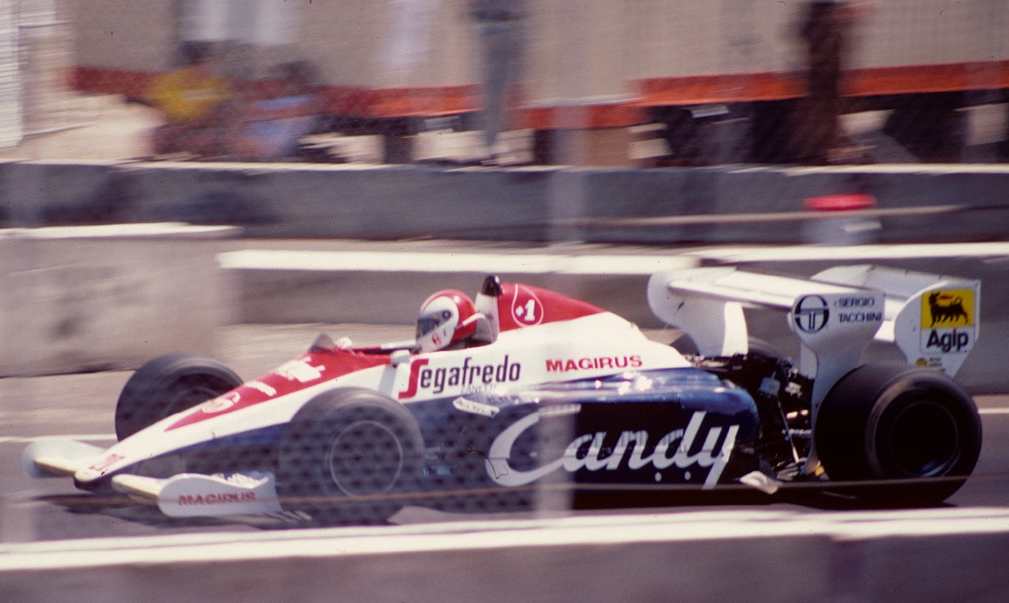
Johnny Cecotto driving for Toleman at the 1984 Dallas GP

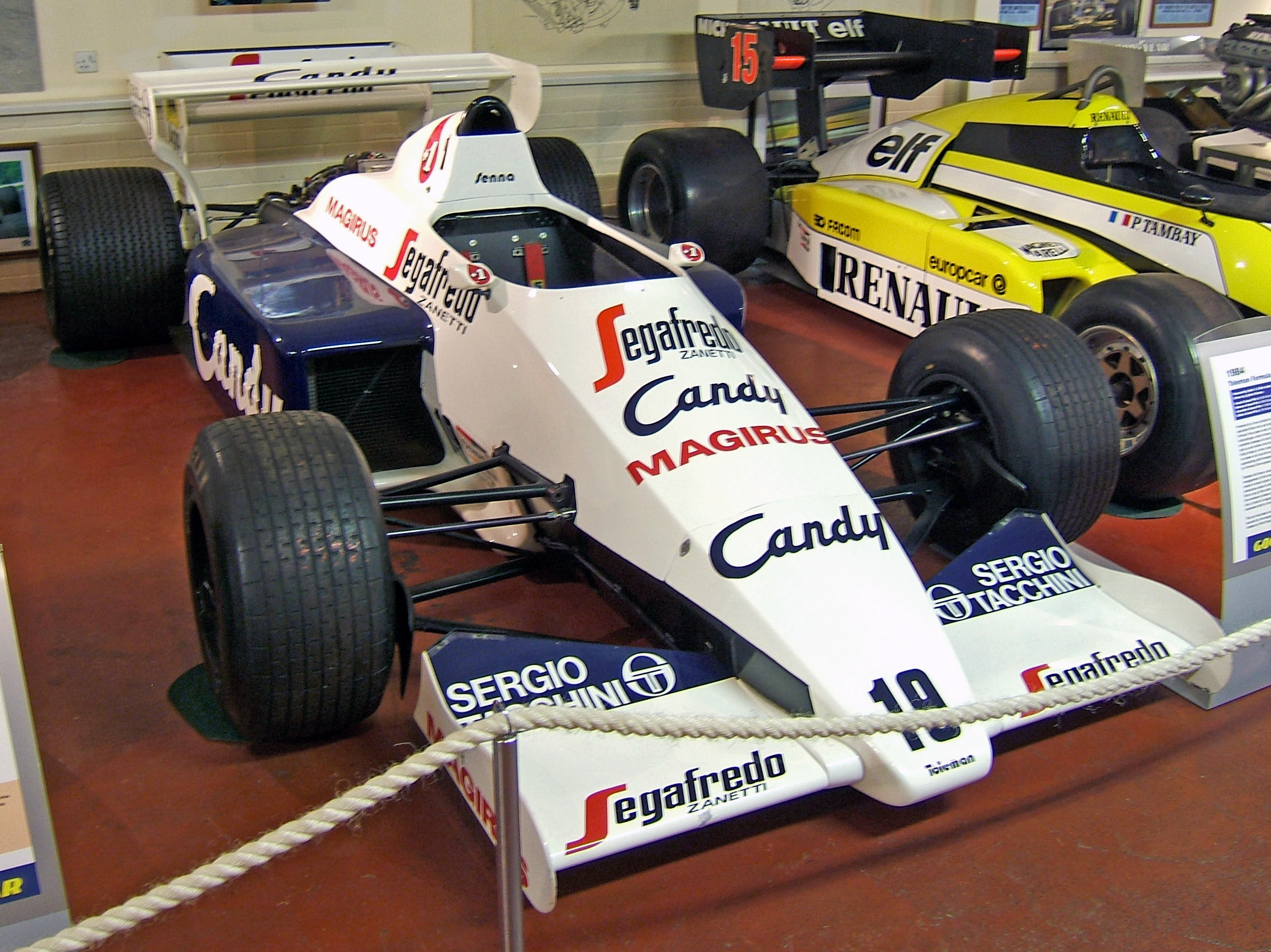
Ayrton Senna's Toleman TG184 car, with which he took second place at the 1984 Monaco Grand Prix

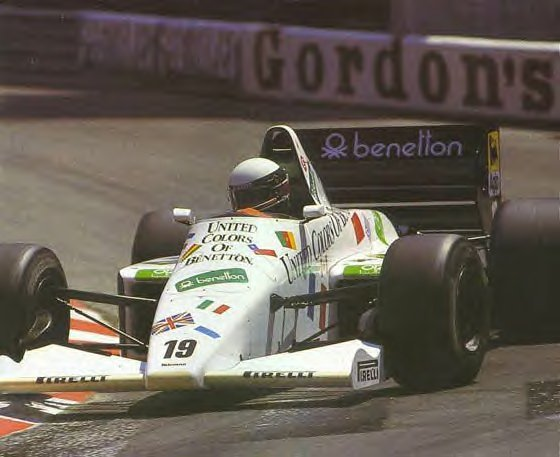
Teo Fabi driving the Toleman TG185 in the 1985 season.

== Toro Rosso ==
Toro Rosso is the sister team of Red Bull Racing. Since it originated from the buyout of Minardi, its name means Red Bull in Italian. At the beginning, the team used to have the same name and sponsors as its parent team, with the major difference being the presence of a scarlet "charging bull" painted over the engine cowling.

Year	Main colour(s)	Additional colour(s)	Livery sponsor(s)	Additional major sponsor(s)
2006–2009	Dark Blue	Red, Gold	Red Bull	Bridgestone (2007–2009), Cosworth (2006), Wings For Life (2006), Magneti Marelli (2007–2009)
2010	Dark Blue	Red, Gold	Red Bull	Red Bull Mobile, Speed Week, Money Service Group, Siemens
2011	Dark Blue	Red, Gold	Red Bull	Red Bull Mobile, Money Service Group, Red Bulletin, Speed Week, Siemens, Pirelli, Cepsa
2012–2013	Dark Blue	Red, Gold	Red Bull	Cepsa, Servus TV, Red Bulletin, Red Bull Mobile, Falcon Private Bank, NOVA Chemicals, Speed Week, Siemens, Pirelli, CD-adapco (2013)
2014–2015	Dark Blue	Red, Gold	Red Bull	Cepsa, NOVA Chemicals, Siemens, Pirelli, Sapinda, Renault, Servus TV, Red Bulletin, Red Bull Mobile, CD-adapco, Speed Week, Estrella Galicia (2015)
2016	Dark Blue	Red, Gold	Red Bull	Casio Edifice, Servus TV, Red Bulletin, Red Bull Mobile, Pirelli, Sapinda, Speed Week, Falcon Private Bank, Estrella Galicia, Acronis
2017–2019	Blue	Red, Silver	Red Bull	Casio Edifice, Simply Cola, Speed Week, Servus TV (2017), Red Bulletin (2017), Red Bull Mobile (2017), Pirelli, Estrella Galicia (2017), Acronis (2017–2018), Mobil 1 (2017), Esso (2017), Honda (2018–2019), KFC (2018), MyWorld (2019), Buzz (2019), Moose Craft Cider (2019), PTT Lubricants (2019), Tennor (2019)

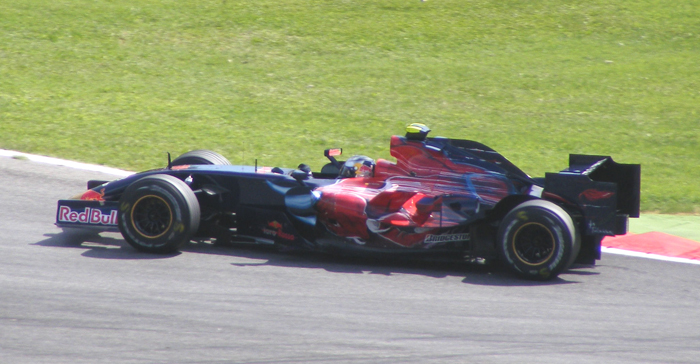
Sebastian Vettel driving the Toro Rosso STR2 at the 2007 Italian Grand Prix.

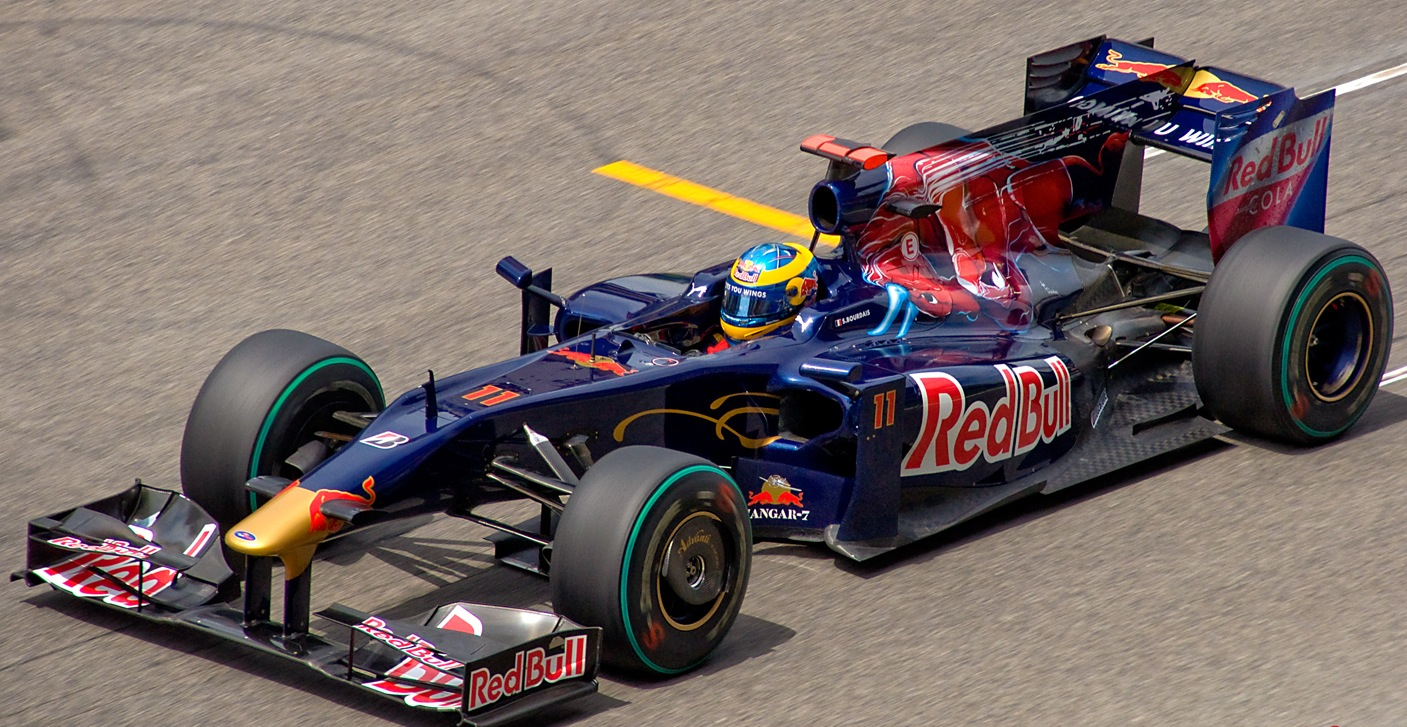
Sébastien Bourdais driving the Toro Rosso STR4 at the 2009 Spanish Grand Prix.

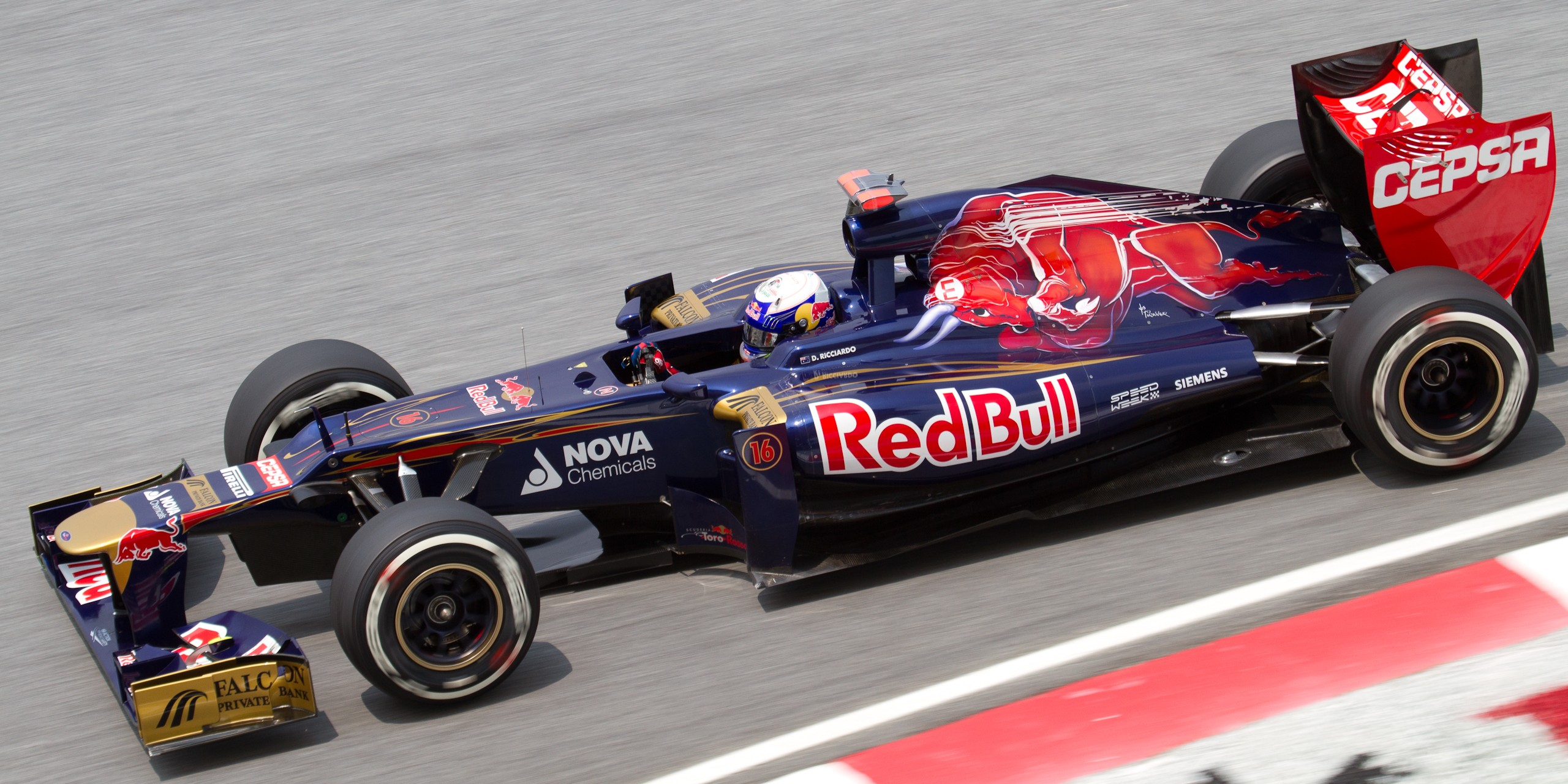
Sponsorship from Falcon Bank brought more gold to the team's livery. This is Daniel Ricciardo driving the STR7 at the 2012 Malaysian Grand Prix.

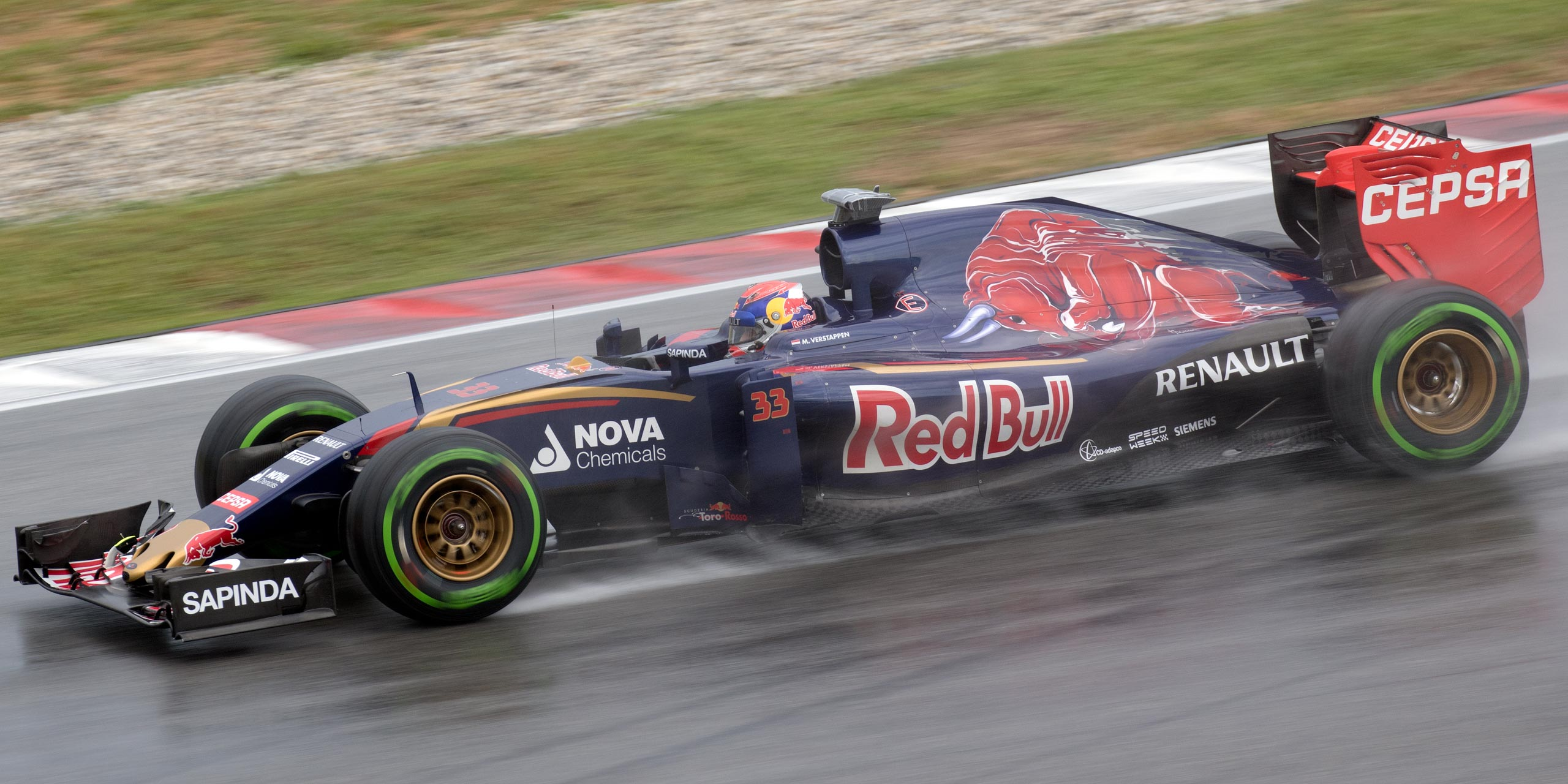
Max Verstappen driving the Toro Rosso STR10 at the 2015 Malaysian Grand Prix.

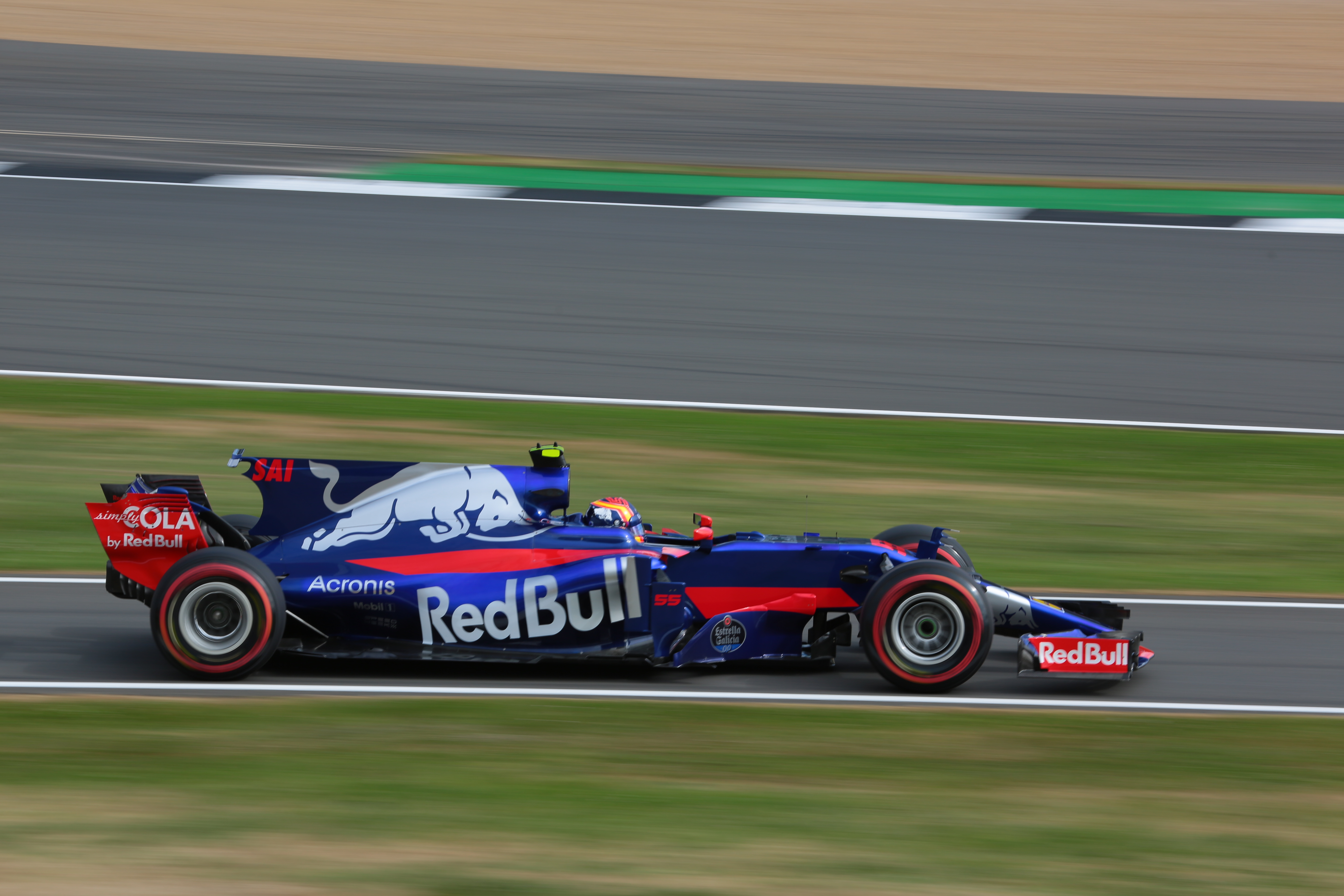
The Toro Rosso STR12 driven by Carlos Sainz, Jr. at the 2017 British Grand Prix.

== Toyota ==
Year	Main colour(s)	Additional colour(s)	Main sponsor(s)	Additional major sponsor(s)	Special liveries
2002–2009	White, Red		Panasonic, Toyota	Denso, Esso, KDDI, Kärcher, Wella, Intel, EMC, BMC Software, Time Inc., Magneti Marelli, Avex Group, Ratiopharm (2002), Travelex (2002–03), Dassault Systèmes (2002–06), EBBON-DACS (2003–08), Star Sports (2004), Kingfisher Airlines (2007), World Food Programme by ALJ (2009), Würth (2009)	The team supported movies The Dark Knight at the 2008 British Grand Prix respectively.

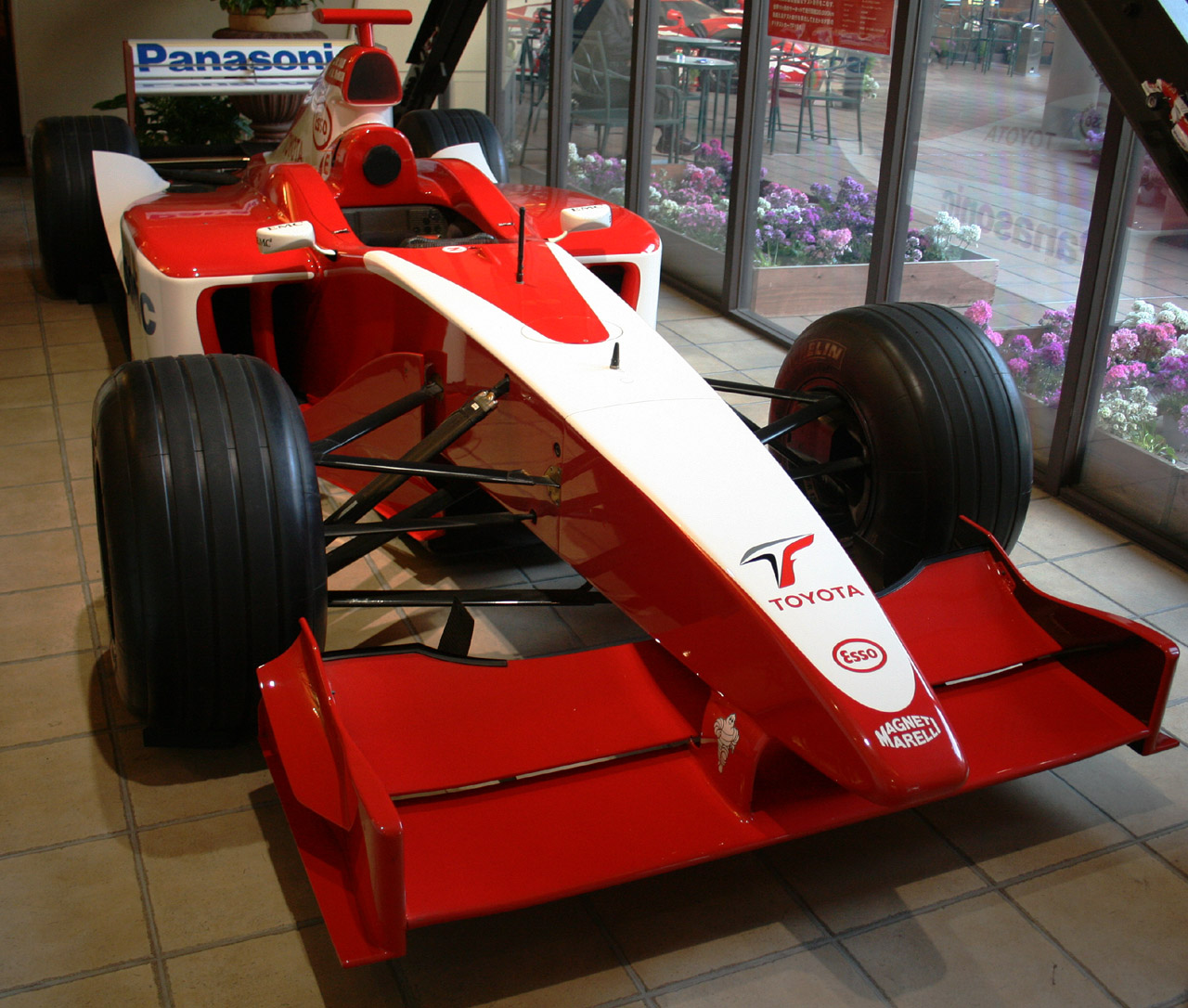
The 2001 Toyota TF101 (AM01), which was used for testing and never raced.

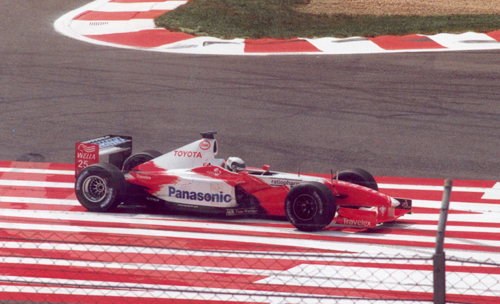
Allan McNish driving the Toyota TF102 at the 2002 French Grand Prix.

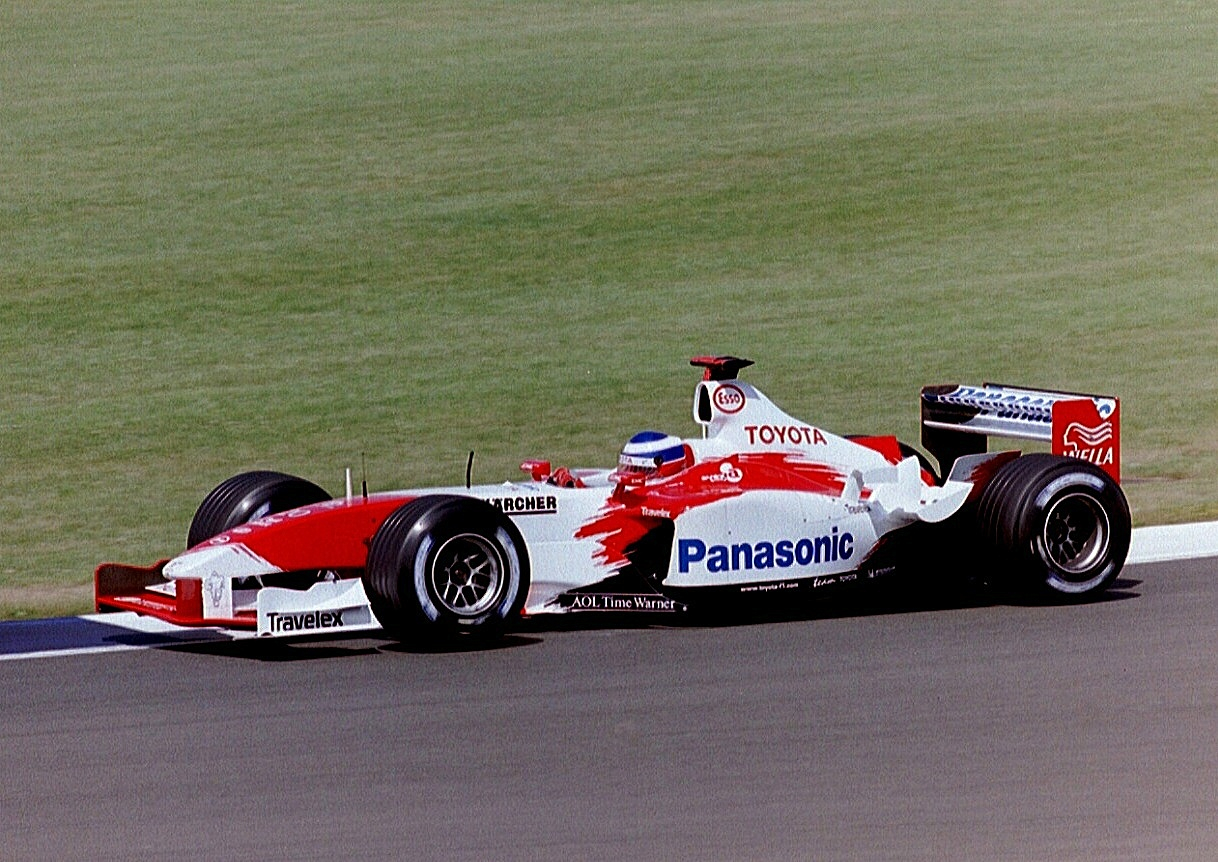
Olivier Panis driving the Toyota TF103 at the 2003 British Grand Prix.

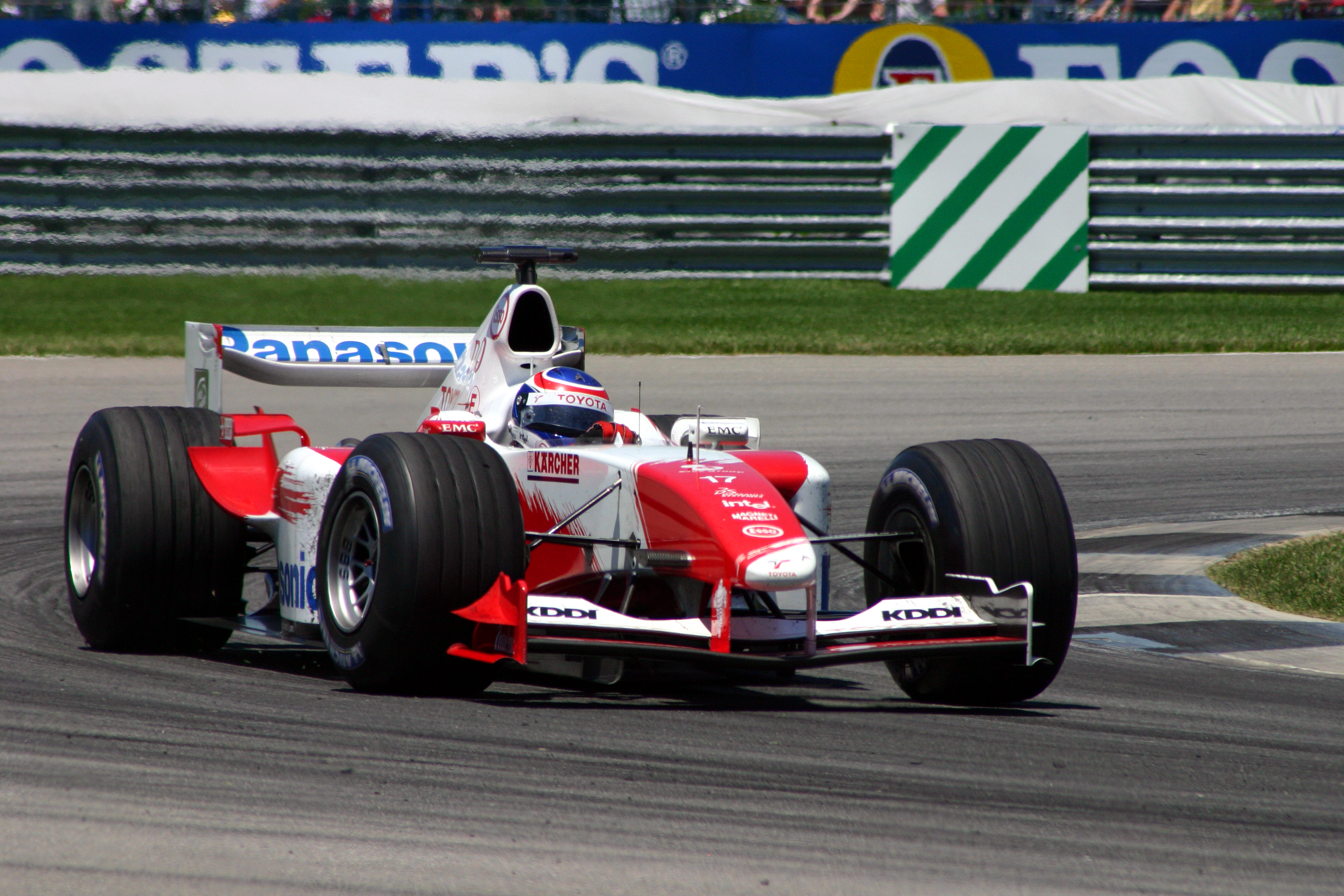
Olivier Panis driving the Toyota TF104 at the 2004 United States Grand Prix.

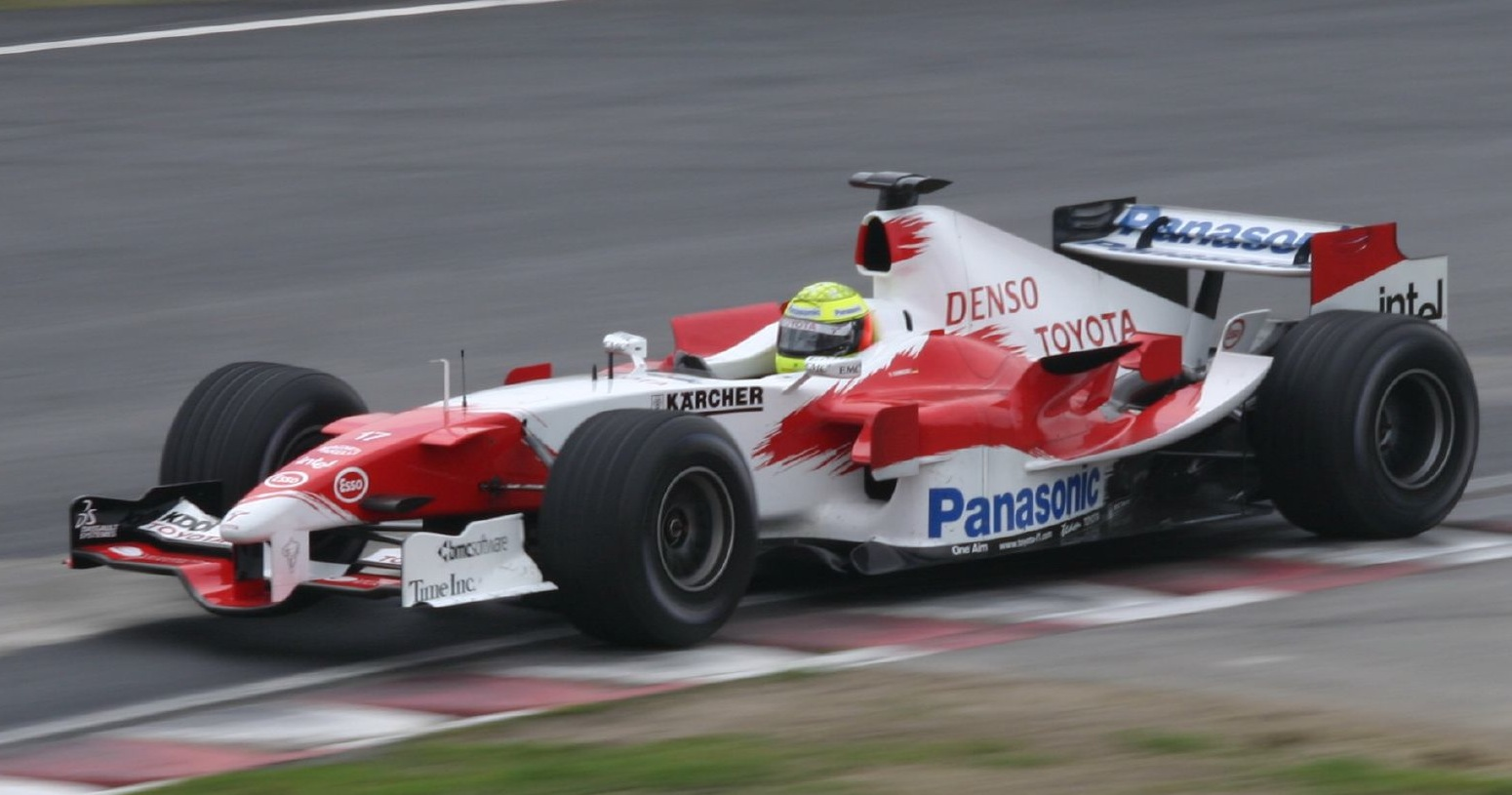
Ralf Schumacher driving the Toyota TF105 at the 2005 Canadian Grand Prix.

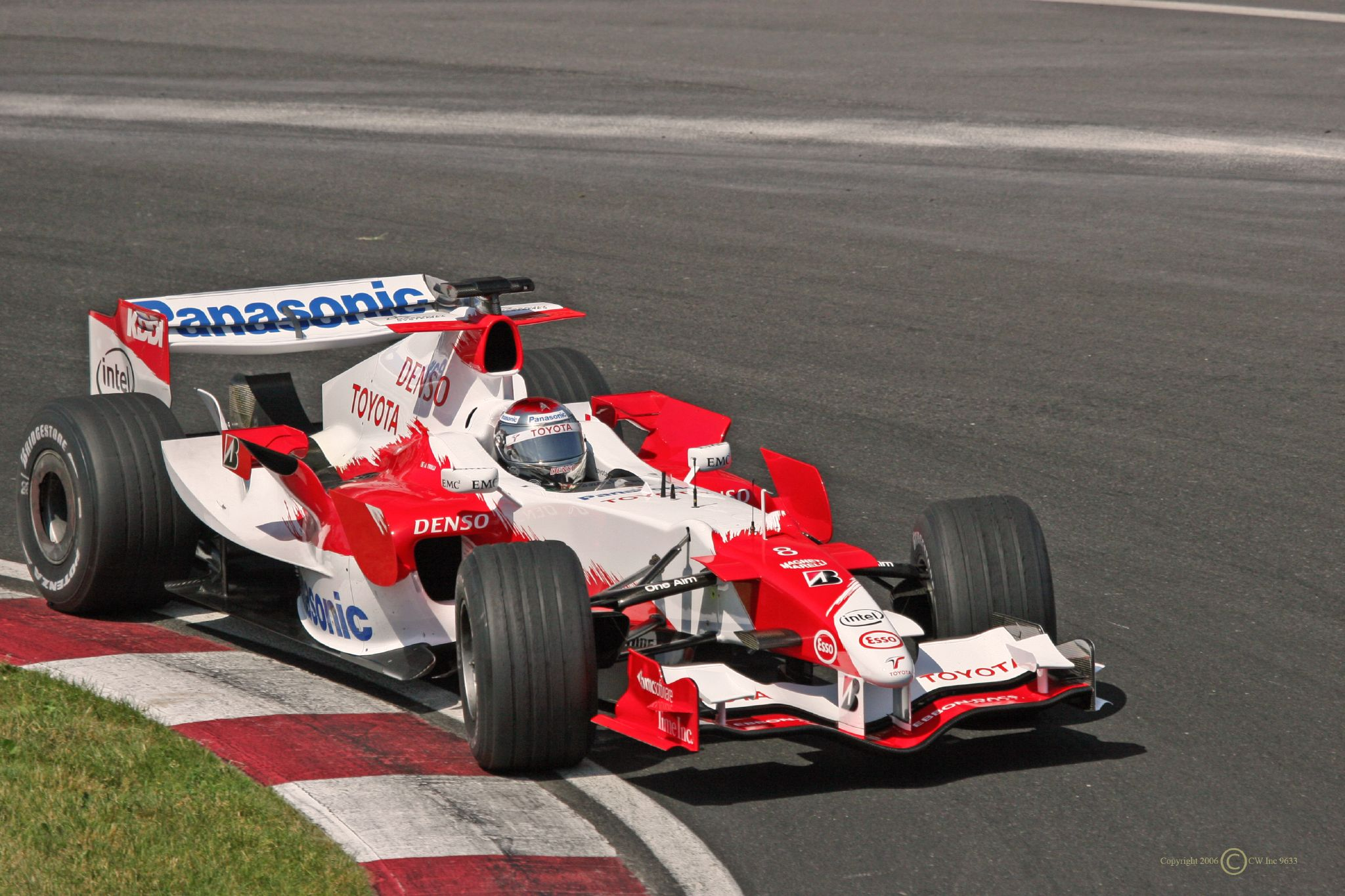
Jarno Trulli driving the Toyota TF106 at the 2006 Canadian Grand Prix.

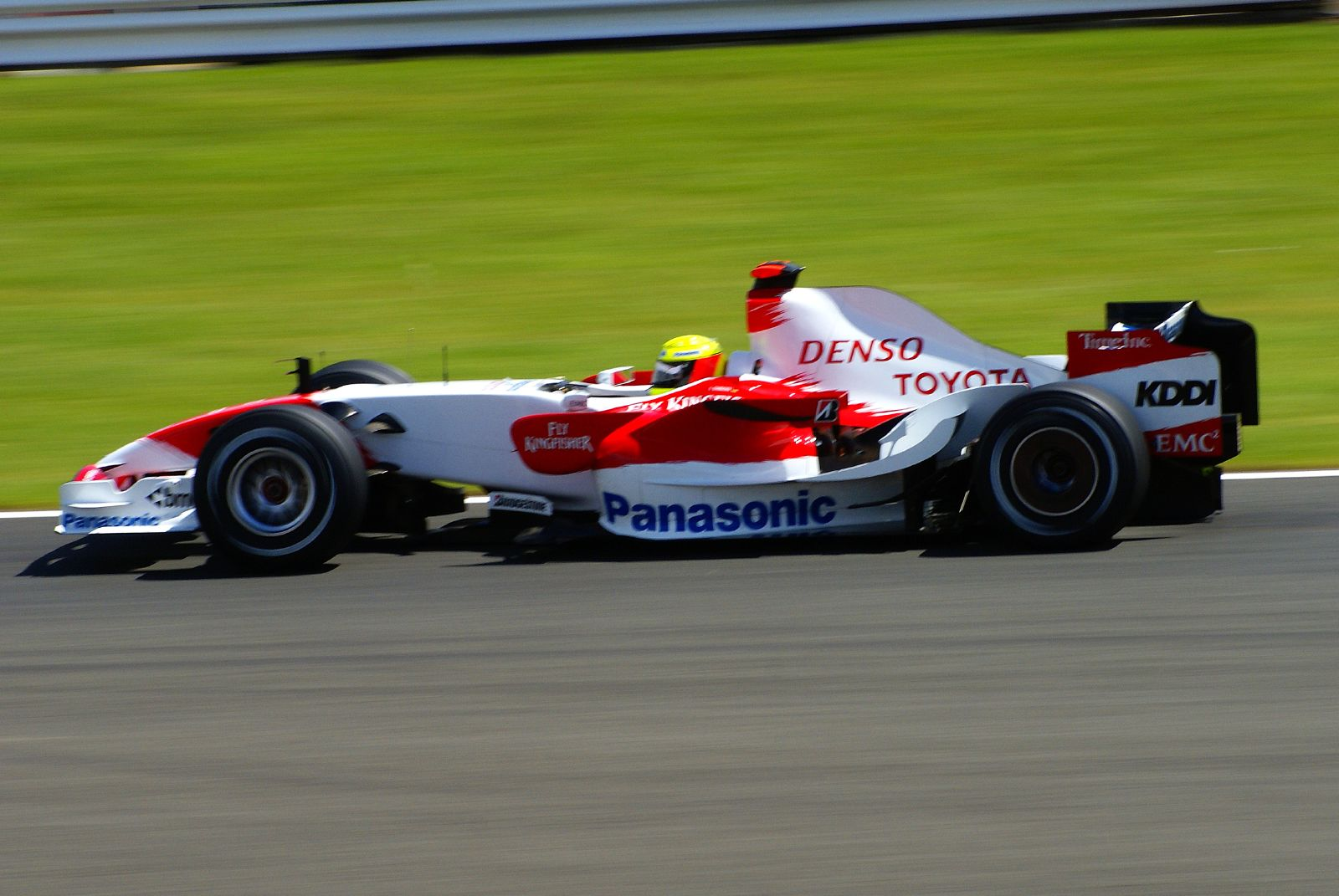
Ralf Schumacher driving the Toyota TF107 at the 2007 British Grand Prix.

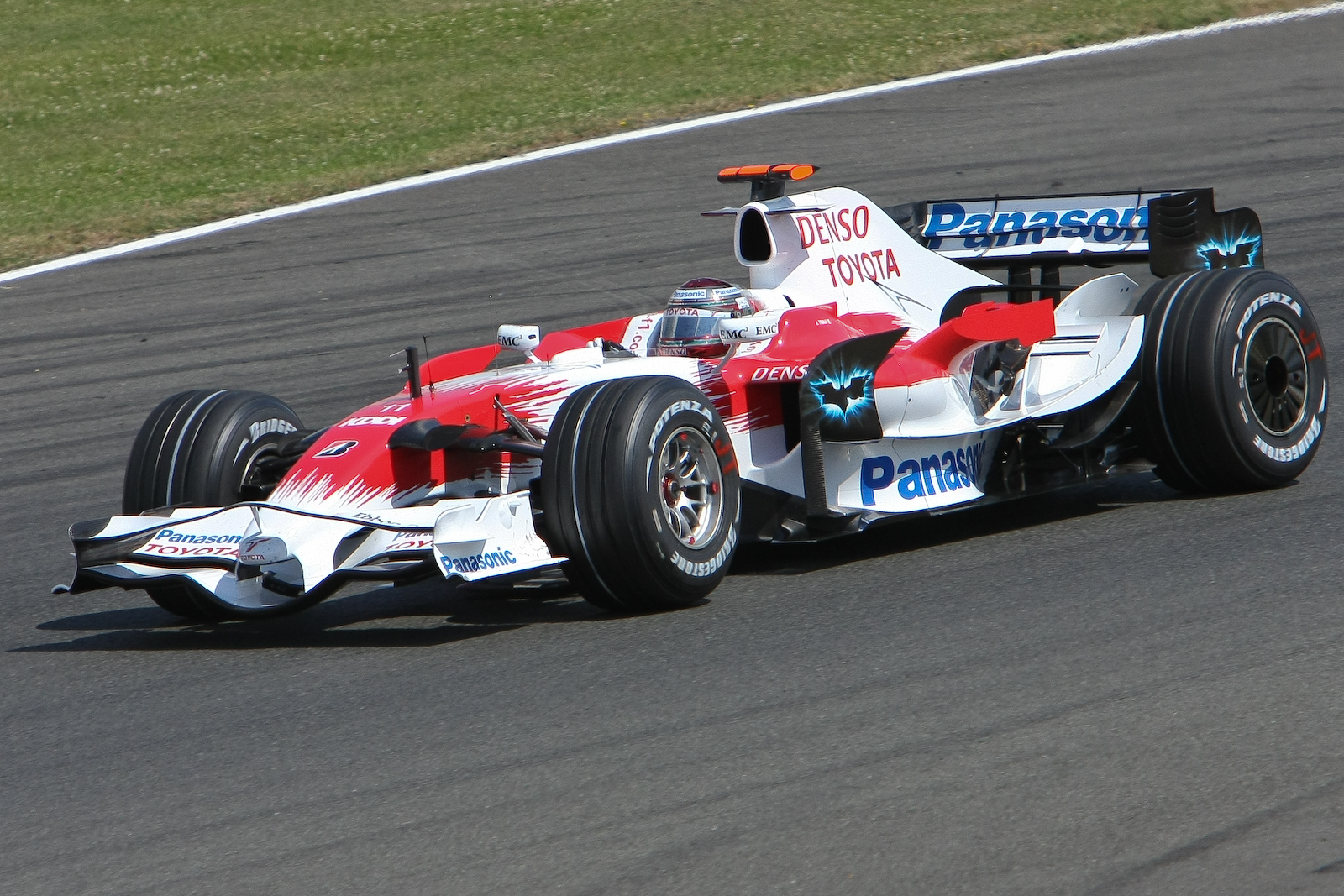
Jarno Trulli driving the Toyota TF108 at the 2008 British Grand Prix.

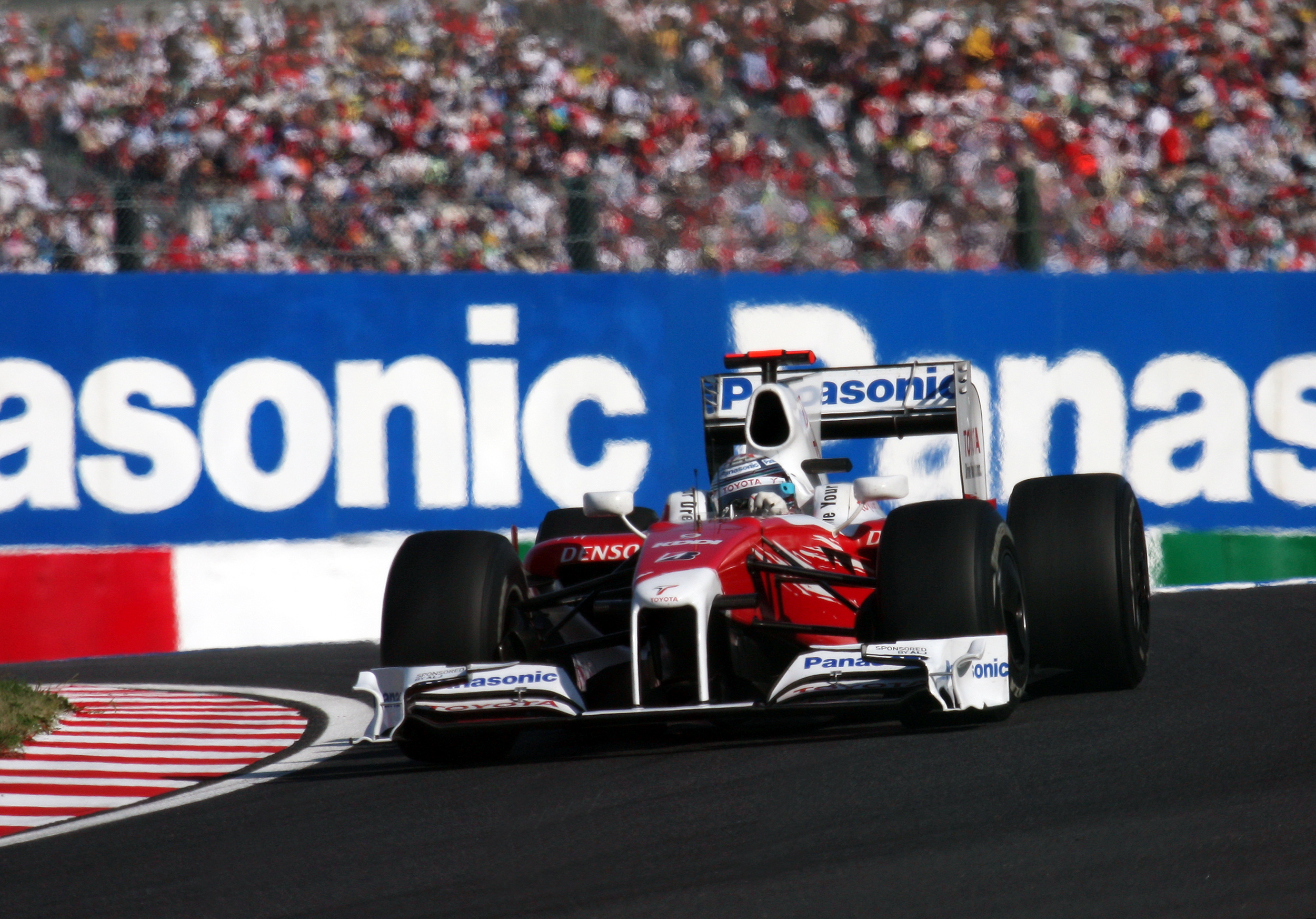
Jarno Trulli driving the Toyota TF109 at the 2009 Japanese Grand Prix.

== Theodore Racing ==
Year	Main colour(s)	Additional colour(s)	Main sponsor(s)	Additional major sponsor(s)
1977	White	Red	Theodore Racing	Elf Aquitaine, Goodyear
1978	White	Red	Kecn Kemden & Blusen	Theodore Racing, Air Press, Hi-Line
1981	White	Red	Euro Hi-Fi Video / Cognac Courvoisier / Hi-Line / Rombo	Theodore Racing
1982	White	Red	Allwave, Interstate Auto Design	Theodore Racing, Hawa Air Antwerpen, Lindemann, Valvoline
1983	Navy Blue	White	Segafredo, Sanyo	Pikenz, Conte of Florence, Champion, Valvoline

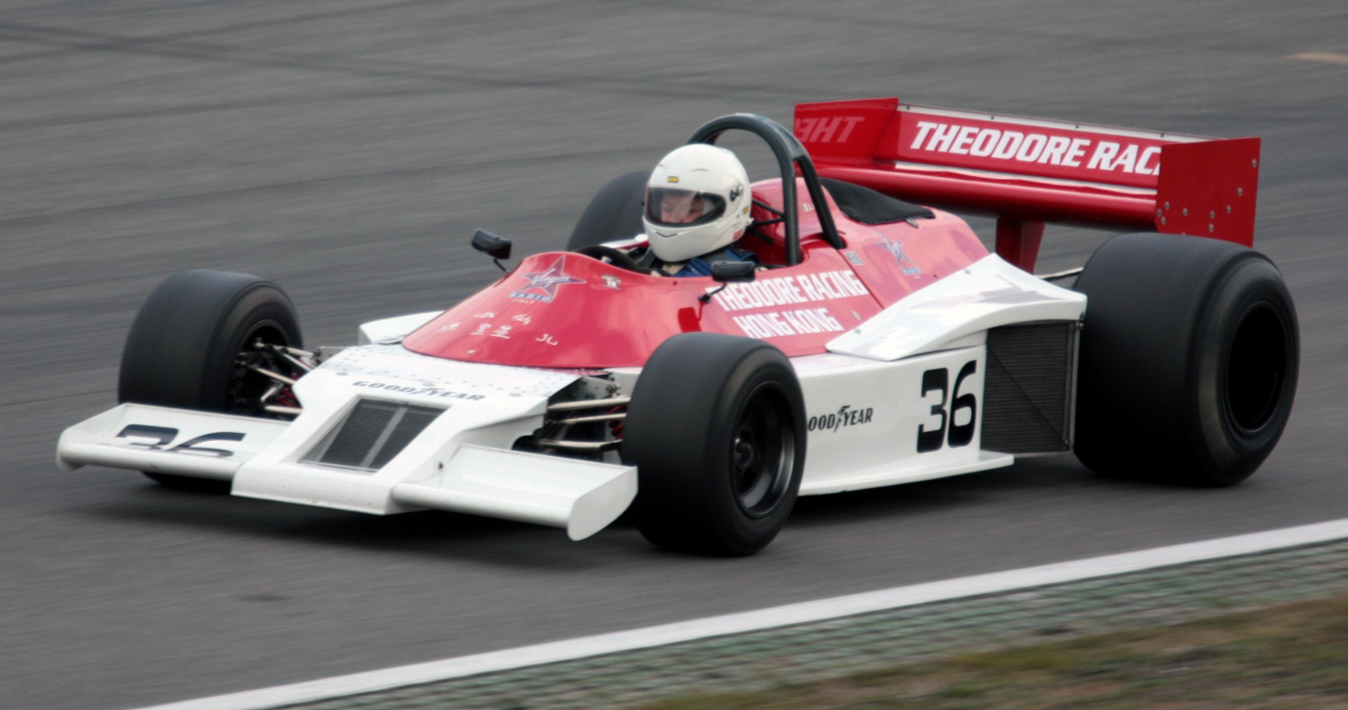
Theodore TR1 from 1978, at the 2011 Hockenheim Historic Race.

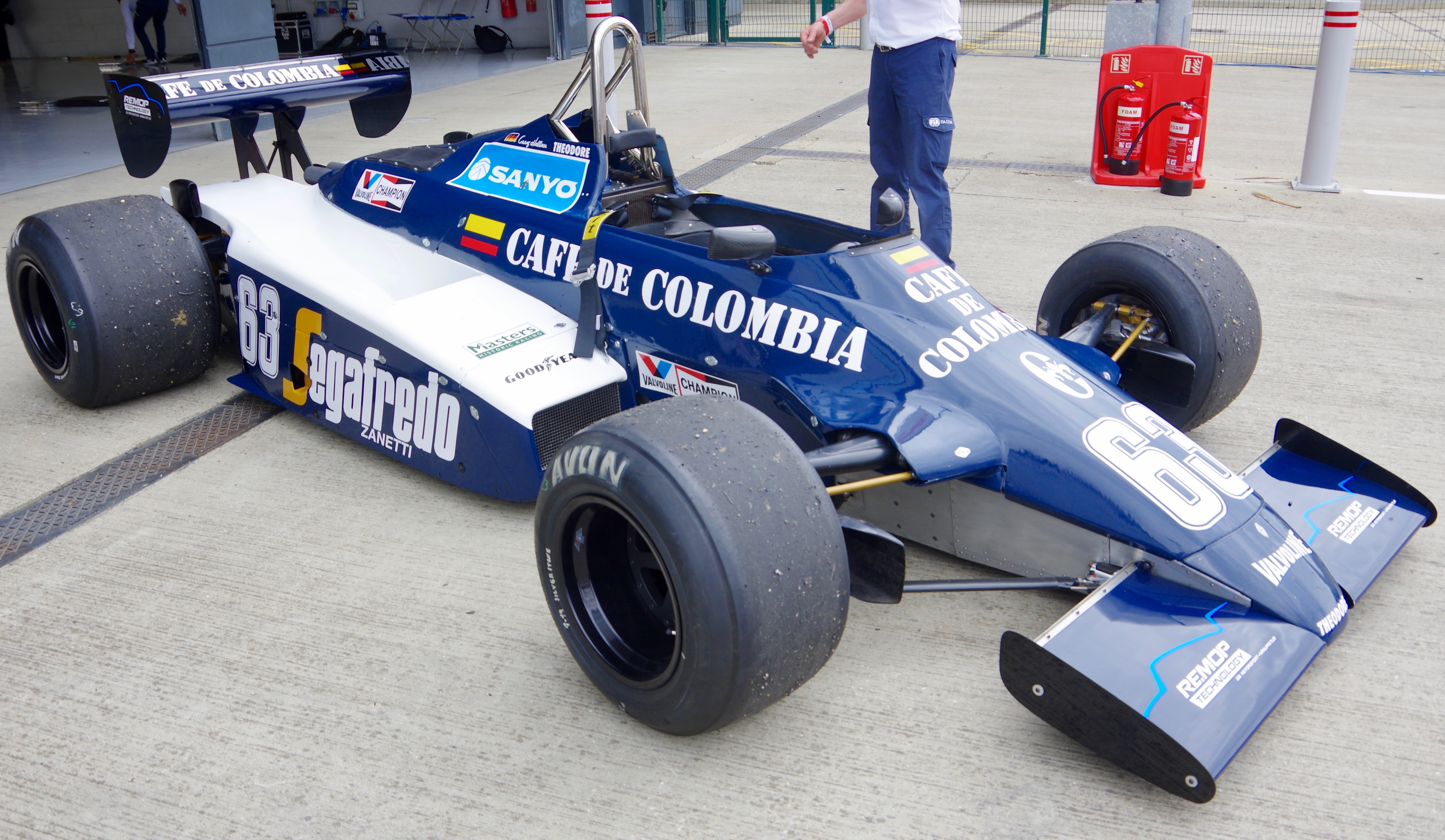
Roberto Guerrero's Theodore N183 from the 1983 season.

== Trojan ==
Year	Main colour(s)	Additional colour(s)	Main sponsor(s)	Additional major sponsor(s)
1974	White	Red	Homelite, Suzuki GB	Champion, Firestone

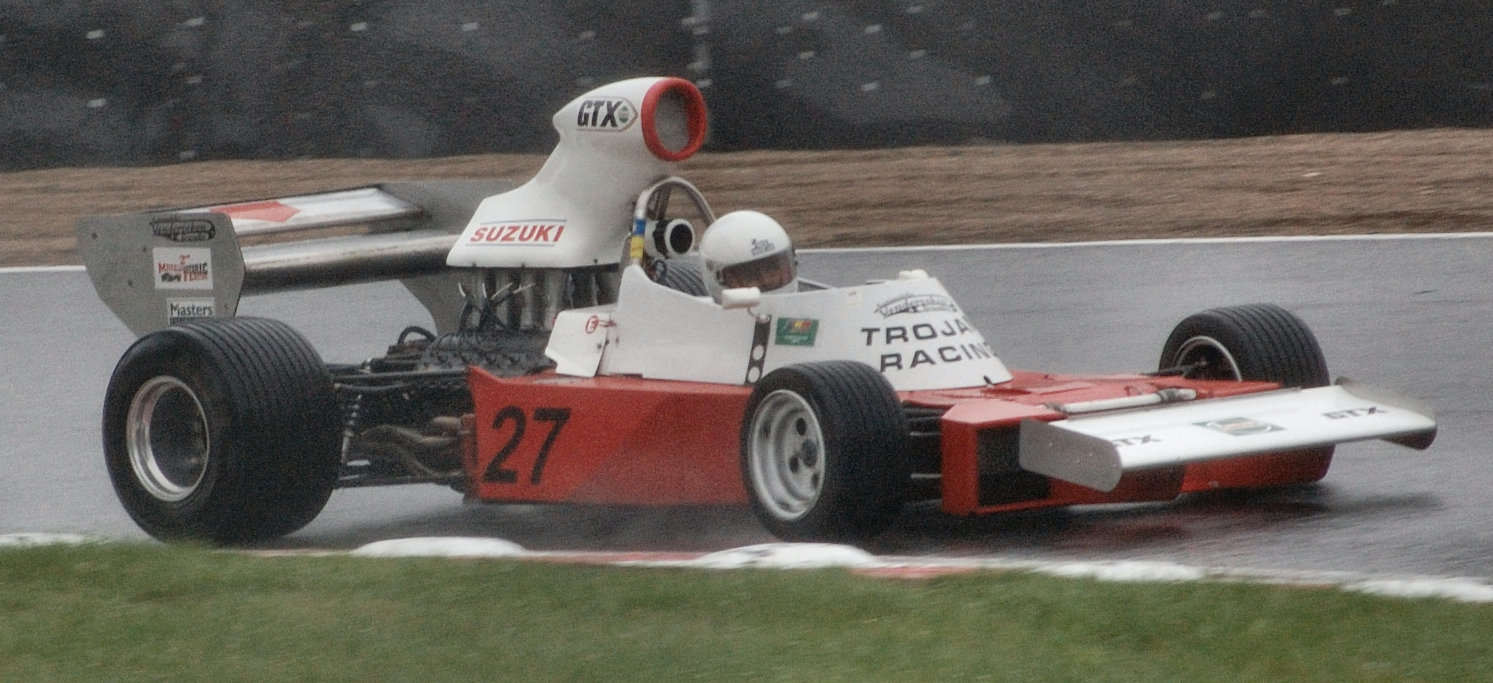
Tim Schenken driving his Trojan 103 at Brands Hatch.

== Tyrrell ==
Tyrrell Racing competed in Formula One from 1970–1998. Its traditional colour was blue and white, or a combination as such, for most of the 1970s and 1980s. The cars were more white during the mid to late 1990s.

Year	Driver(s)	Main colour(s)	Livery sponsor(s)	Additional major sponsor(s)	Notes
1970	Jackie Stewart; Johnny Servoz-Gavin; François Cevert	Blue	Elf	Dunlop	
1971	Jackie Stewart; François Cevert; Peter Revson	Blue	Elf	Ford, Autolite	
1972	Jackie Stewart; François Cevert; Patrick Depailler	Blue	Elf	Ford, Autolite	
1973	Jackie Stewart; François Cevert; Chris Amon	Blue	Elf	Ford, Autolite	
1974	Jody Scheckter; Patrick Depailler	Blue	Elf	Ford, Autolite	
1975	Jody Scheckter; Patrick Depailler; Jean-Pierre Jabouille; Michel Leclère	Blue	Elf	Ford, Autolite	
1976	Jody Scheckter; Patrick Depailler	Blue	Elf	Ford, Autolite	At the 1976 Japanese GP, Tyrrell was written in hiragana
1977	Ronnie Peterson; Patrick Depailler	Blue, White	Elf, First National City Travelers Checks		
1978	Didier Pironi; Patrick Depailler	Blue, White	Elf, First National City Travelers Checks		
1979	Didier Pironi; Jean-Pierre Jarier; Geoff Lees; Derek Daly	Blue	Candy (from Belgian Grand Prix onwards)		
1980	Jean-Pierre Jarier; Derek Daly; Mike Thackwell	Blue	Candy		
1981	Eddie Cheever	White or Blue	Imola Cermica (from San Marino Grand Prix onwards) Simac PastaMatic (Canadian Grand Prix and Caesars Palace Grand Prix only)	Valvoline	
1981	Michele Alboreto	Blue	Imola Cermica (from San Marino Grand Prix onwards) Simac PastaMatic (Canadian Grand Prix and Caesars Palace Grand Prix only)	Valvoline	
1981	Ricardo Zunino	Blue		Coca-Cola; YPF; Valvoline	
1981	Kevin Cogan	Black	Michelob	Café Figaro, Parnelli Jones Enterprises, Valvoline	
1982	Michele Alboreto; Slim Borgudd; Brian Henton	White, Blue	Candy (San Marino Grand Prix, Belgian Grand Prix and Monaco Grand Prix only) Denim Musk (Italian Grand Prix and Caesars Palace Grand Prix only)	Imola Ceramica (San Marino Grand Prix, Belgian Grand Prix and Monaco Grand Prix only), 7-Eleven (Caesars Palace Grand Prix only), Simac (Italian Grand Prix only), Valvoline	
1983	Michele Alboreto; Danny Sullivan	Green	Benetton	Sisley, Goodyear, Courtaulds	
1984	Martin Brundle	Various	De'Longhi; Yardley Gold	Courtaulds, Ford, Old Milwaukee, Shell De'Longhi, Yardley Gold	
1984	Stefan Johansson	Various	Systime Computer Solutions	Courtaulds, Ford, Old Milwaukee, Shell De'Longhi, Yardley Gold	
1984	Stefan Bellof; Mike Thackwell	Various	Maredo	Courtaulds, Ford, Old Milwaukee, Shell De'Longhi, Yardley Gold	
1985	Martin Brundle; Stefan Johansson; Stefan Bellof; Ivan Capelli; Philippe Streiff	Black	The Porchester Group (British Grand Prix and European Grand Prix only)	Renault, Goodyear, Courtaulds, Maredo, Champion, Elf Aquitaine	
1986	Martin Brundle; Philippe Streiff	Black and White	Data General, Courtaulds	Elf, Goodyear, Koni, Renault, Rifle	
1987	Jonathan Palmer; Philippe Streiff	Black and White	Data General, Courtaulds	Elf, Goodyear, Koni, Rifle	
1988	Jonathan Palmer; Julian Bailey	Yellow and Black	Courtalds	Camel, Cavendish Finance, Data General, Unipart	
1989	Jonathan Palmer; Michele Alboreto; Jean Alesi; Johnny Herbert	Blue and Yellow	Camel (from French Grand Prix onwards)	Autobacs, Goodyear, Kidland, XP Parcel Express, Unipart	
1990	Satoru Nakajima; Jean Alesi	Blue and White	Epson	Calbee, Nippon Shinpan, PIAA Corporation, Essilor, Courtaulds	Originally Rothmans International was going to be the title sponsor, but the deal got cancelled and all the cigarettes brand logos were removed.
1991	Satoru Nakajima; Stefano Modena	Black and White	Braun	Calbee, Courtaulds, Essilor, Goodyear, Honda, Nippon Shinpan, Shell	
1992	Olivier Grouillard; Andrea de Cesaris	Red, Blue, White		Calbee, Club Angle, Elf, Essilor, Eurosport, Goodyear, Mastro Lindo, Nippon Shinpan	
1993	Ukyo Katayama; Andrea de Cesaris	Red, Blue and White	Cabin	Autodesk, Bburago, BP, Calbee, Club Angle, Goodyear, Yamaha	In non-tobacco races, Cabin was replaced with 'Challenge Spirit in F1'
1994	Ukyo Katayama; Mark Blundell	White	Mild Seven	Autodesk, BP, Calbee, Club Angle, Fondmetal, Goodyear, Yamaha	In non-tobacco races, Mild Seven was replaced with Tyrrell
1995	Ukyo Katayama; Gabriele Tarquini; Mika Salo	Blue/Blue and White	Nokia	Club Angle, Yamaha, Korean Air, Fondmetal, Mild Seven, Agip, Apan777, Hoxsin	In non-tobacco races, Mild Seven was replaced with Tyrrell
1996	Ukyo Katayama; Mika Salo	Blue	Yamaha, Korean Air, Fondmetal	Mild Seven	In non-tobacco races, Mild Seven was replaced with Tyrrell
1997	Mika Salo; Jos Verstappen	White	PIAA Corporation, Morse	Barbara MC, Real Love, ICL, Xena: Warrior Princess, Epson	
1998	Ricardo Rosset; Toranosuke Takagi	Grey, Black and White	PIAA Corporation, Morse	Safra, Brother, Lycra, European Aviation, Sun Microsystems, Ford, Goodyear, YKK, BioFox, Tartarini	

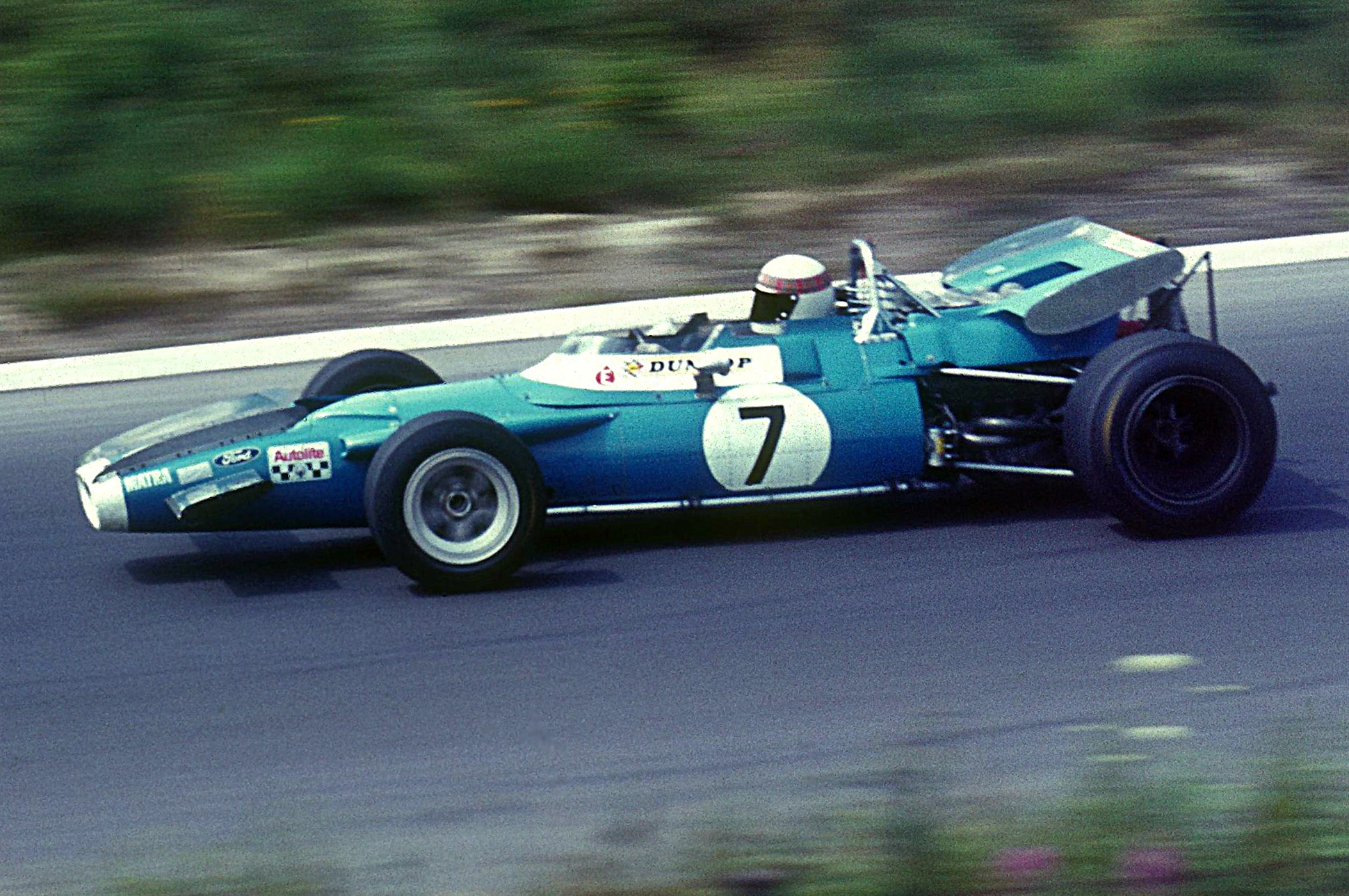
Jackie Stewart driving a Matra entered by Tyrrell Racing

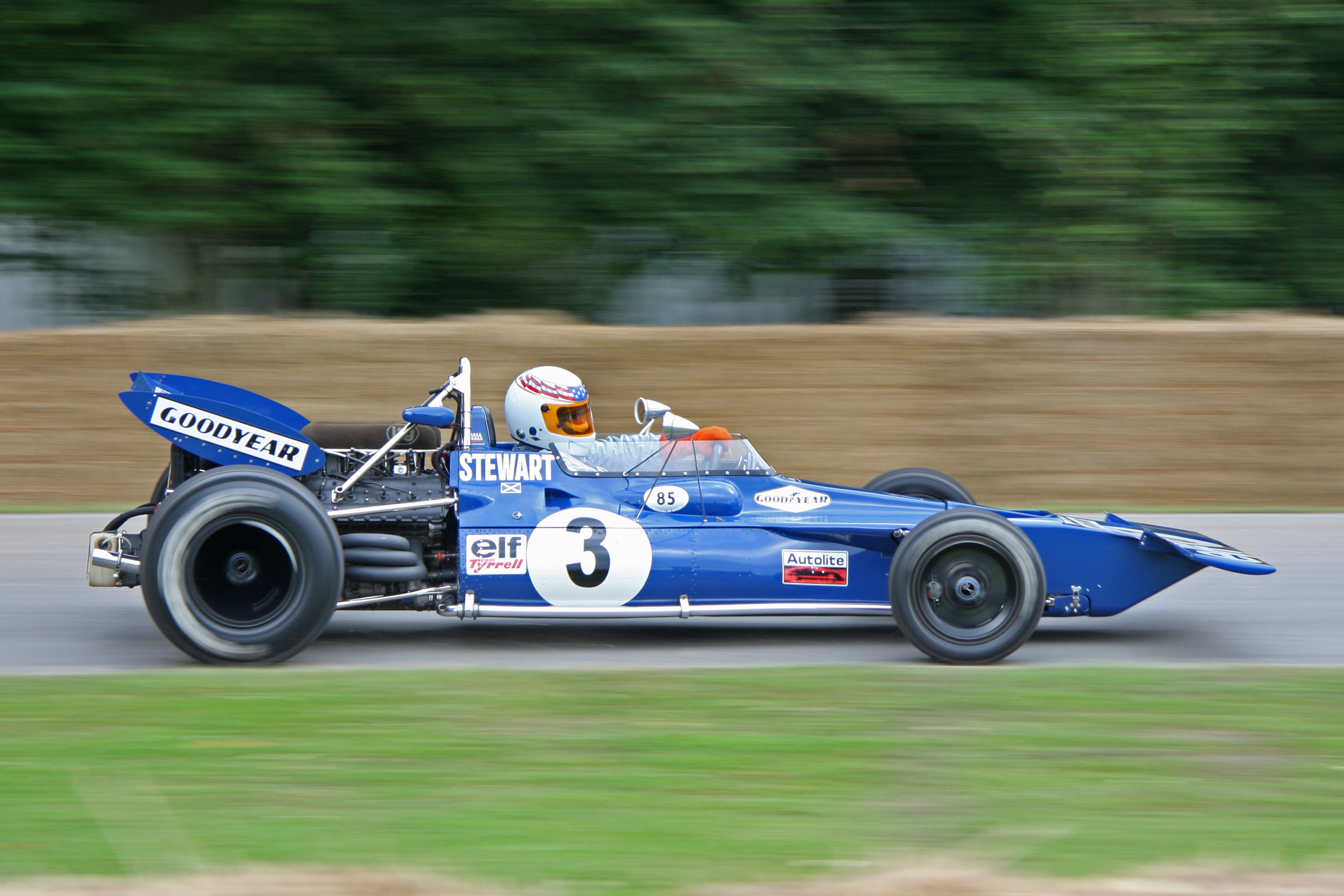
This is The Tyrrell 001, Tyrrell's first car, being demonstrated at Goodwood in 2008

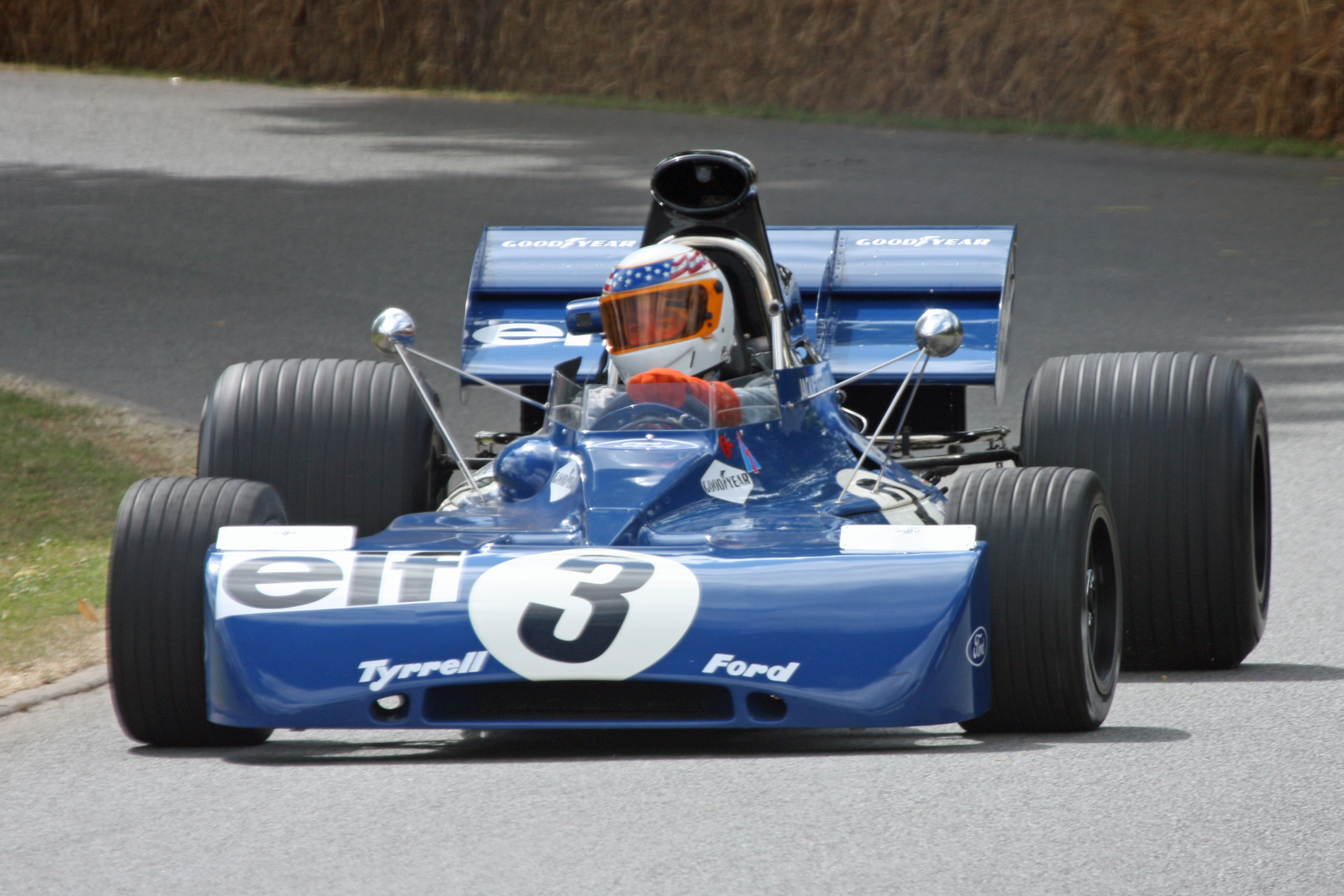
A Tyrrell 002 from the 1971 season being demonstrated.

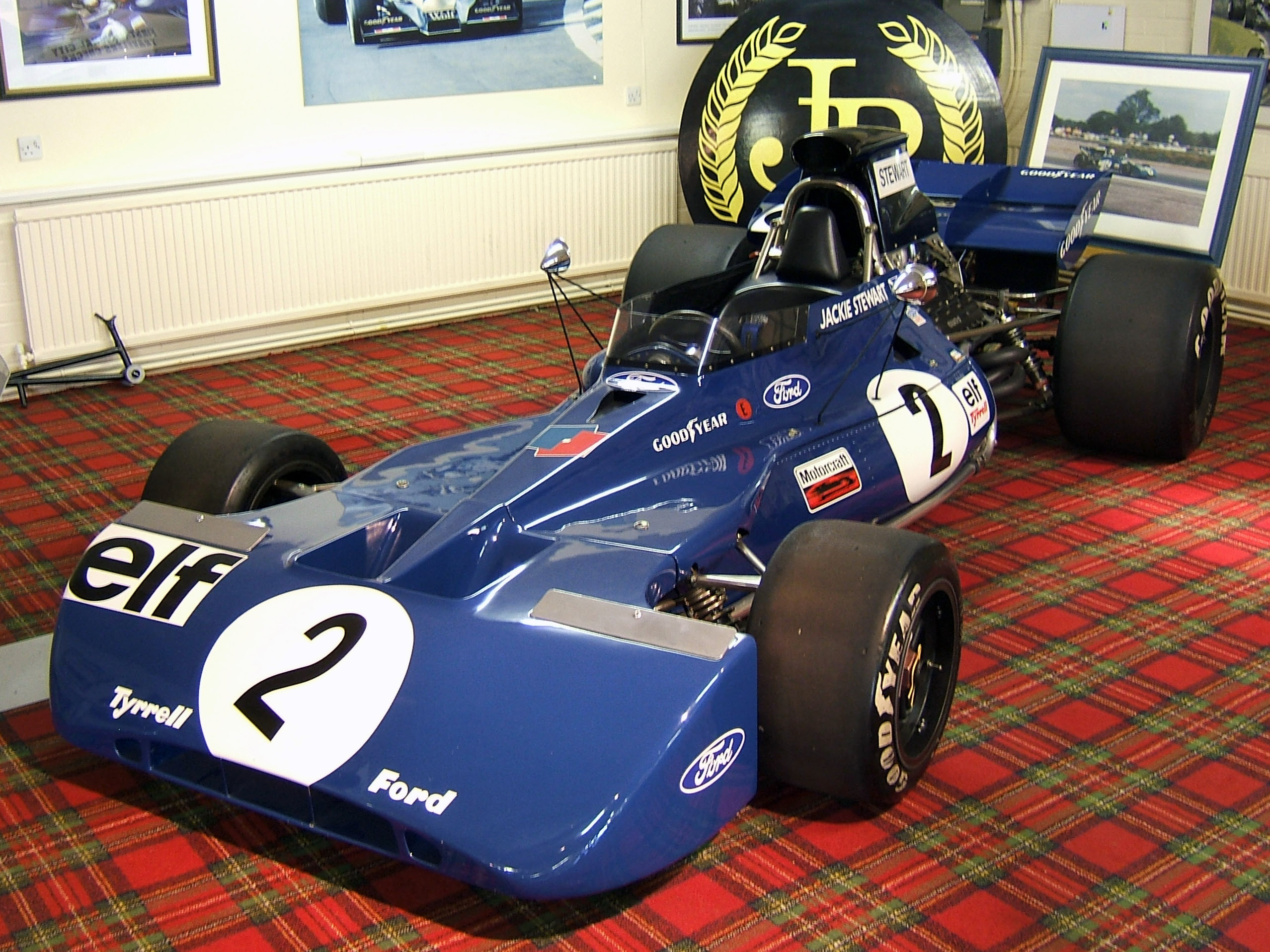
Jackie Stewart's Tyrrell 003

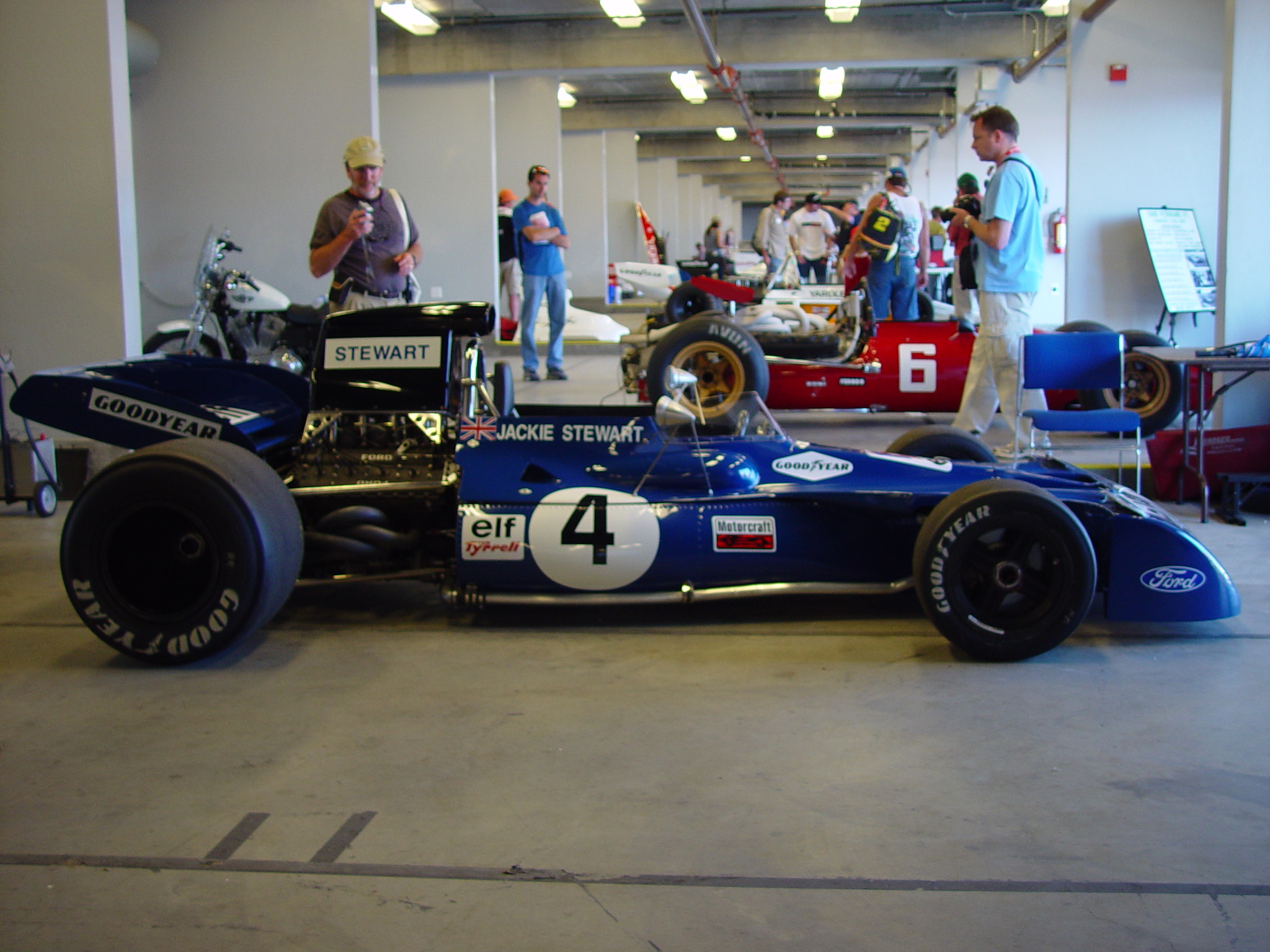
Jackie Stewart's 1972 Tyrrell 004 in display at Monterey Historic

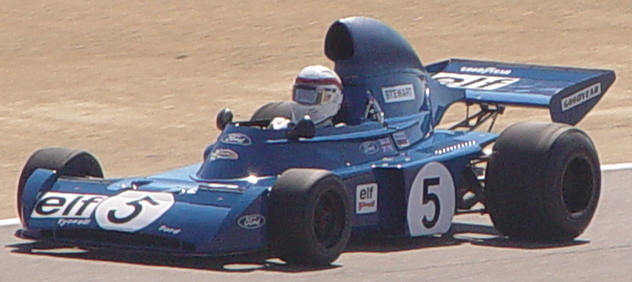
A Tyrrell 005 from the 1972 season being demonstrated at Monterey Historic

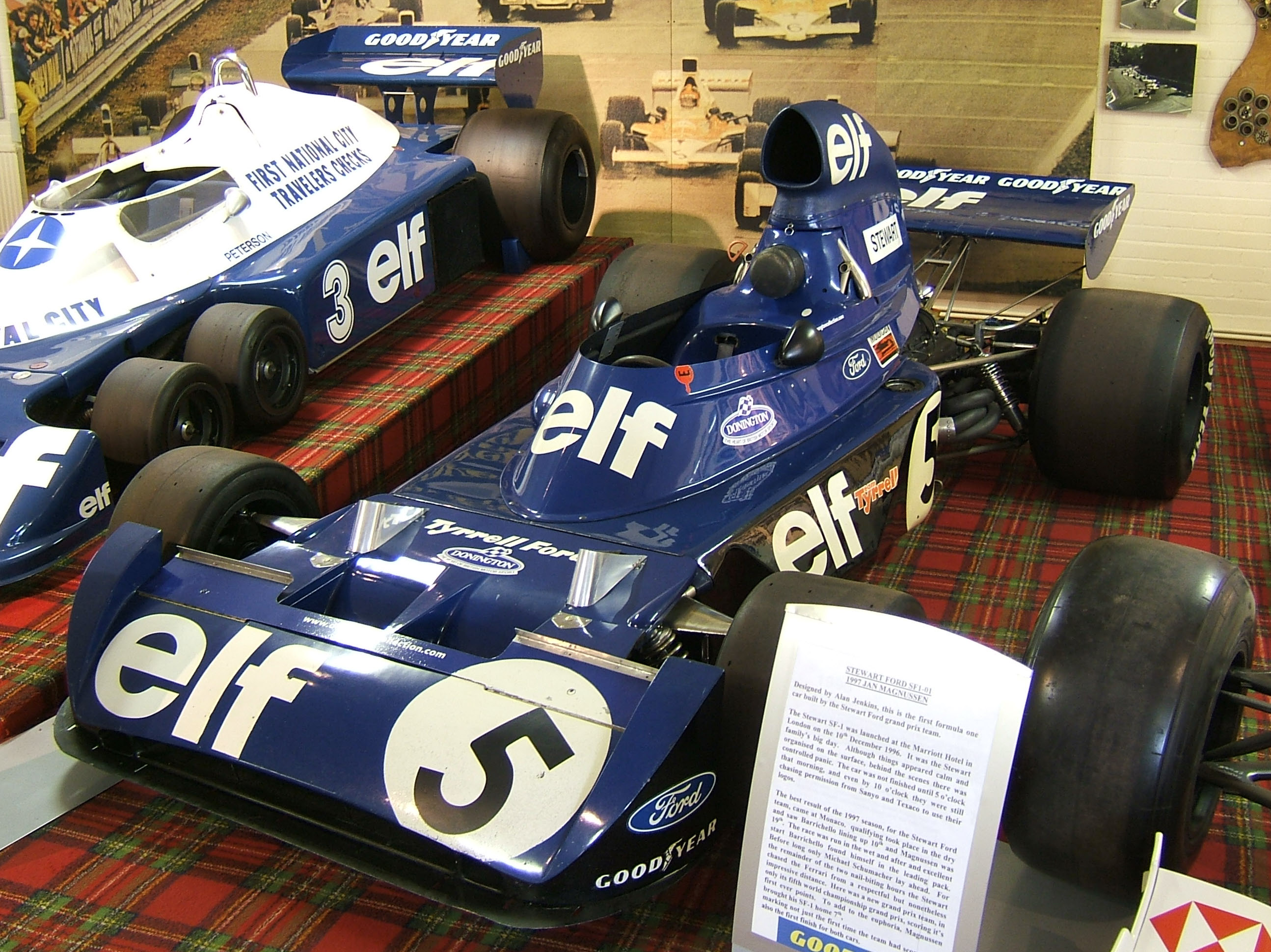
Jackie Stewart's final Grand Prix car, Tyrrell 006/2, resting on a carpet of Royal Stewart tartan in the Donington Grand Prix Collection.

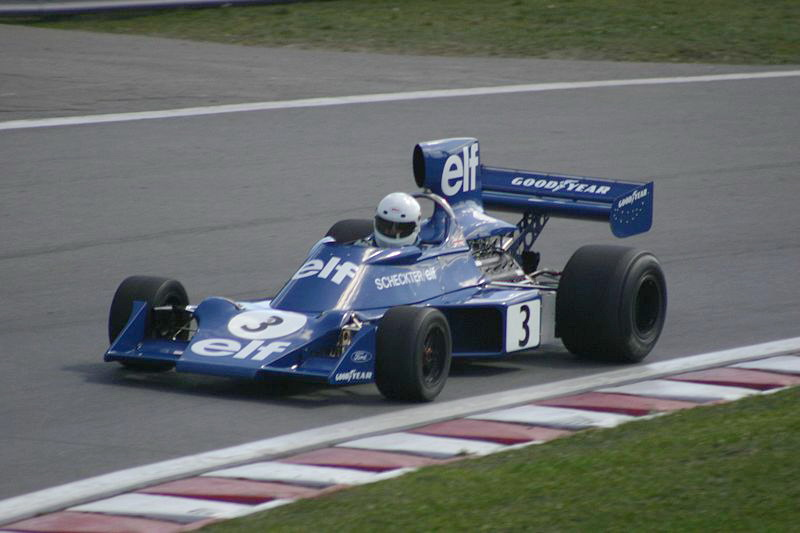
Jody Scheckter's 1974 Tyrrell 007 being demonstrated at the 2004 Canadian Grand Prix.

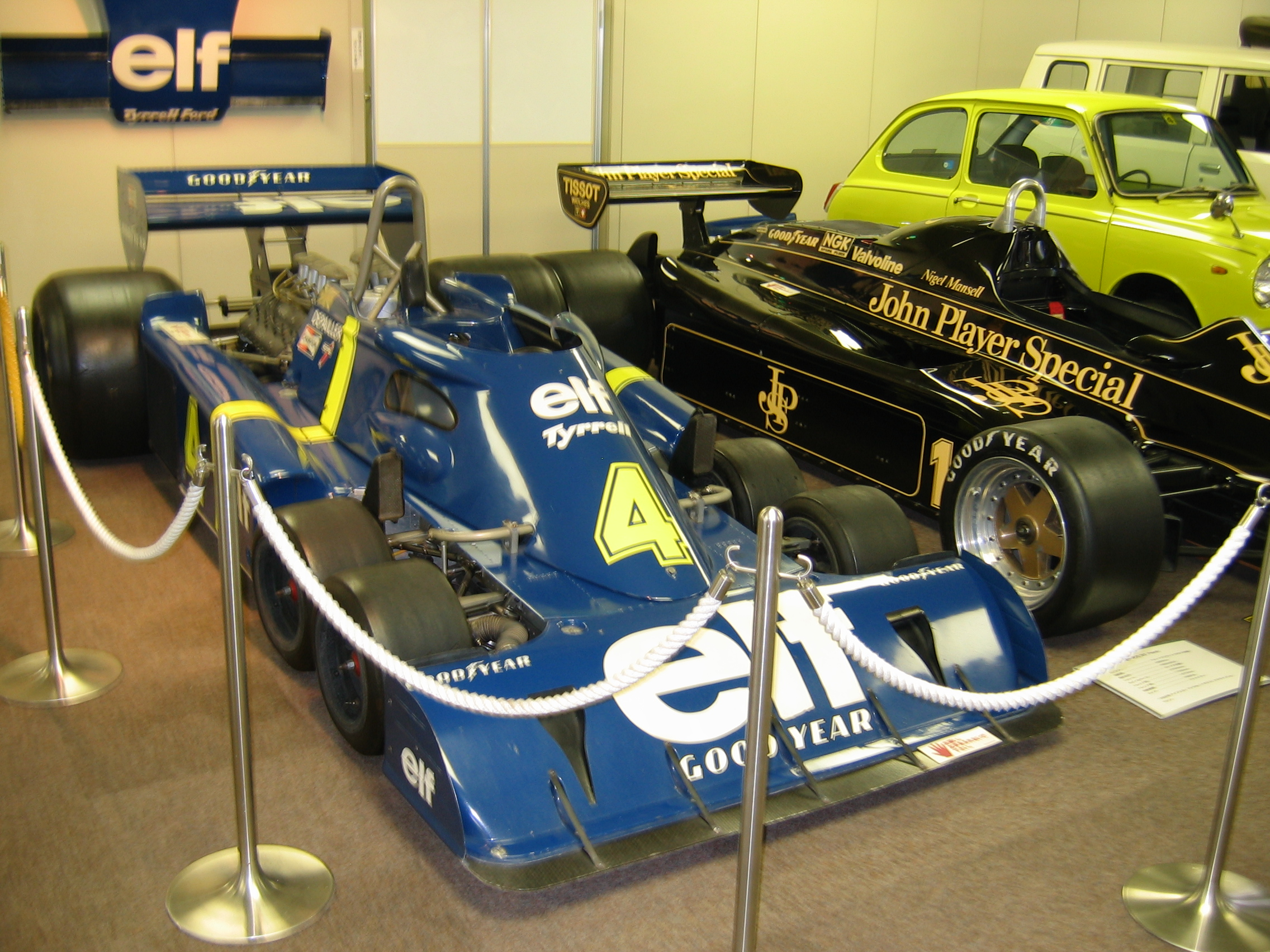
A Tyrrell P34 six-wheeler from the 1976 season at Tamiya's headquarters in Shizuoka City Japan. Tamiya purchased this car to study it for producing scale models likeness of this car.

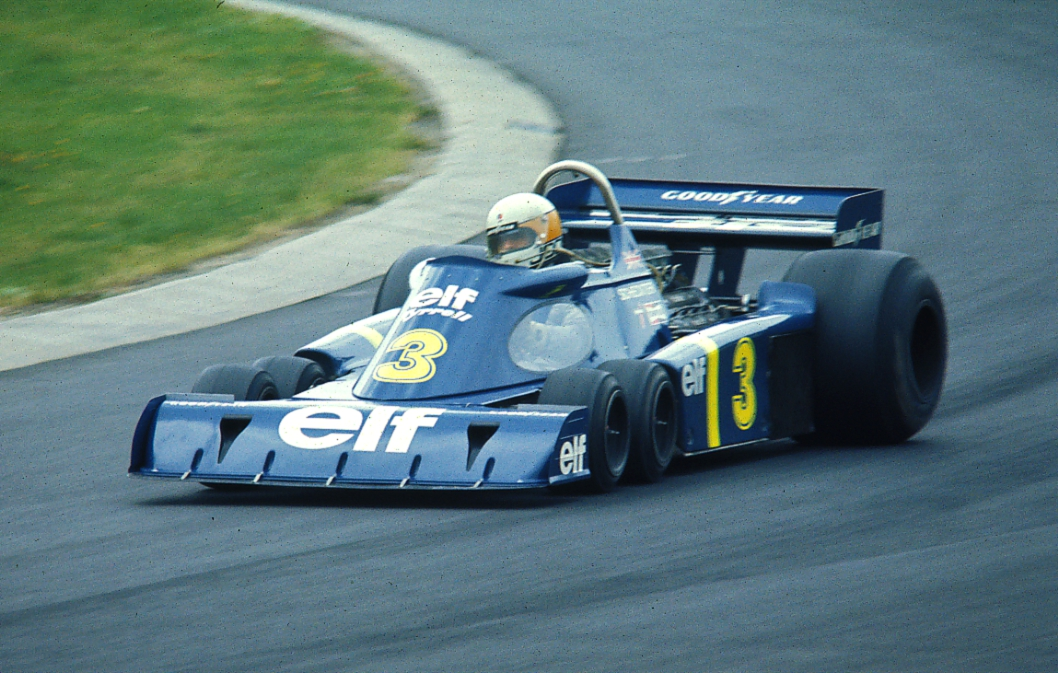
The Tyrrell P34 six-wheeler, driven by Jody Scheckter at the 1976 German Grand Prix, in blue Elf livery.

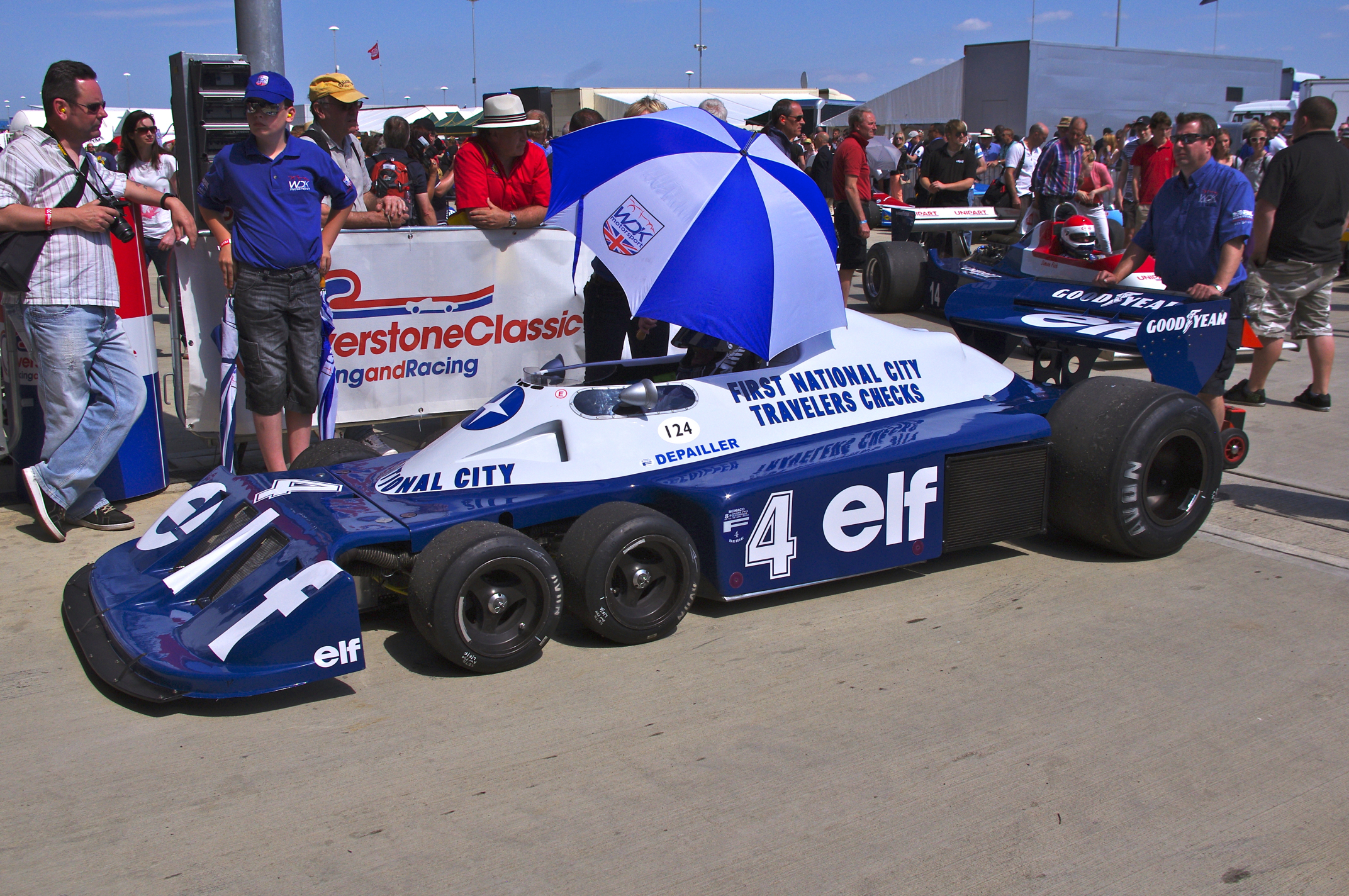
The Tyrrell P34 six-wheeler from 1977 season at Silverstone Classic in 2012

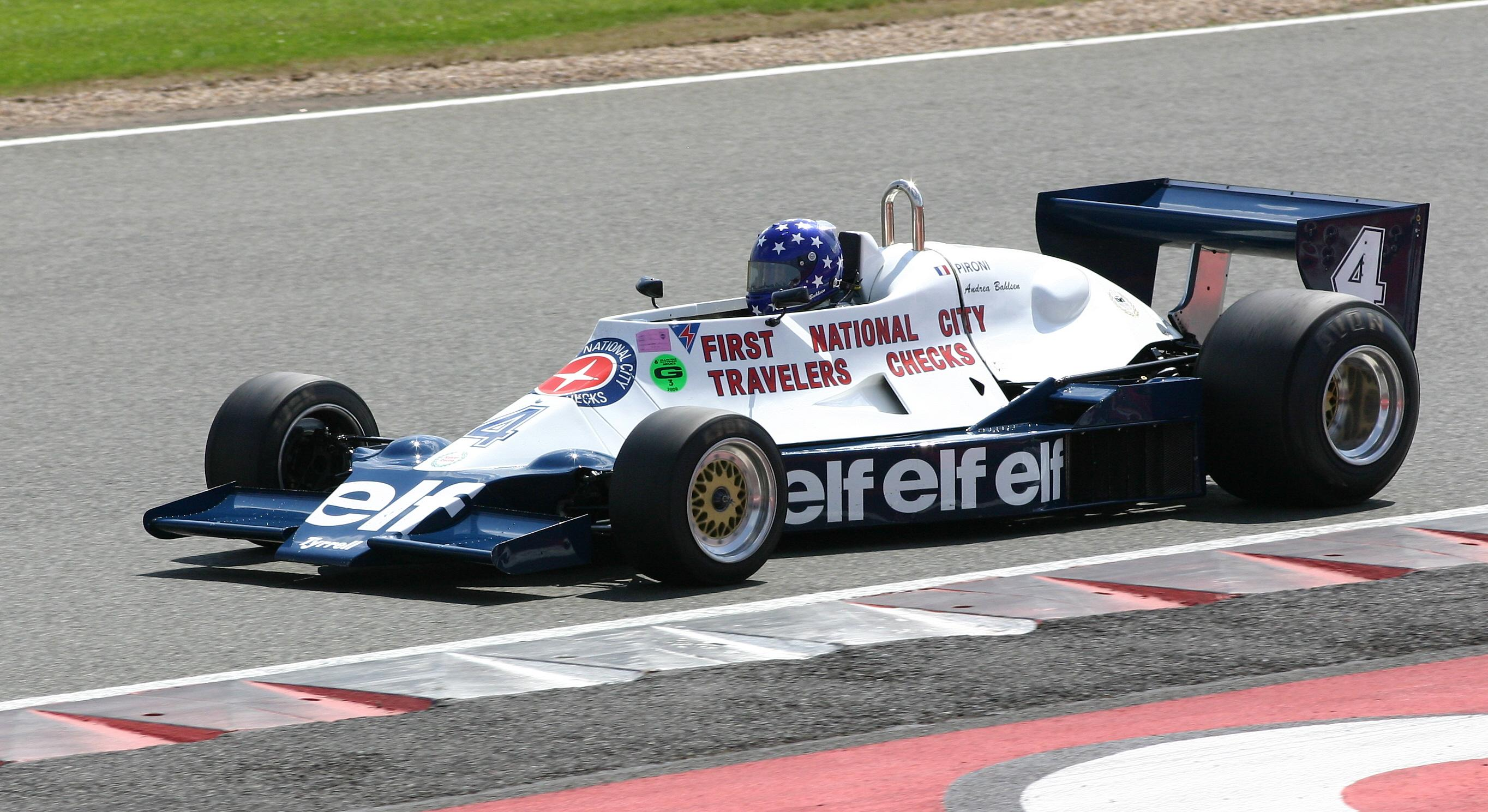
A Tyrrell 008 from the 1978 season at the 2008 Silverstone Classic race meeting.

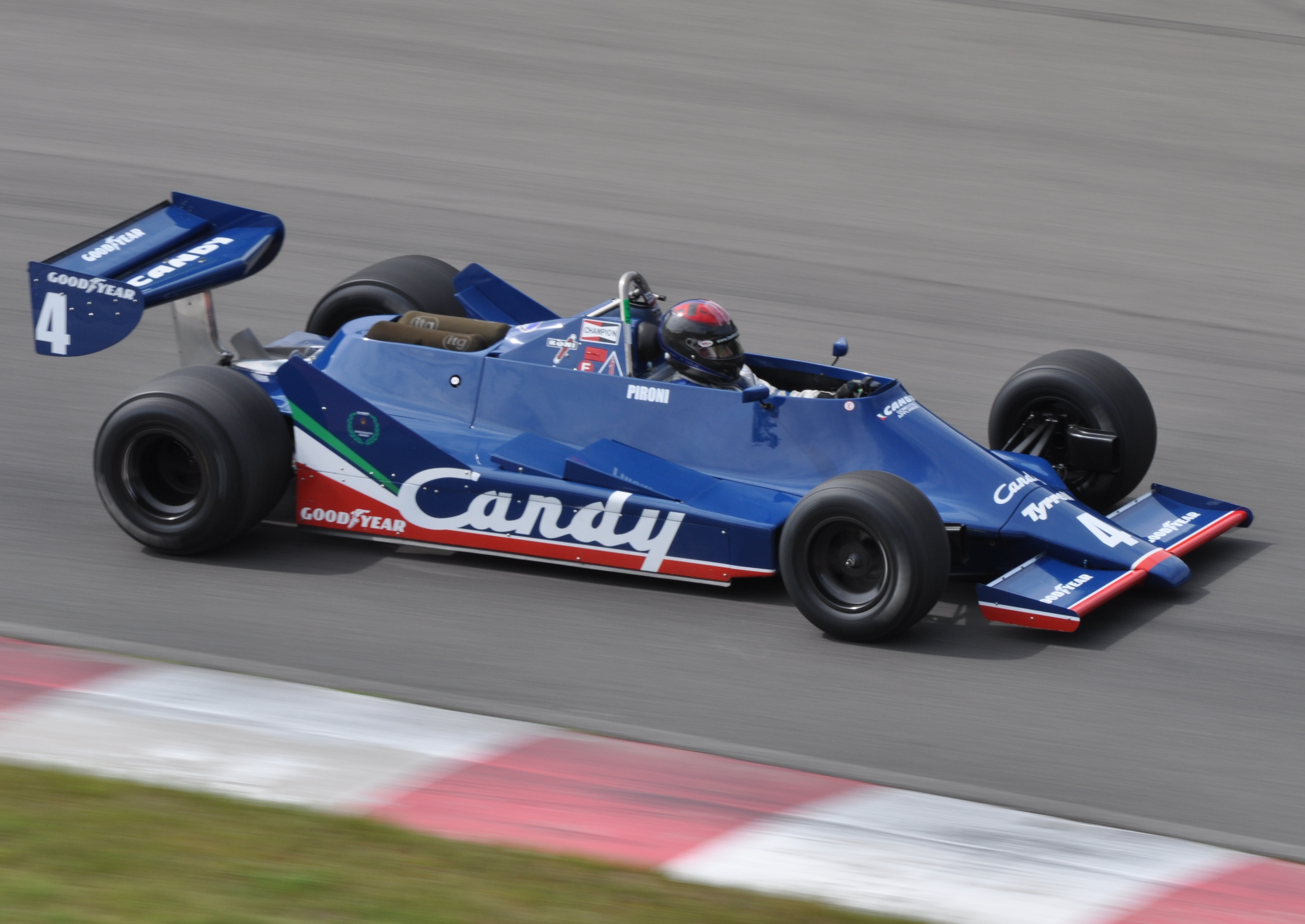
A Tyrrell 009 from the 1979 season being driven during the 2010 Legends of Motorsport meeting at Circuit Mont-Tremblant.

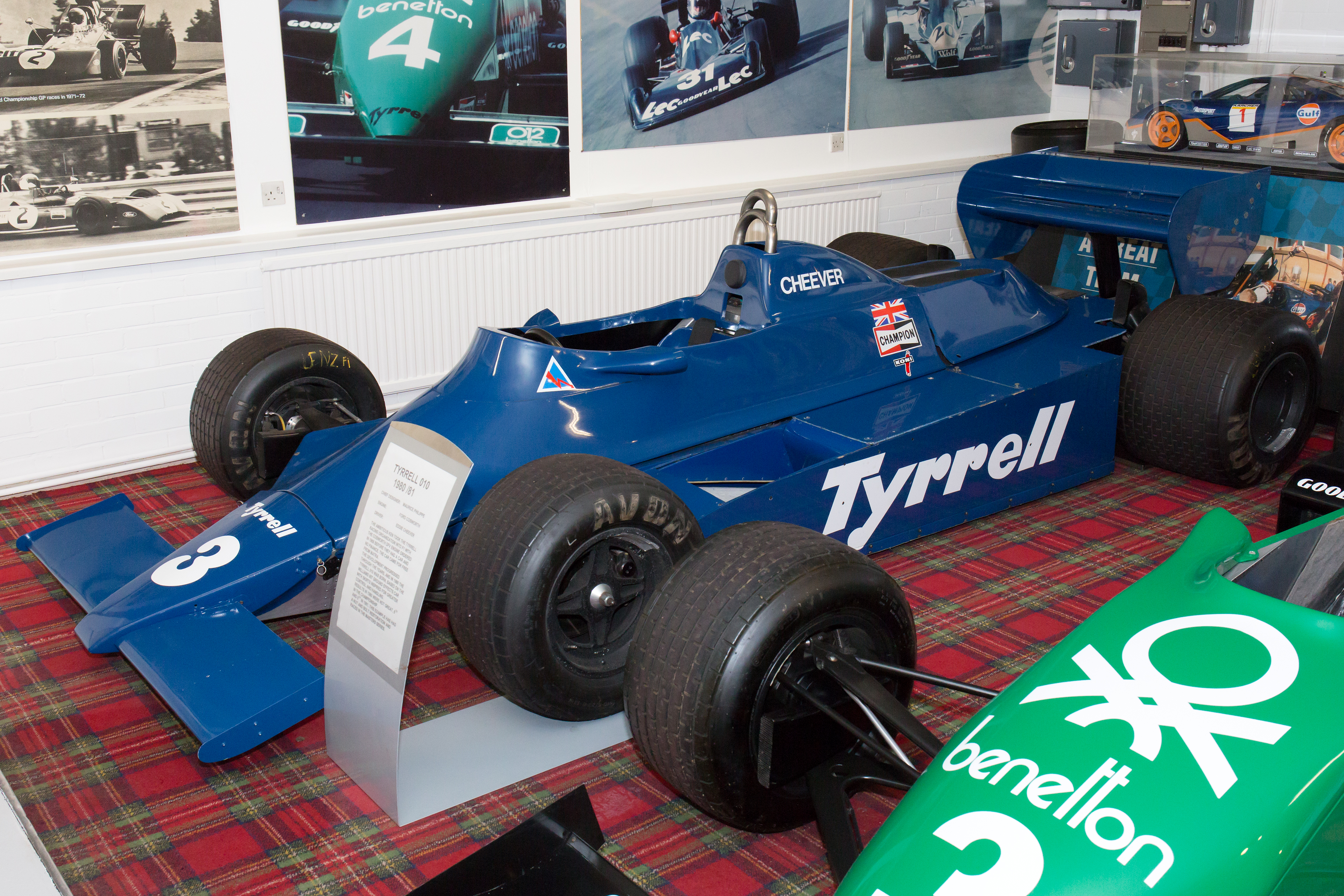
Eddie Cheever's 1980 Tyrrell 010 in display in the Donington Grand Prix Collection.

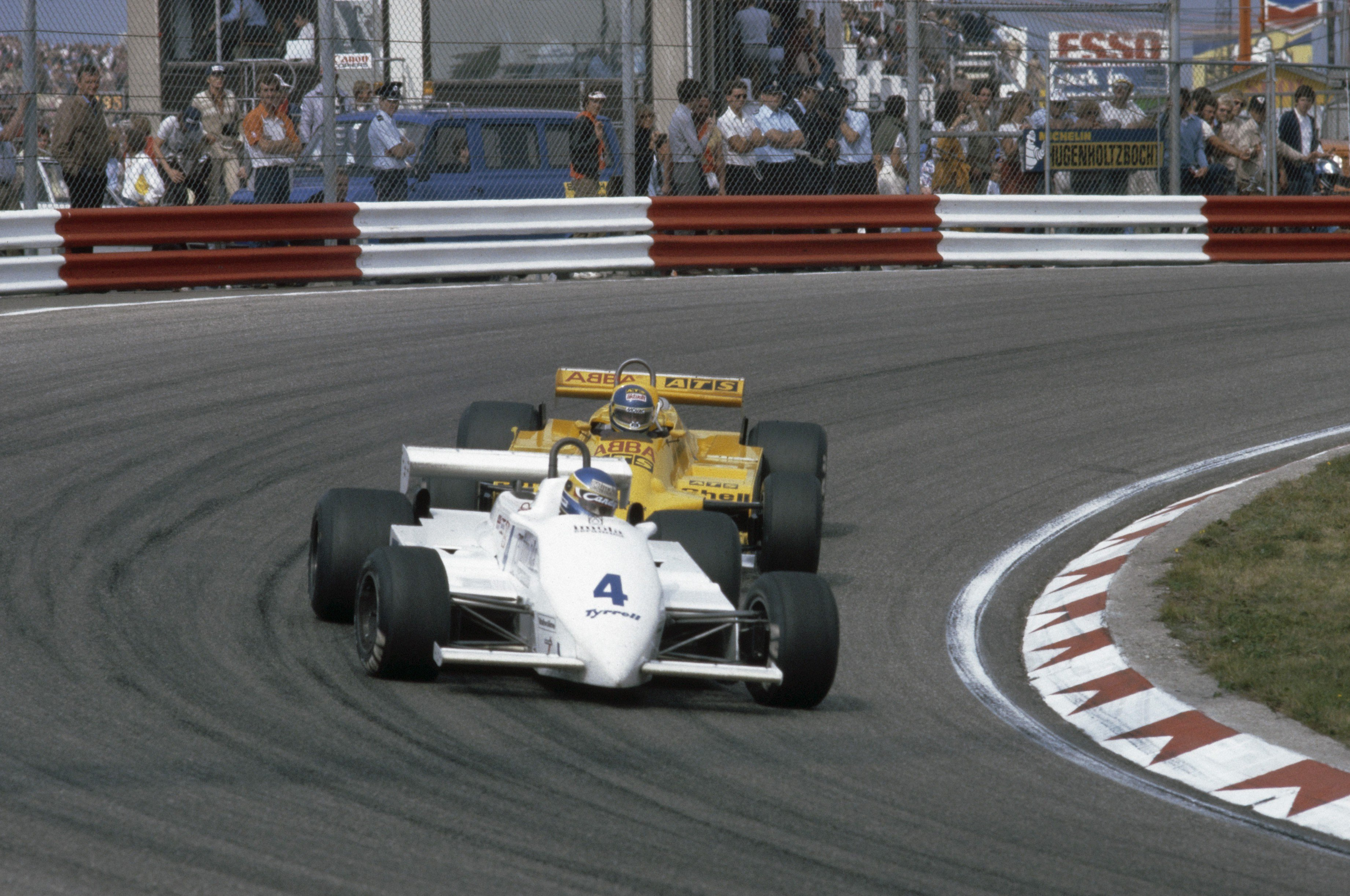
Michele Alboreto driving the Tyrrell 011 at the 1981 Dutch Grand Prix.

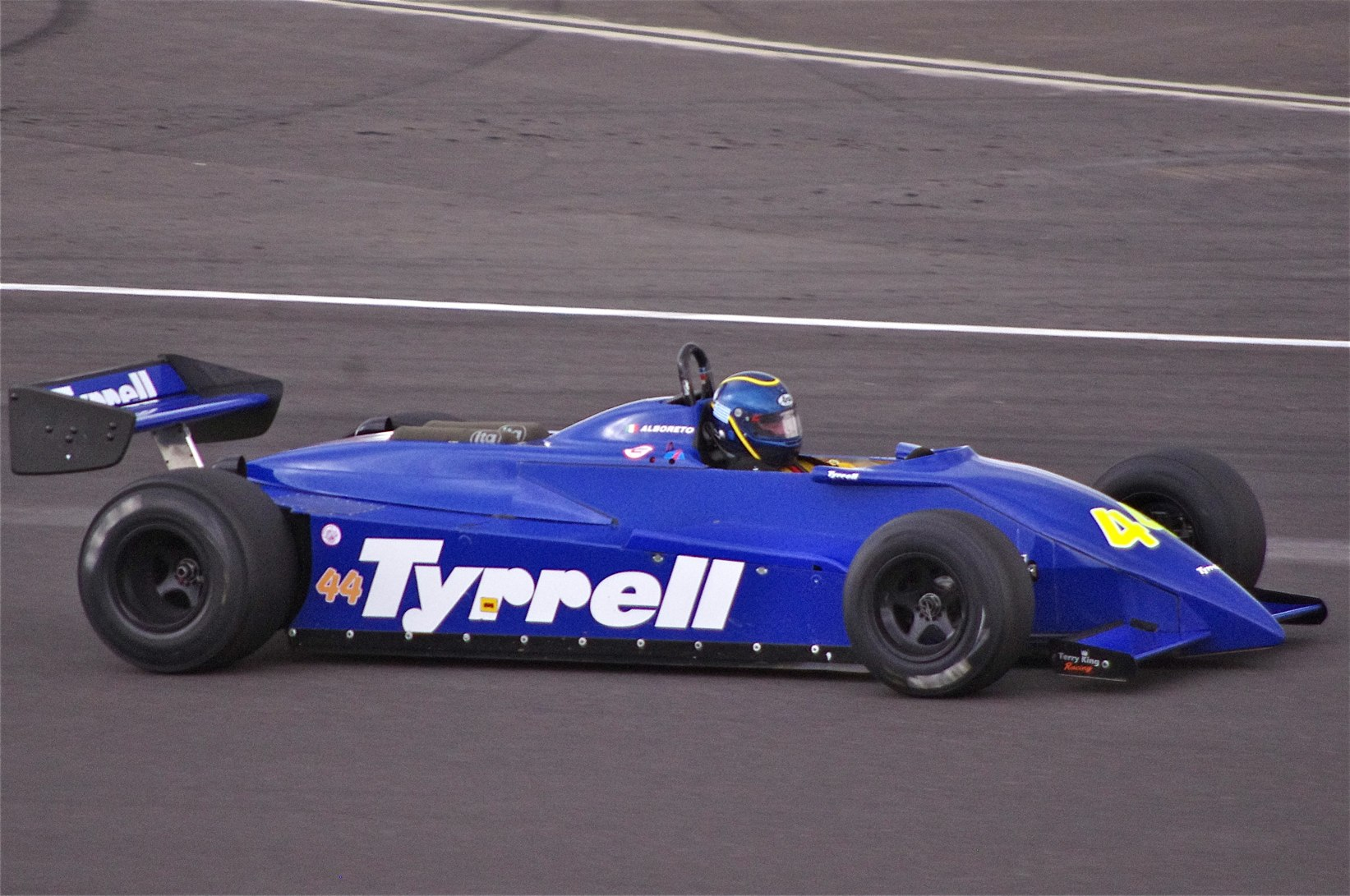
A Tyrrell 011 from 1982 on display.

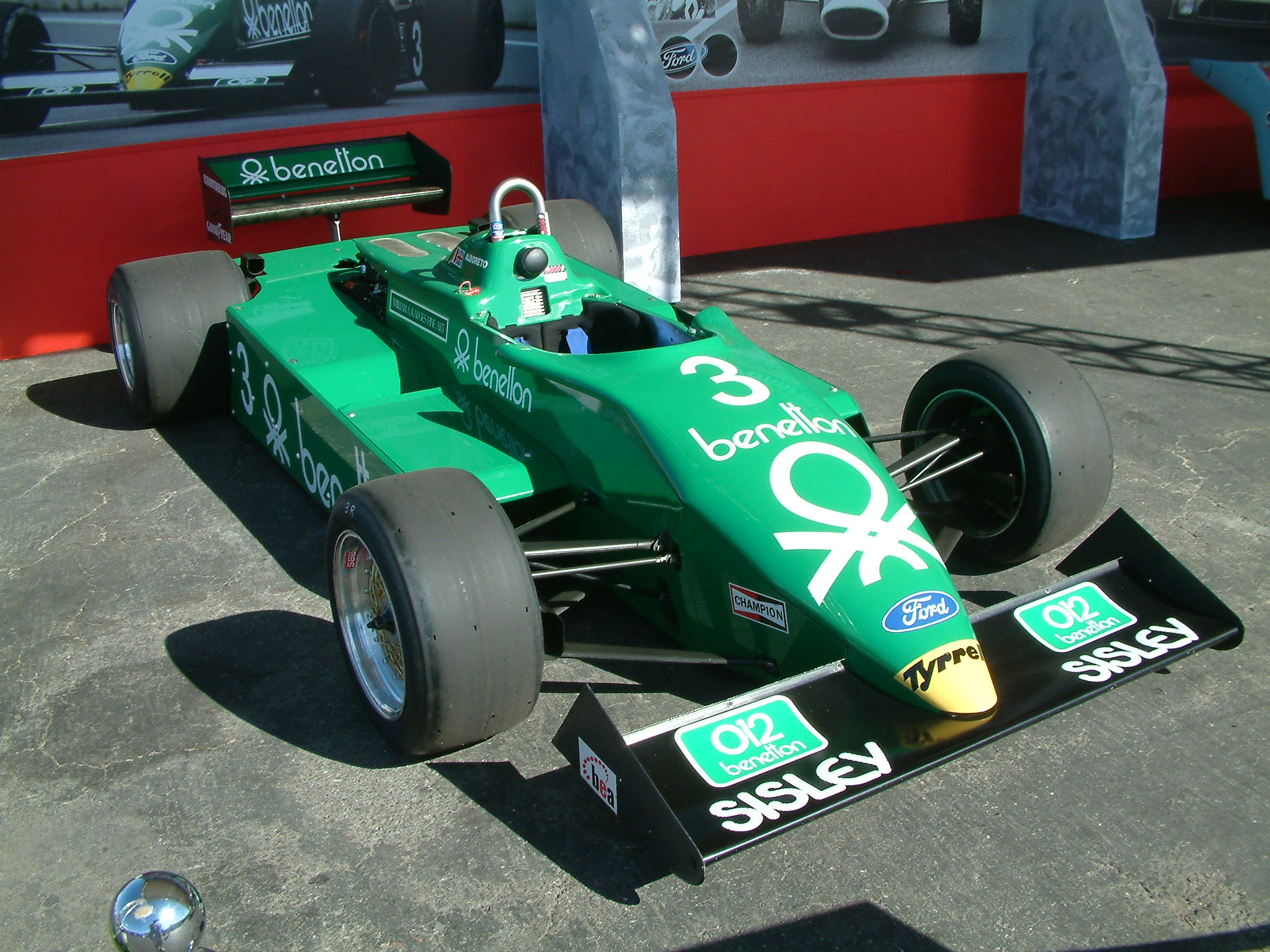
Michele Alboreto's Tyrrell 012 from 1983 on display

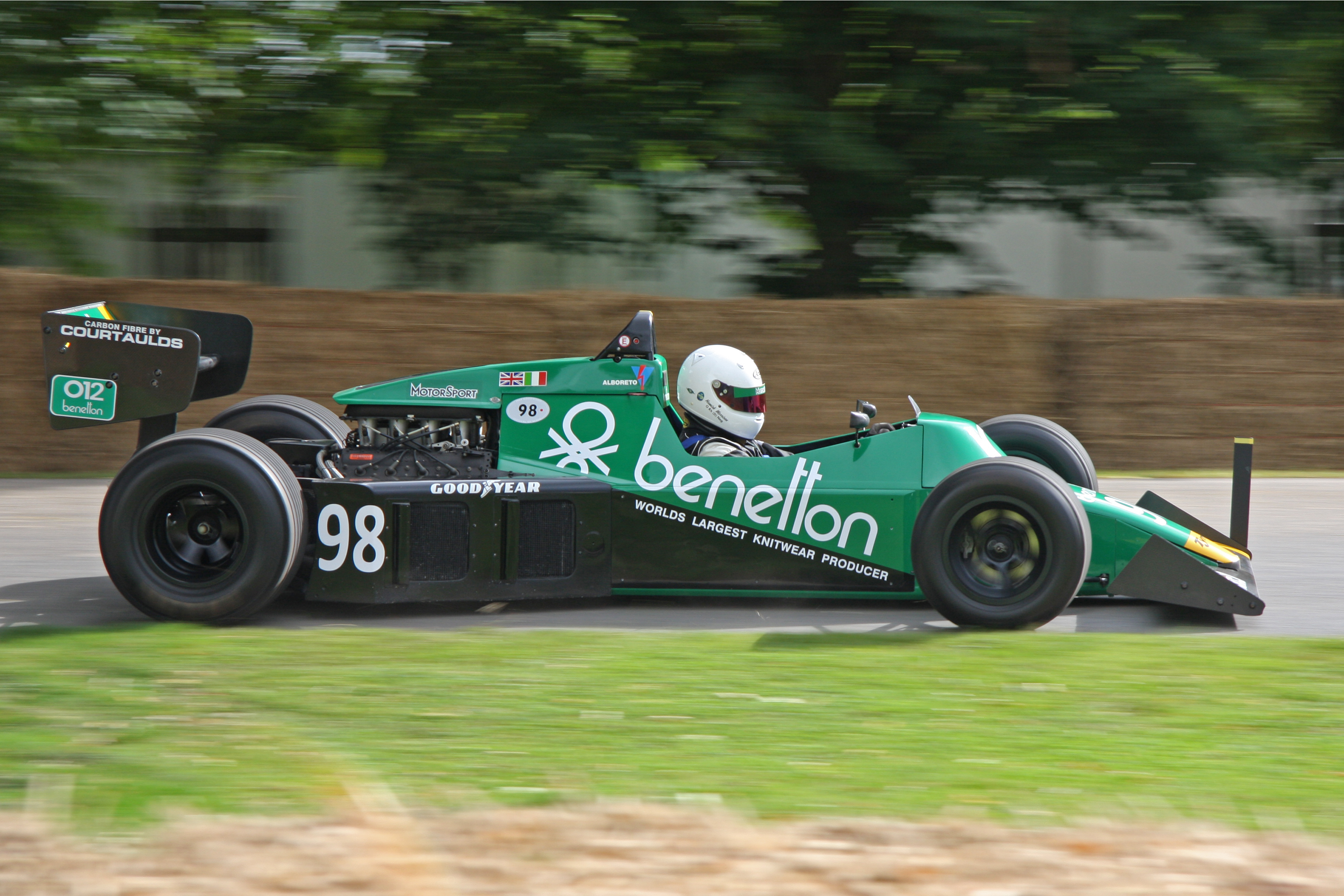
Tyrrell 012 painted in its Benetton livery of 1983

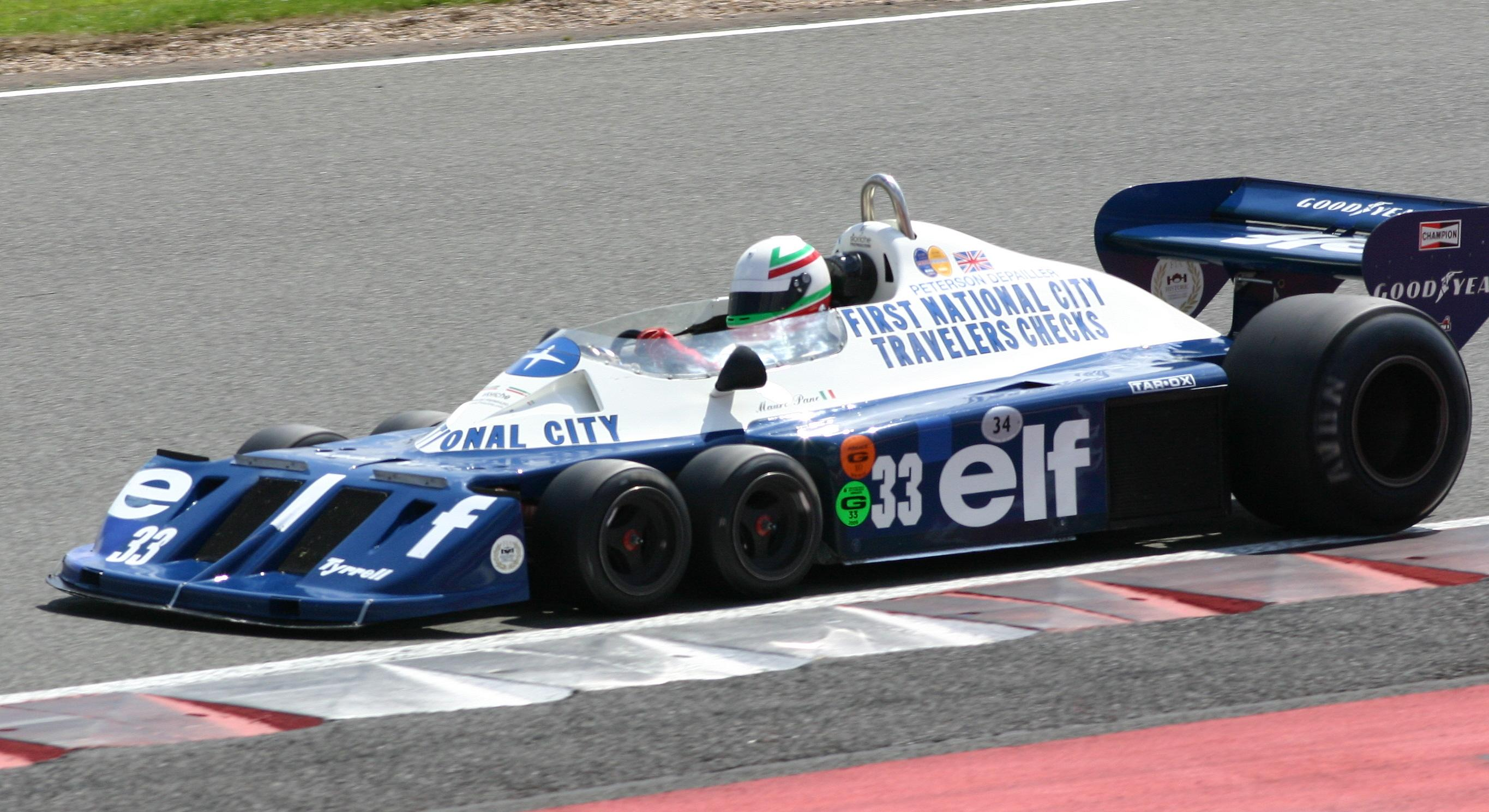
The Tyrrell P34 six-wheeler in its First National City Bank livery

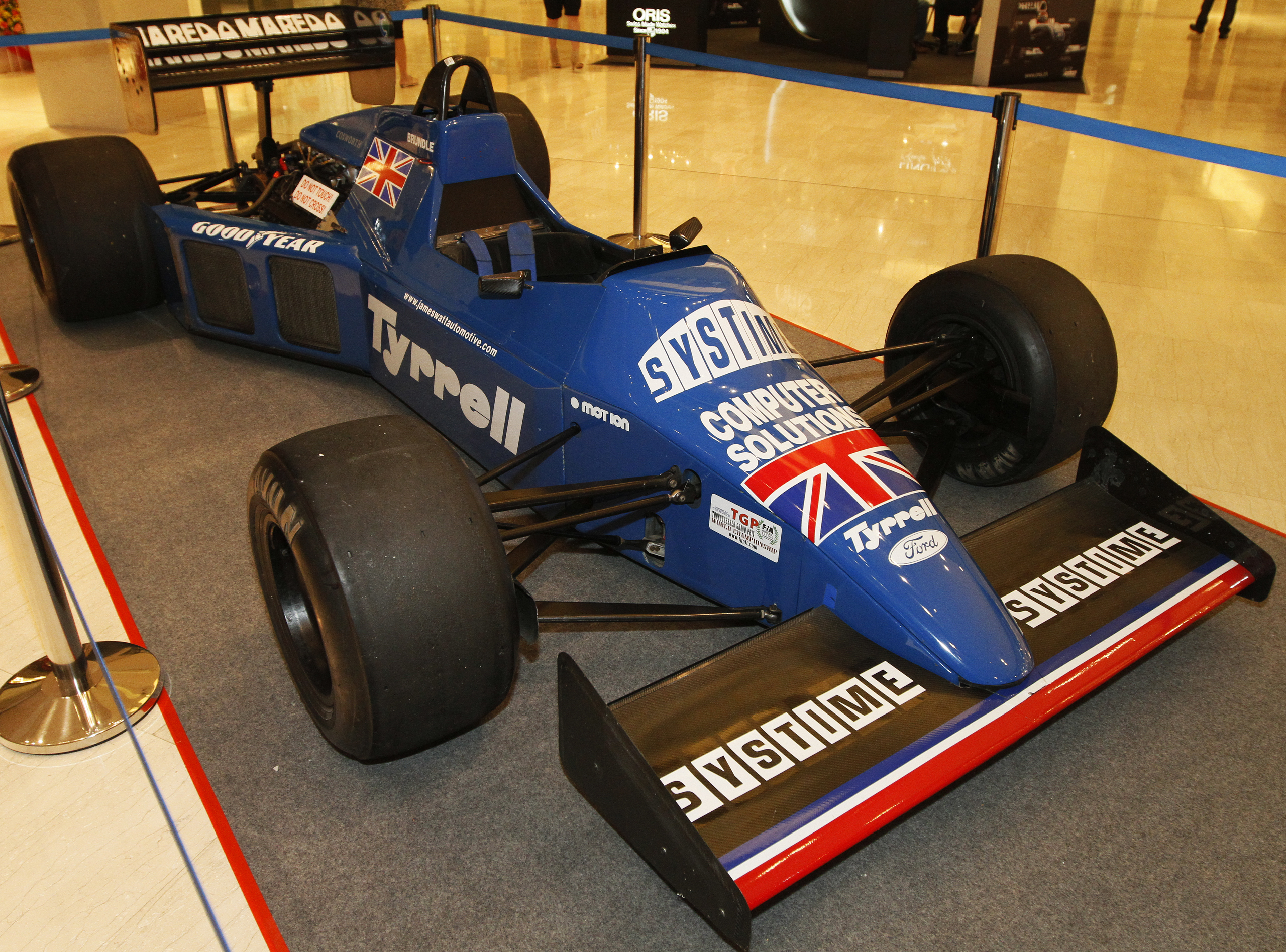
A Tyrrell 012 from 1984 with a Systime Livery

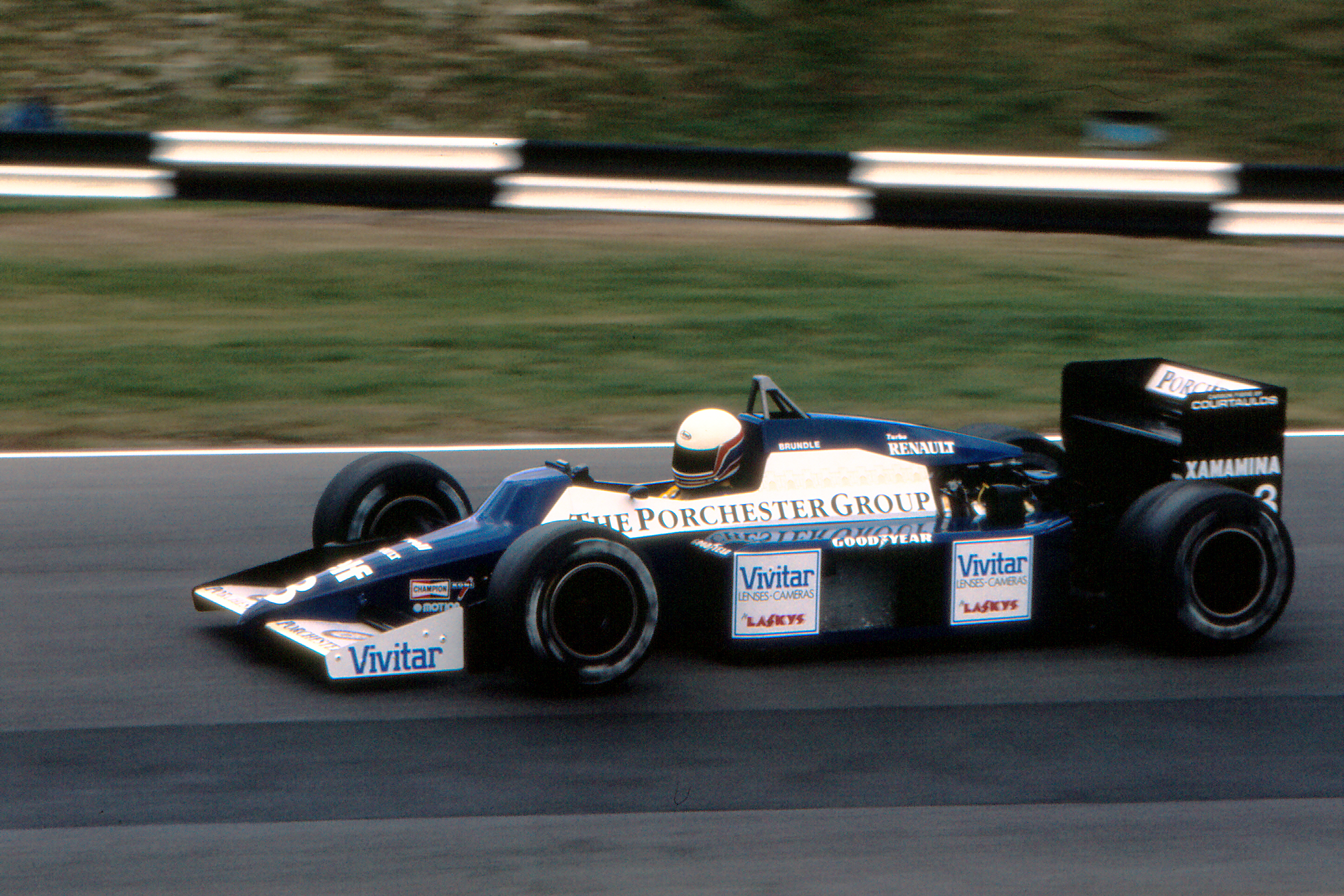
Martin Brundle driving a Tyrrell 015 during practice in the 1985 European Grand Prix

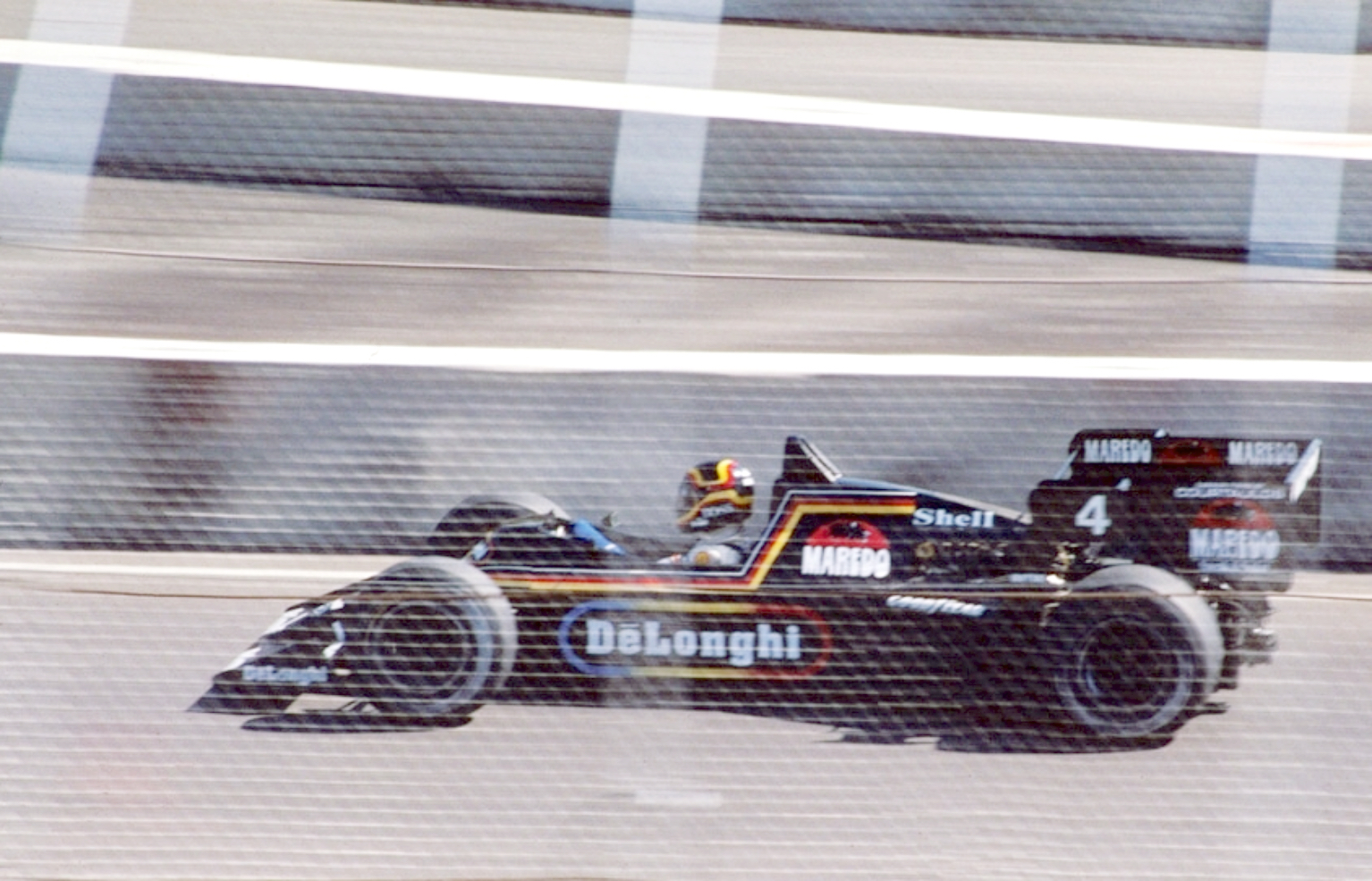
Stefan Bellof driving the Tyrrell 012 at the 1984 Dallas Grand Prix with a DeLonghi livery. When Bellof and Martin Brundle were Tyrrell teammates in 1984, their cars had different liveries.

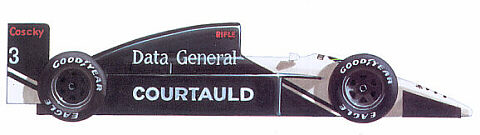
A Tyrrell 016 from 1987 season

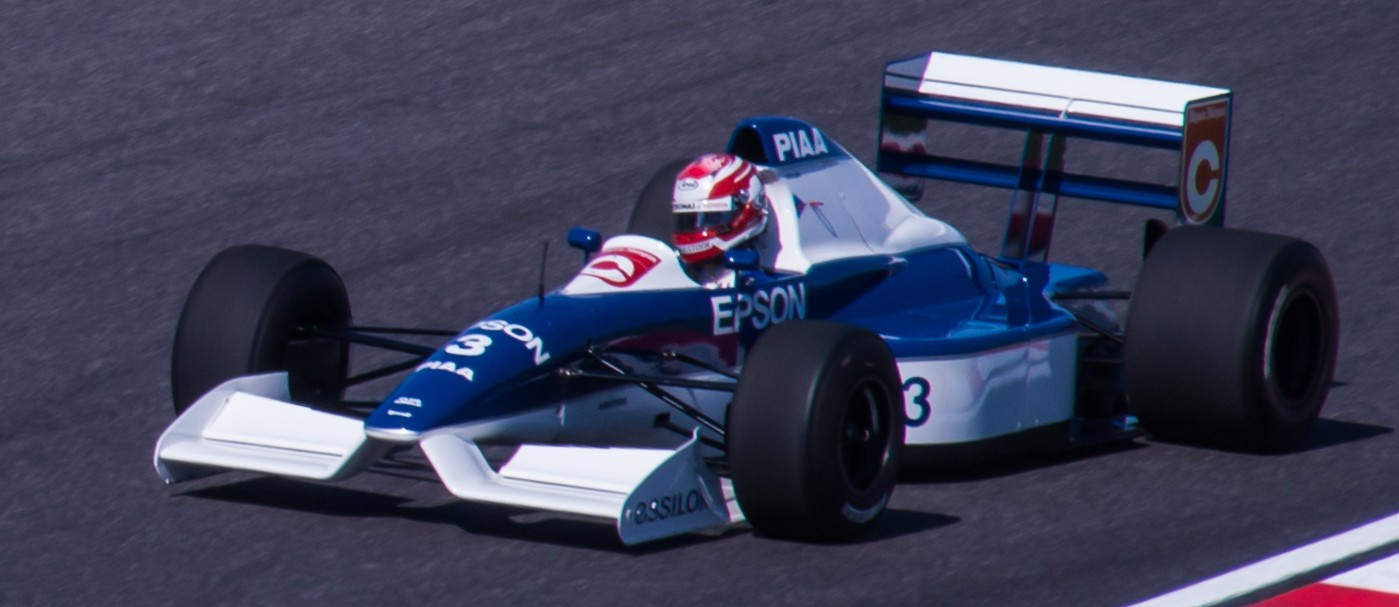
Kazuki Nakajima driving his father's 1990 Tyrrell 019.

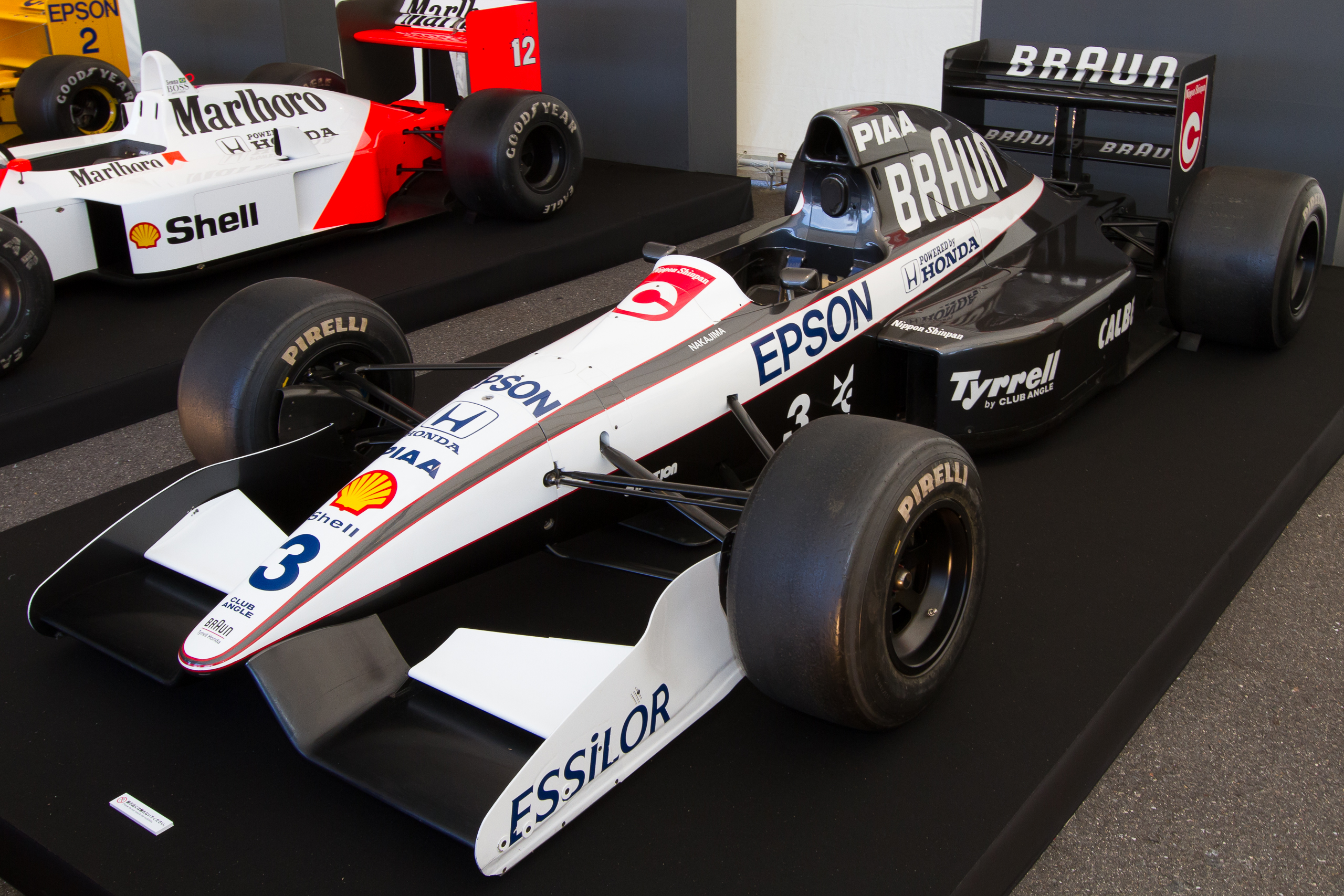
A Tyrrell from 1991 season

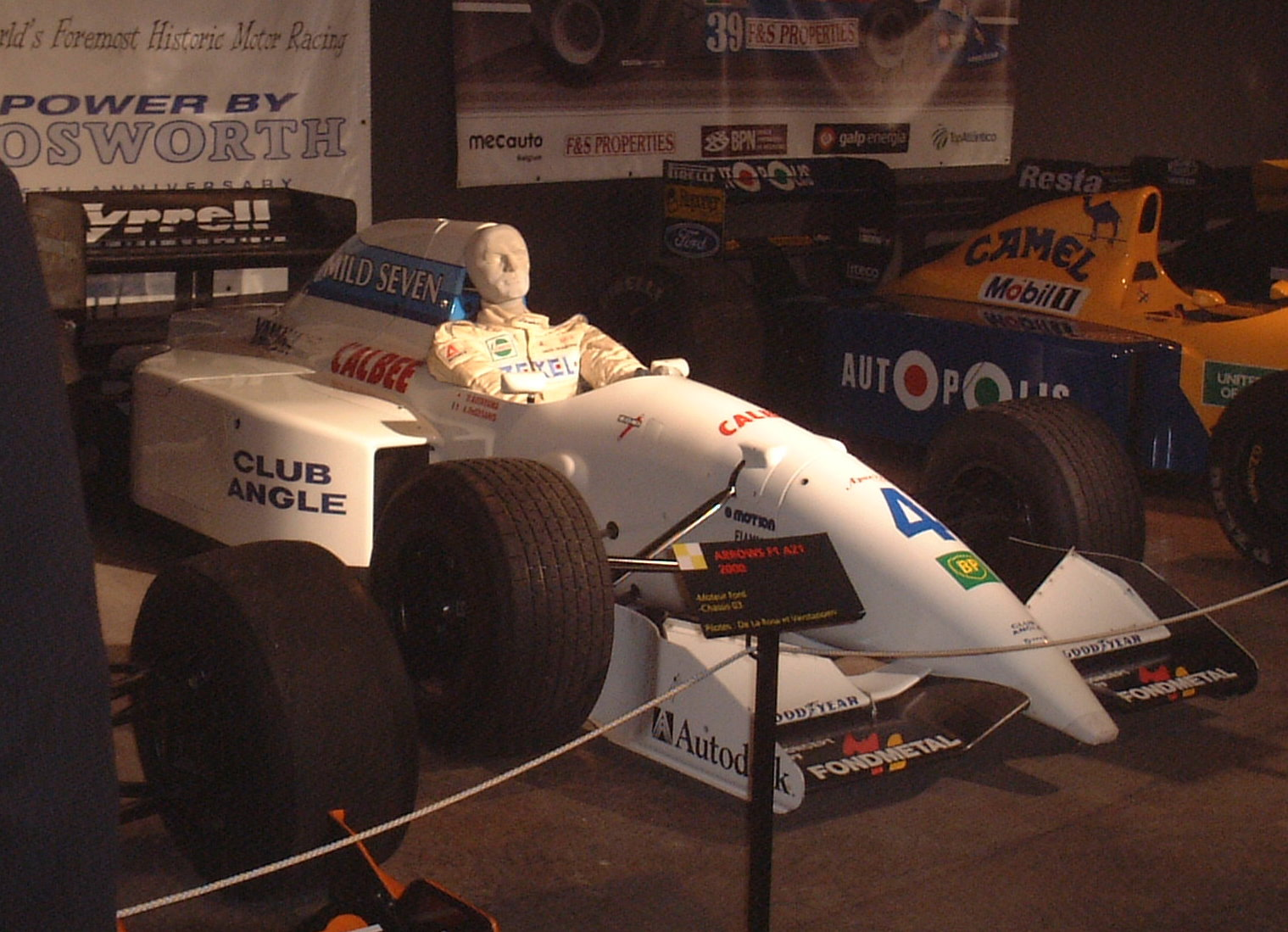
A Tyrrell from 1993 season painted in Mild Seven livery

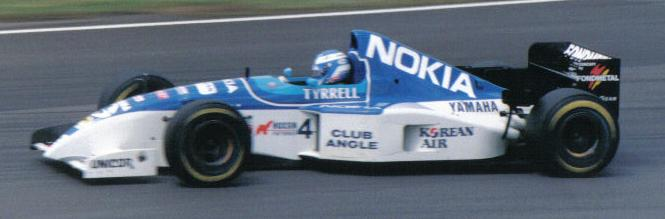
Mika Salo driving the Tyrrell 023 at the 1995 British Grand Prix

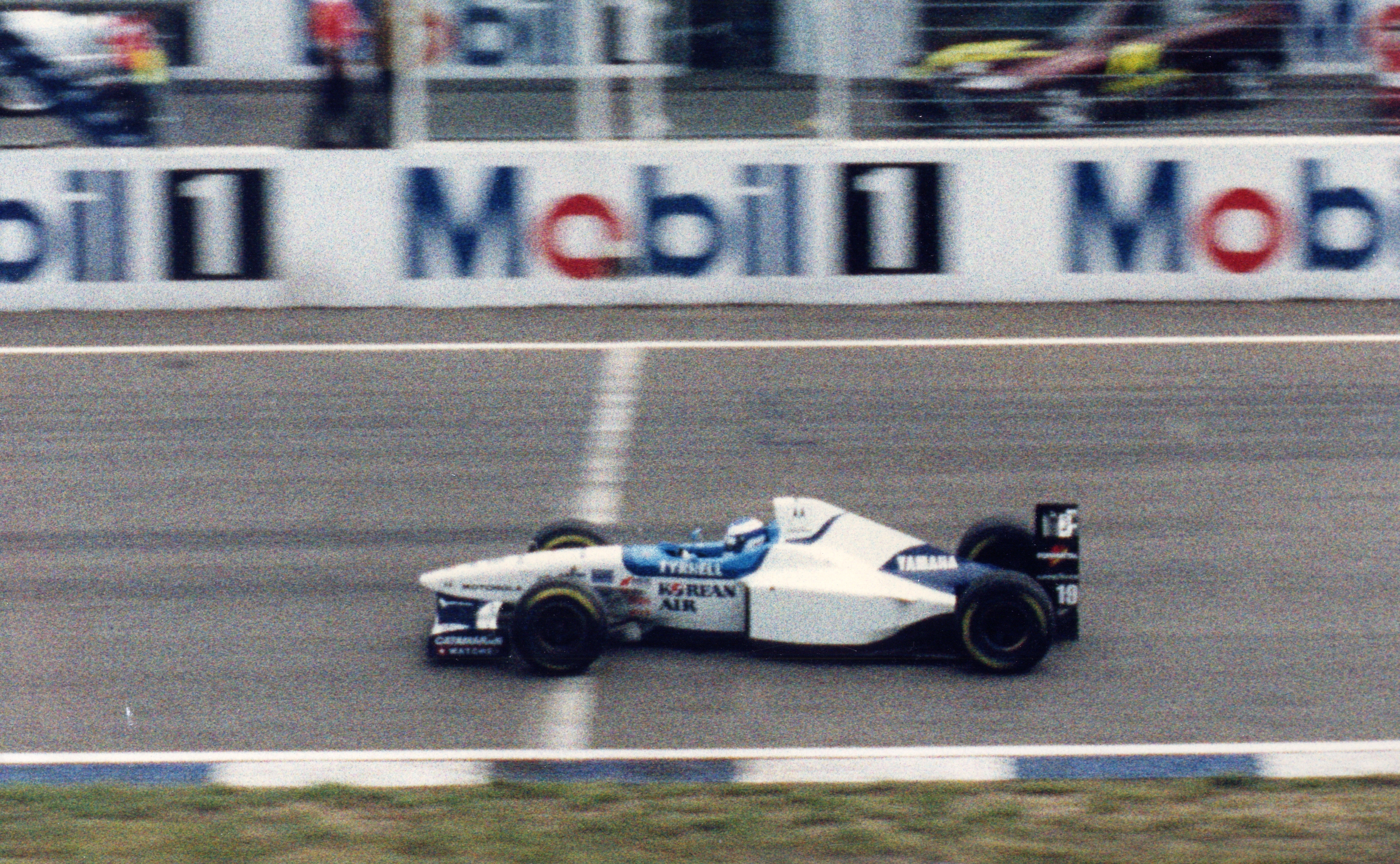
Mika Salo driving a Tyrrell 024 in 1996

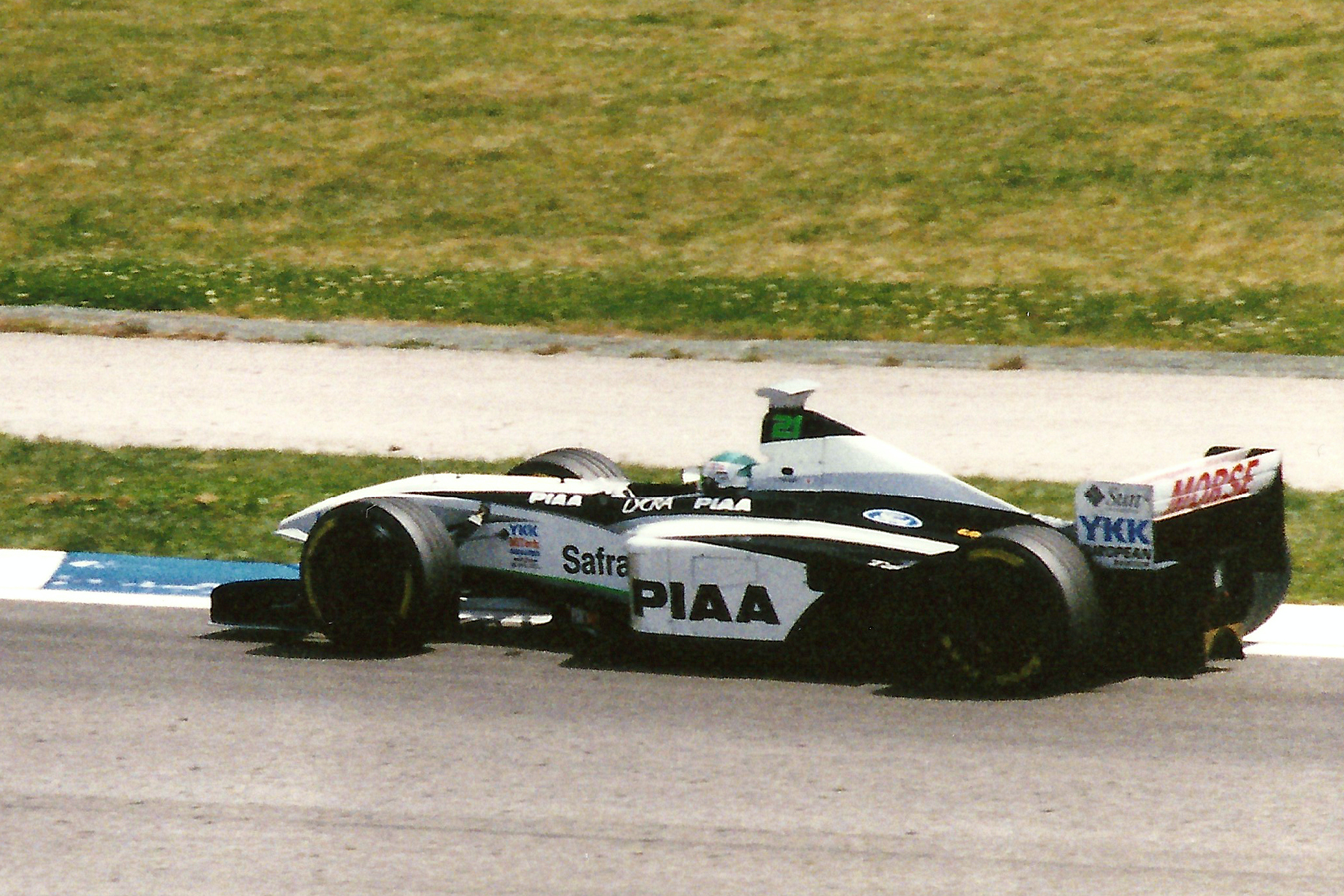
Tyrrell had PIAA Corporation sponsorship in 1997 and 1998. This is Toranosuke Takagi driving the Tyrrell 026 at the 1998 Spanish Grand Prix.

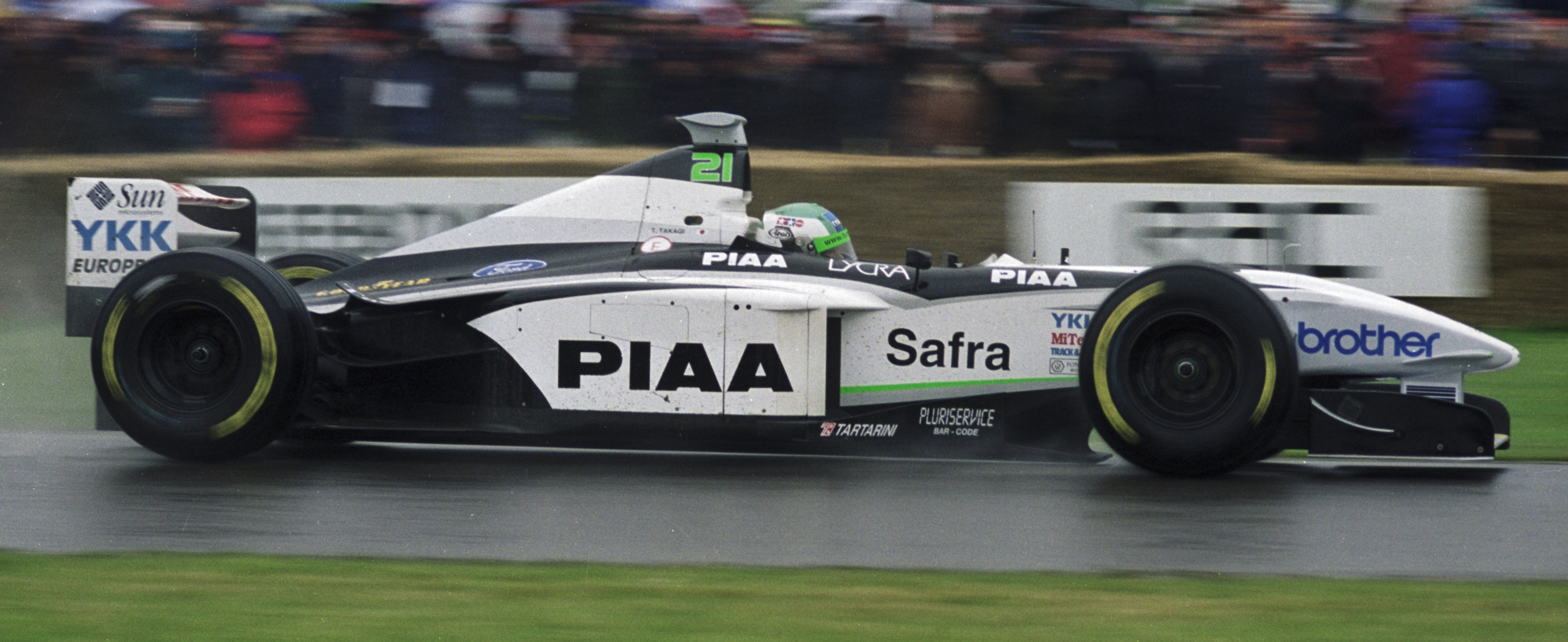
The Tyrrell 026 being driven at the Goodwood Festival of Speed.

== Virgin ==
The Virgin Group's involvement with Formula One started in 2009 when they decided to sponsor Brawn GP for that season. On 30 November 2009 it was reported that the Manor GP, one of the four newcomers teams for the 2010 season, would be rebranded as Virgin Racing.

Year	Main colour(s)	Additional colour(s)	Livery sponsor(s)	Additional major sponsor(s)	Special liveries
2010	Black, Red	White	Virgin	FxPro, Marussia, Oxigen Investment, Bridgestone, Clear, Carbon Green, UST Global, Full Tilt Poker.Com, St. Tropez, Wirth Research	
2011	Black, Red	White	Marussia, Virgin	QNET, Quantel, UST Global, CSC, Quick, LDC, Kappa, Armin, CNBC, Wirth Research, Pirelli, Ring Automotive	The team supported movies Cars 2 at the 2011 British Grand Prix respectively.

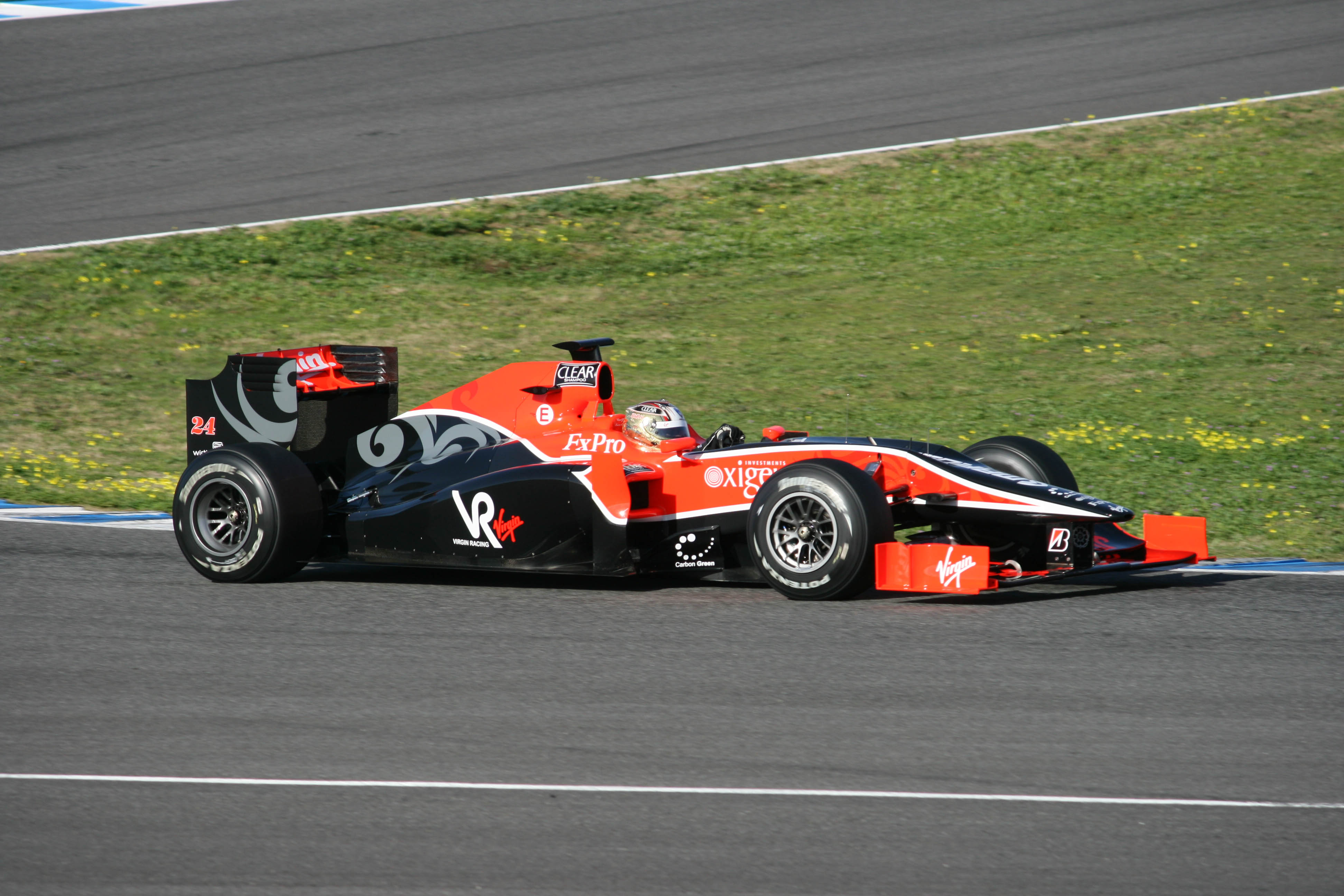
Timo Glock testing the Virgin VR-01 during pre-season testing in Jerez, February 2010.

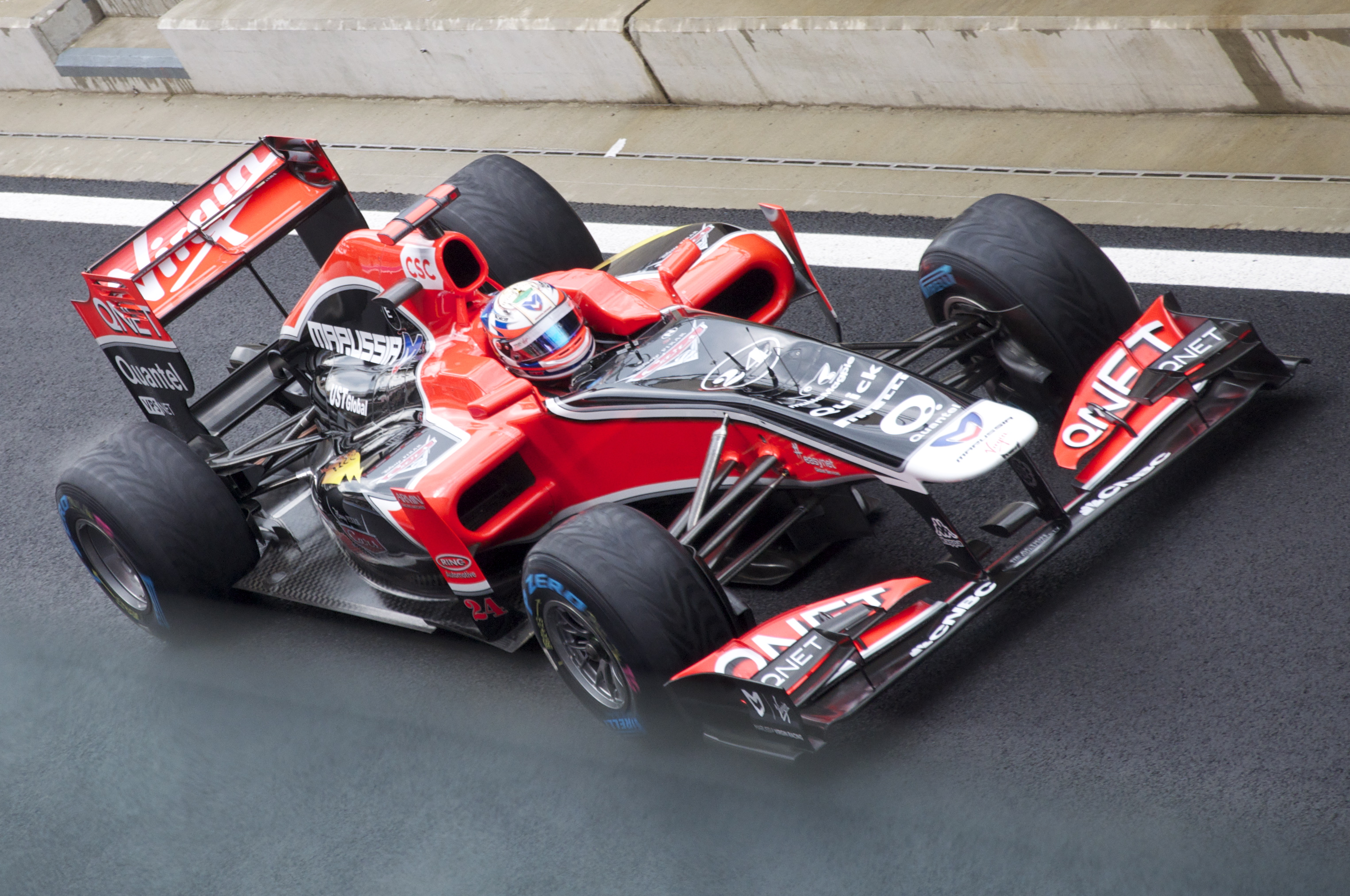
Timo Glock driving the Virgin MVR-02 at the 2011 British Grand Prix.

== Williams ==
Williams, as a major constructor, is rare in modern F1 in that they have no manufacturer backing. Over the years, the supply of engines and other major components has often changed, meaning that their livery is renewed more often than most of their rivals. The BMW-engined Williams cars from 2000 to 2005 featured a dark blue and white scheme.

Year	Main colour(s)	Additional colour(s)	Livery sponsor(s)	Additional major sponsor(s)	Non-tobacco/alcohol livery changes
1977	Red and White		Belle-Vue, Saudia	ABMTM, Assubel, Castrol, Champion, Goodyear, Personal, Texaco	
1978	White	Green and Black	Saudia	ABMTM, Albilad, Champion, City of Riyadh, Fruit of the Loom, Goodyear, Personal	
1979	White	Green	Albilad, Saudia	Baroom, Binladen, Champion, Dallah Avco, Encotrade, Goodyear, Kanoo, M&M, Mobil, TAG	
1980	White	Green	Leyland, Saudia	Albilad, Canadair Challenger, Dallah Avco, Goodyear, Kanoo, M&M, Mobil, SIYANCO, TAG Challenger	
1981	White	Green	Leyland, Saudia, TAG	Albilad, Dallah Avco, Goodyear, Michelin, Mobil, SIYANCO	
1982	White	Green	Saudia, TAG	Albilad, Austin Rover, Goodyear, Mobil, Petromin	
1983	White	Green and Black	Denim, TAG	Albilad, Austin Rover, Fila, Goodyear, ICI Record, Miti Tessuti, Mobil, Petromin, Saudi Kingdom, Save the Children,	
1984	White	Yellow and Green	Denim	ICI, Saudia, Mobil 1, TAG, Honda, Goodyear, NGK, Austin Rover, Koni	
1985–1989	White	Yellow and Blue	Canon	ICI, Tactel, Honda (1985–1987), Renault (1989), Barclay (1989), Denim, Goodyear, Austin Rover, Saudia, Mobil 1 (1985–1988), Elf (1989)	Barclay replaced by driver's surname in races not allowing alcohol or tobacco sponsors
1990	Blue and Yellow	White	Canon	Elf, Labatt's, Magneti Marelli, Goodyear, ICI, Tactel, Renault, Denim, Victrex	
1991–1993	Blue and White	Yellow	Camel	Canon, Elf, Labatt's (1991–1992), Bull, Sega (1993), Renault, Goodyear	"Camel" was replaced by the Camel logo or with "Williams"
1994–1997	Blue, White	Red, Gold	Rothmans	Elf, Renault, Segafredo (1994–1995), Sanyo (1995–1997), Black Tower (1996), Sonax (1996–1997), Divella, Hype Energy (1997), Castrol (1997), Goodyear	"Rothmans" was replaced with a barcode, "Williams", "Racing", "?" (1997 French Grand Prix) or "Ro?" (1997 British Grand Prix)
1998	Red	White	Winfield	Sonax, Veltins, Woody Woodpecker, Castrol, Du Pont, Falke, Auto motor und sport, Magneti Marelli	"Winfield" was replaced with "WilliamsF1" and the Winfield logo was replaced with an orange diamond with a black kangaroo or a black boomerang on it
1999	Red and White	Blue	Winfield	Castrol, Brother, Veltins, Woody Woodpecker, Petrobras, Fujitsu, Komatsu, Sonax, Auto motor und sport, Nortel	"Winfield" was replaced with "WilliamsF1" and the Winfield logo was replaced with an orange diamond with a black kangaroo or a black boomerang on it
2000–2005	White and Blue		BMW, Compaq (2000–02), HP (2002–05)	Castrol, Allianz (2001–05), Budweiser (2003–05), FedEx (2002–05), RBS (2005), Thomson Reuters, Veltins (2000–02), Niquitin (2003–04), Hamleys, Petrobras, Oris (2003–05), Intel (2000), Nortel Networks (2000–01), Worldcom (2001–02)	In races in Germany, because of trademark issues, "Anheuser-Busch" was placed below "Bud". For non-alcohol races, Sea World Adventure Parks (from Anheuser-Busch's Busch Entertainment theme parks) replaced Budweiser
2006	Deep Blue	White	Allianz	RBS, FedEx, Tata, Mobilecast, Petrobras, Budweiser, Oris, Hamleys, Cosworth, Thomson Reuters	
2007	Blue	White	AT&T, Lenovo	RBS, Allianz, Petrobras, Hamleys, Oris, Thomson Reuters, Philips, AirAsia	
2008	Dark Blue	White	AT&T, RBS, Hamleys	Philips, Lenovo, Allianz, Petrobras, Oris, Thomson Reuters	
2009	Dark Blue	White	AT&T, RBS, Philips	Allianz, Thomson Reuters, Oris, Randstad, AirAsia	
2010	Blue	White	AT&T, RBS, Philips	Allianz, Randstad, Oris, HELL ENERGY, Accenture, Thomson Reuters, Air Asia, GAC, Ridge Solutions	
2011	Blue, White	Red, Gold	AT&T, PDVSA	Randstad, Venezuela Tourism, Oris, Ridge Solutions, Thomson Reuters, GAC, Pirelli, Cosworth	
2012–2013	Dark Blue	White, Red	PDVSA	Randstad, Gillette (2012), Renault, Embratel (2012), Venezuela Tourism, Oris, Head & Shoulders (2012), Ridge Solutions (2012), Thomson Reuters (2012), Pirelli, Wihuri (2013), Kemppi (2013), Experian (2013), Astana Tourism (2013)	The team celebrated their 600th Grand Prix at the 2013 German Grand Prix
2014	White	Dark Blue, Light Blue, Red	Martini	Randstad, Petrobras, Experian, Genworth, Thomson Reuters, Banco do Brasil, Oris, Wihuri, Kemppi, Pirelli, Esquire	Alcohol advertising is illegal in Bahrain, Abu Dhabi, France and Russia. The livery was also altered for the official video games. 2017 driver Lance Stroll, being 18 years old, was required to run devoid of Martini logos on his helmet at certain Grands Prix as some alcohol industry regulations prohibit advertising of alcohol by those under 21 years of age, such as in the United States. The 007 logo appeared at the mirror with Williams FW37 during the 2015 Mexican Grand Prix, to promote SPECTRE, as Williams had a partnership with Jaguar in designing Jaguar C-X75 in 2011, that was featured in the film driven by Mr. Hinx.
2015	White	Dark Blue, Light Blue, Red	Martini	Randstad, Pirelli, Petrobras, Rexona, Oris, Hackett London, Wihuri, Kemppi, Genworth, Avanade, Thomson Reuters, BT, Esquire	
2016	White	Dark Blue, Light Blue, Red	Martini	Randstad, Pirelli, Petrobras, Rexona, Oris, Hackett London, Wihuri, Avanade, Thomson Reuters, BT, Esquire, Financial.org	
2017	White	Dark Blue, Light Blue, Red	Martini	Randstad, Pirelli, Rexona, Oris, Hackett London, Avanade, BT, Financial.org, JCB	
2018	White	Dark Blue, Light Blue, Red	Martini	Rexona, JCB, SMP Racing, Oris, BT, Acronis, Financial.org, Canada Life, Pirelli	
2019	White, Blue	Black	ROKiT	Rexona, PKN Orlen, Sofina, Acronis, Pirelli, Financial Times, Symantec	
2020	White	Light Blue, Dark Blue		Sofina, Acronis, Lavazza, Ponos, Pirelli, RBC, Financial Times, Dare to be Different, Spinal Injuries Association	Williams unveiled an updated livery before the first race of the season and entered as Williams Racing after splitting with ROKiT.
2021	Dark Blue, White	Yellow, Light Blue		Sofina, Acronis, Lavazza, Ponos, Pirelli, Financial Times, Dorilton Ventures (VERSA Integrity Group, Honibe, JuliaHub, Blackbird.AI), Bremont, The King's Man	At the Saudi Arabian Grand Prix, Williams (along with the other F1 teams) raced the Frank Williams Racing Cars logo in tribute to founder Frank Williams who died on 28 November. The movie The King's Man sponsored the car for the 2021 Abu Dhabi Grand Prix.
2022	Dark Blue	Light Blue, Black, Red, White		Sofina, Acronis, Lavazza, Pirelli, Dorilton Ventures (casuaLens, VERSA Integrity Group, Honibe, JuliaHub, Cycuity, Blackbird.AI, Ursa Space Systems), Bremont, Duracell, Financial Times, DTEX Systems, Broadcom, Bang & Olufsen, Virtua, Spinal Injuries Association	
2023	Dark Blue	Light Blue, Red, Orange		Acronis (Infinigate Cloud), Pirelli, Gulf Oil, Dorilton Ventures, Duracell, Financial Times, PureStream, Stephens Inc., Michelob Ultra, Bremont, Jumeirah Hotels & Resorts, Kraken, Myprotein	Williams raced a one-off livery to celebrate their 800th Grand Prix entry at the British and Hungarian Grands Prix. The British Grand Prix was supposed to be Williams' 800th Grand Prix entry, though this was curtailed due to cancelled Emilia Romagna Grand Prix in May. The team's 800th Grand Prix entry was at the Hungarian Grand Prix. The team raced a fan-voted Gulf Oil livery for the Singapore, Japanese and Qatar Grands Prix.
2024	Dark Blue, Navy Blue	Black, Orange, White		Dorilton Ventures (causaLens, JuliaHub), Pirelli, Duracell, Gulf Oil, PureStream, Stephens Inc., THG Ingenuity Cloud Services, Kraken, Myprotein, VAST Data, Komatsu, Keeper Security, Globant, Mercado Libre	The team raced a special Mercado Libre livery designed to invoke the design of the championship-winning Williams FW14 at the Mexico City and São Paulo Grands Prix. A similar livery, but with Keeper branding, was raced at the Las Vegas Grand Prix.
2025	Navy Blue, Dark Blue, Light Blue	Black, Orange, White	Atlassian	Dorilton Ventures, Pirelli, Duracell, Gulf Oil (Reviva Coffee), Stephens Inc., THG Ingenuity Cloud Services, Kraken, Myprotein, VAST Data, Komatsu, Keeper Security, Brillio, FanCapital, Santander, Betway, Jackpot City, Airia, Zoox, NMC²	A throwback BMW livery was raced for the 2025 United States Grand Prix, a special Gulf livery was raced for the São Paulo Grand Prix, and an Atlassian Rovo livery was raced for the following Las Vegas Grand Prix.
2026	Dark Blue	Light Blue, White, Black, Orange	Atlassian	Pirelli, Barclays, Duracell, Gulf Oil, Stephens Inc., Kraken, VAST Data, Komatsu, Keeper Security, Brillio, Betway, Jackpot City, Airia, NMC², Wilkinson Sword, Claude, New Era, BNY, Nuveen, Estrella Galicia, Spinal Injuries Association	A Saudia throwback livery was raced for the Spanish Grand Prix. Two liveries were not raced but were applied to the chassis: the first being a "stealth" livery for the pre-season shakedown, and the other a collaborative livery with Undone's Dandadan series that was unveiled at Anime Expo 2026.

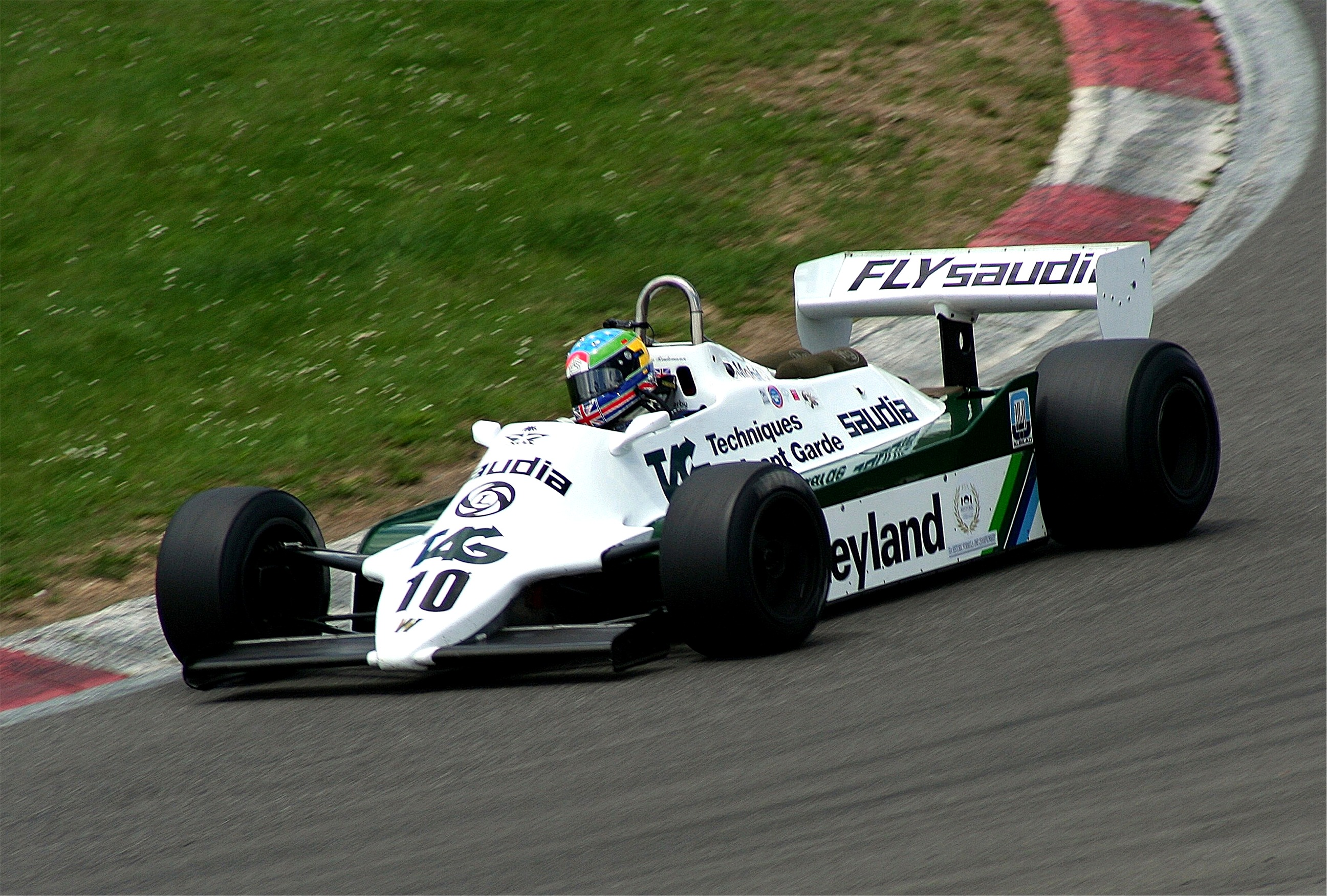
Williams was sponsored primarily by Saudi Arabian Airlines from 1978 to 1984. This is a Williams FW07C being driven in 2007 at the DAMC 05 Oldtimer Festival Nürburgring.

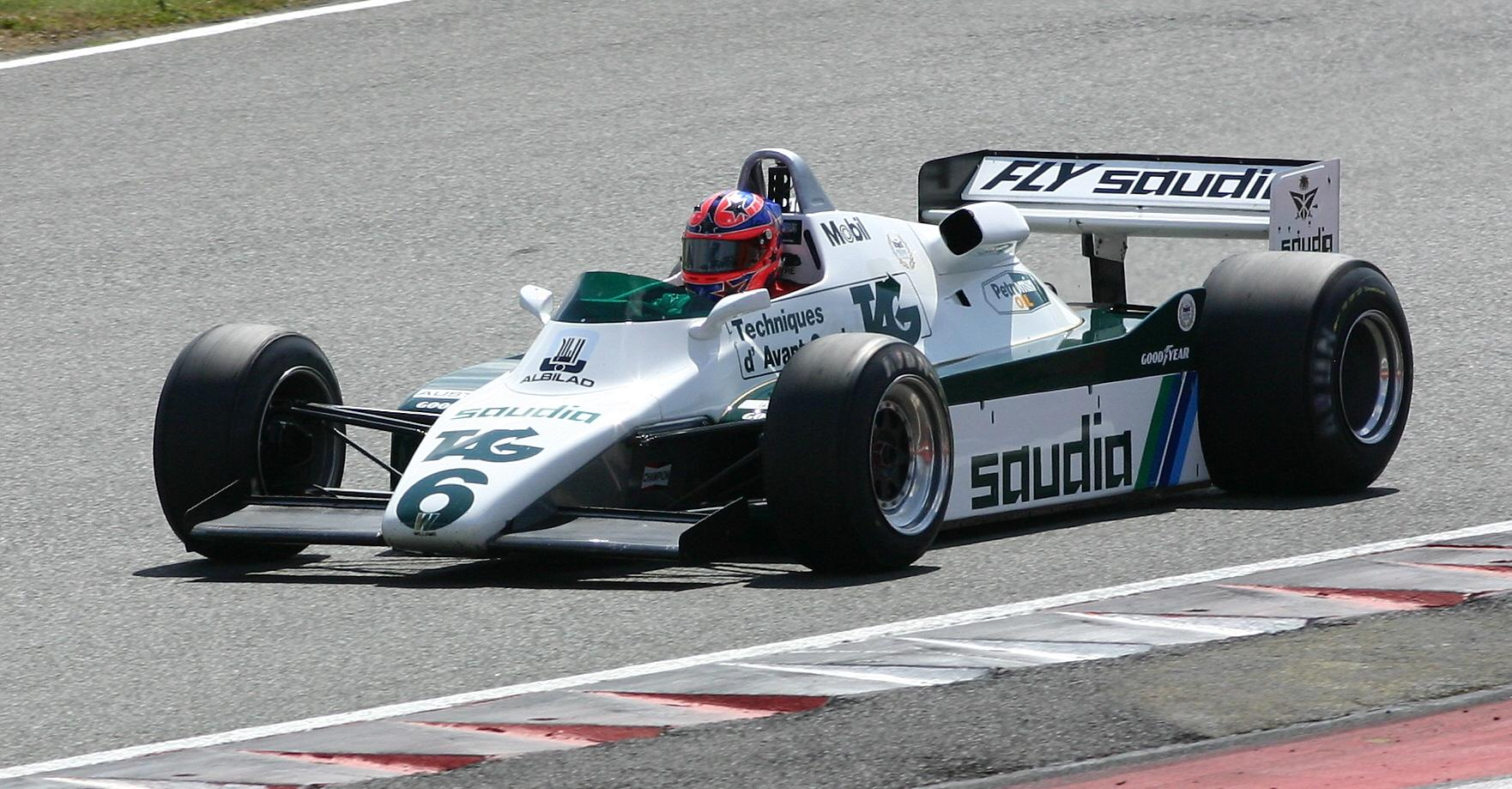
A Williams FW08 from 1982 being tested at Silverstone in 2006

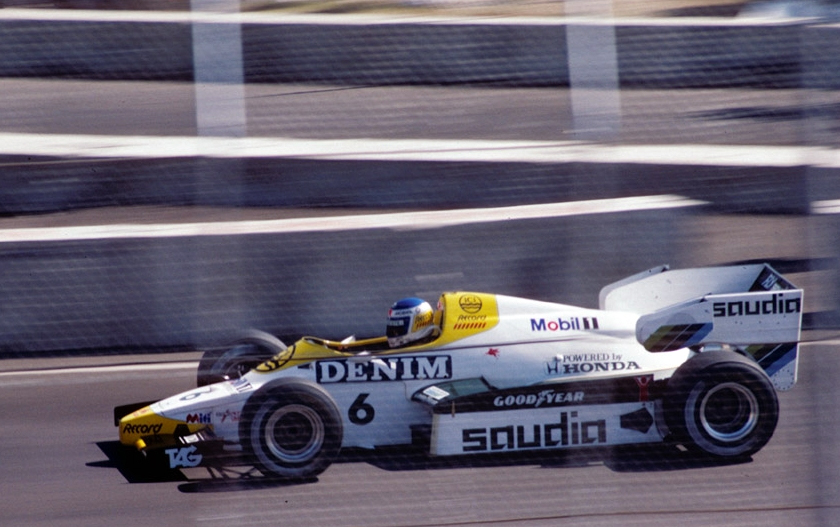
Keke Rosberg driving the Saudia-sponsored Williams FW09 at the 1984 Dallas GP

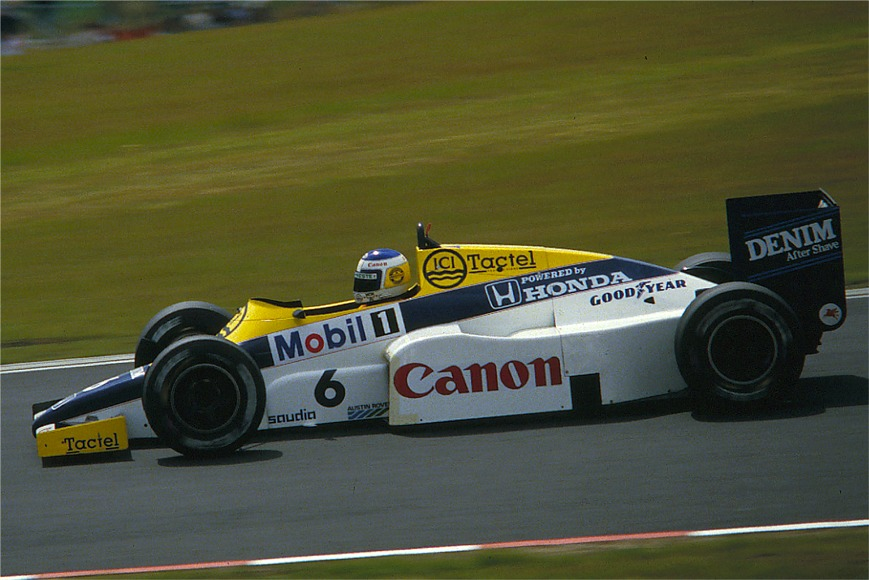
Williams switched to Canon sponsorship in 1985 and retained it until 1993. This is Keke Rosberg driving the Williams FW10 at the 1985 German Grand Prix.

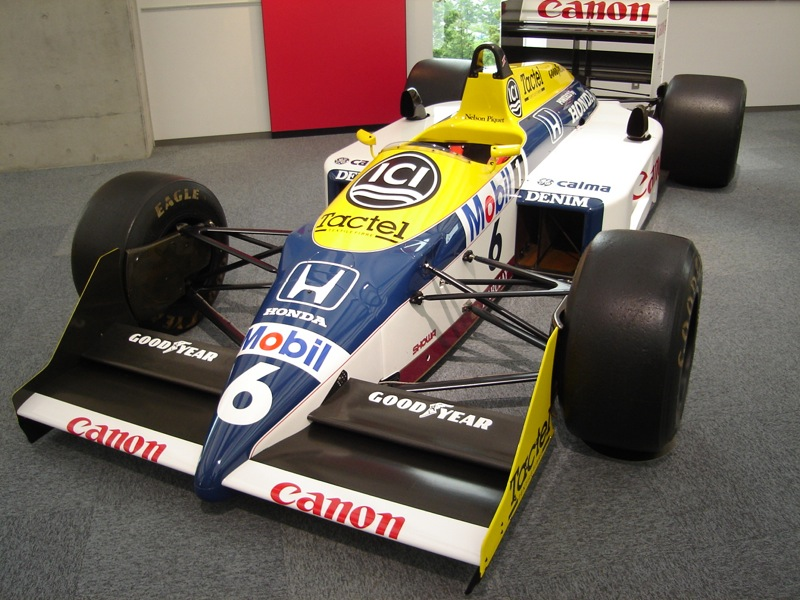
A Williams FW11B from 1987 season

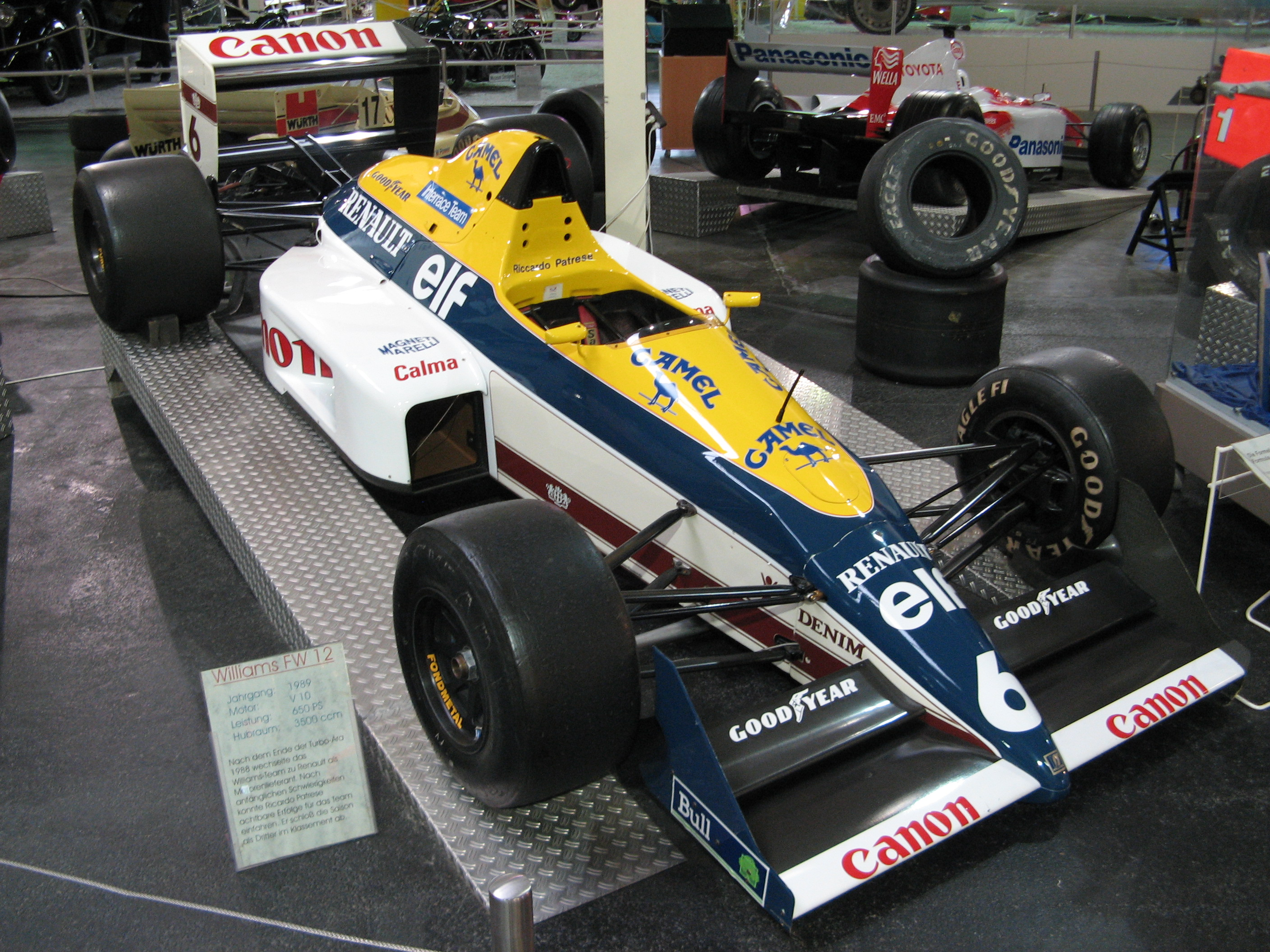
Riccardo Patrese's Williams FW12 from 1989 season in display

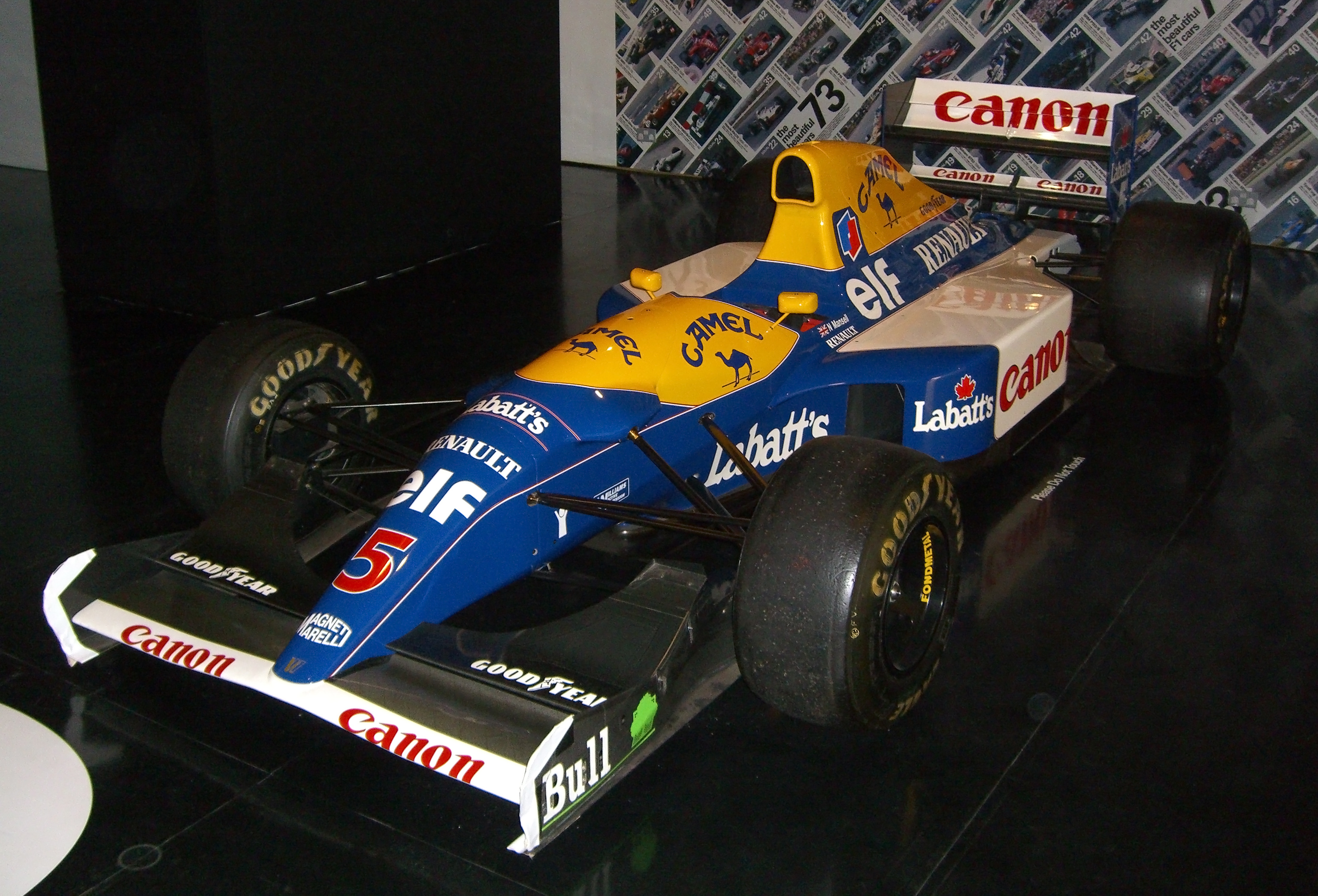
Mansell's Williams FW14B from 1992 season in display

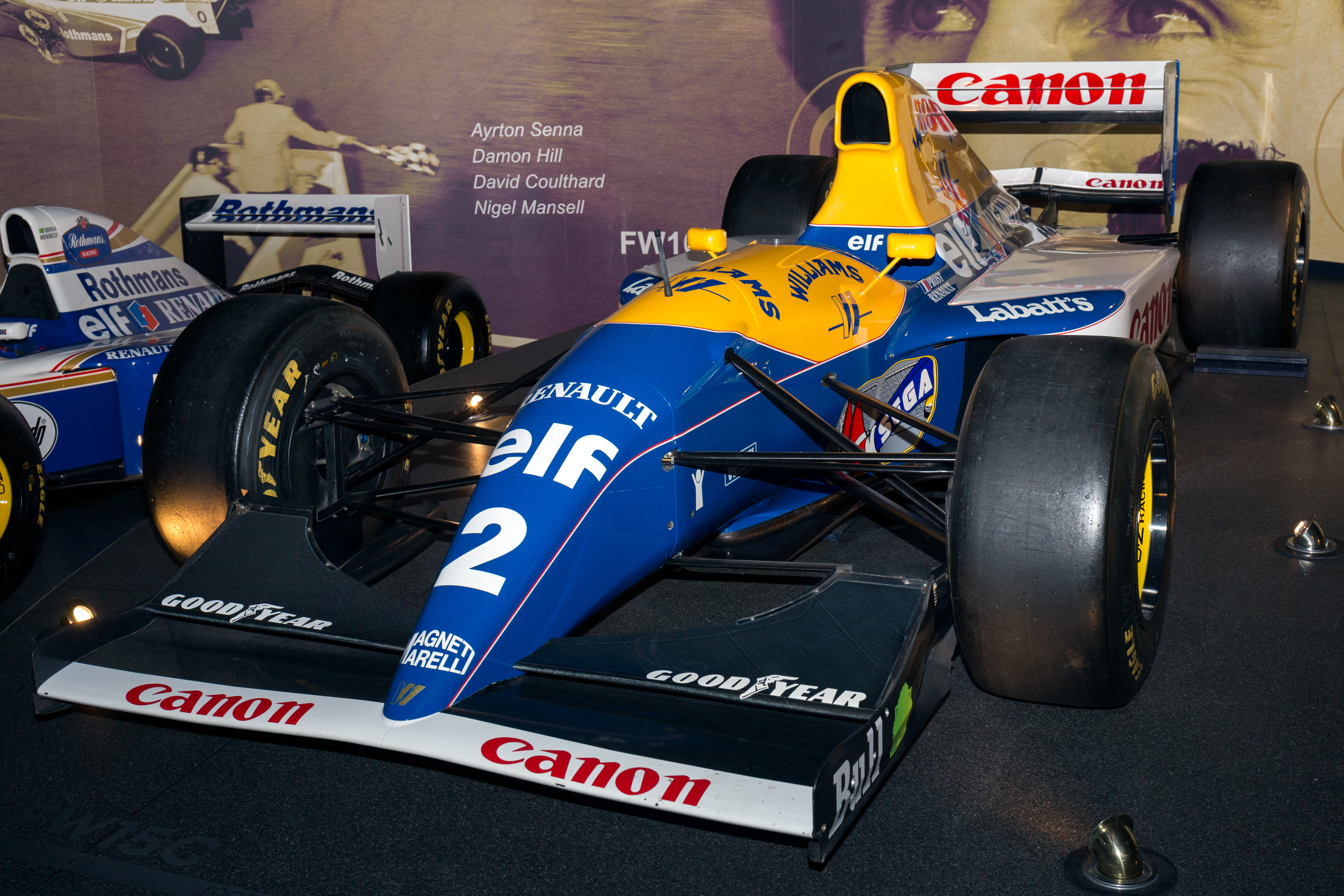
Alain Prost's Williams FW15C at Williams' headquarters

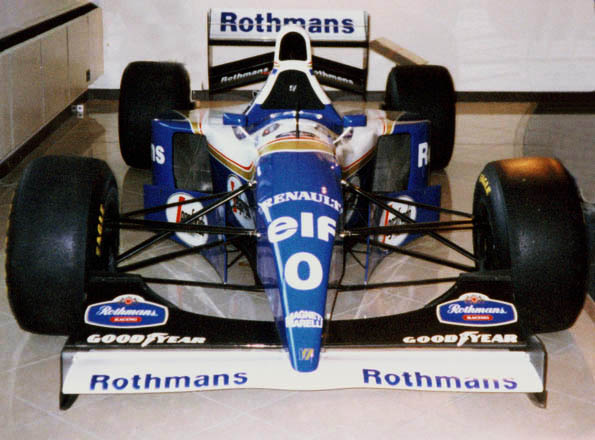
Damon Hill's #0 Williams FW16 from 1994 season in display

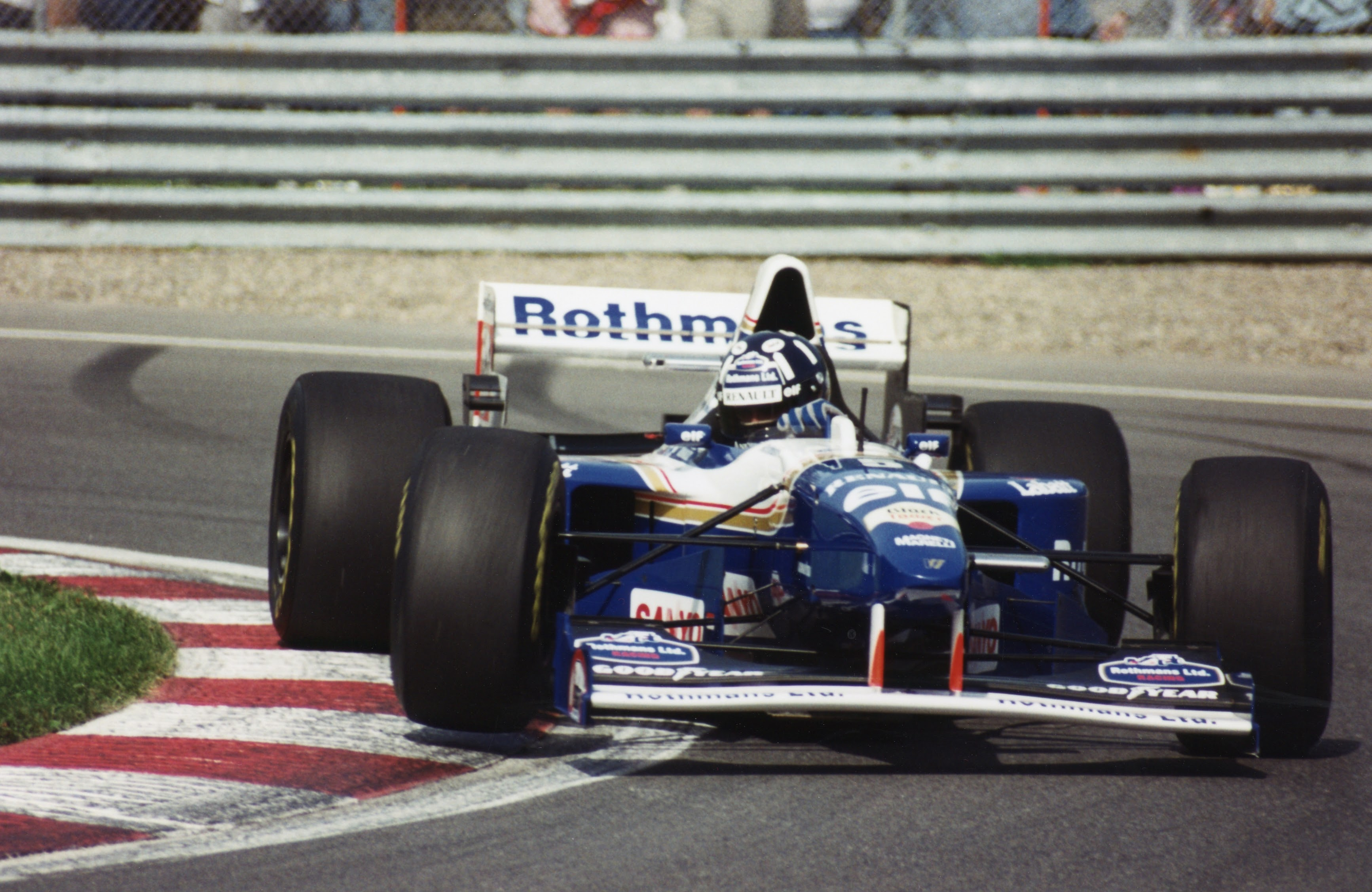
Damon Hill driving for Williams at Montreal in 1995

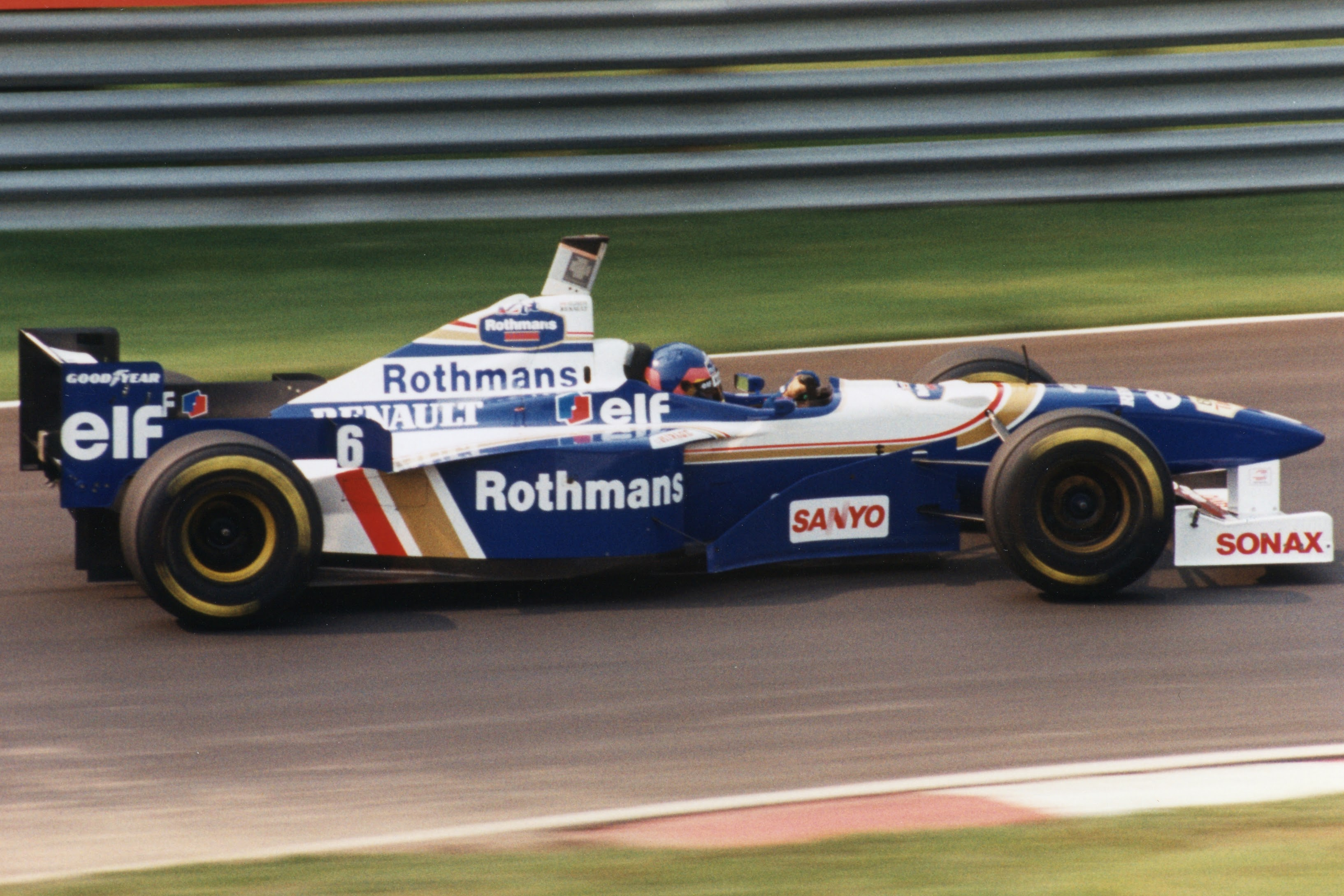
The team switched to Rothmans backing in 1994, which it kept until the end of 1997. This is Jacques Villeneuve driving the Williams FW18 at the 1996 Canadian Grand Prix.

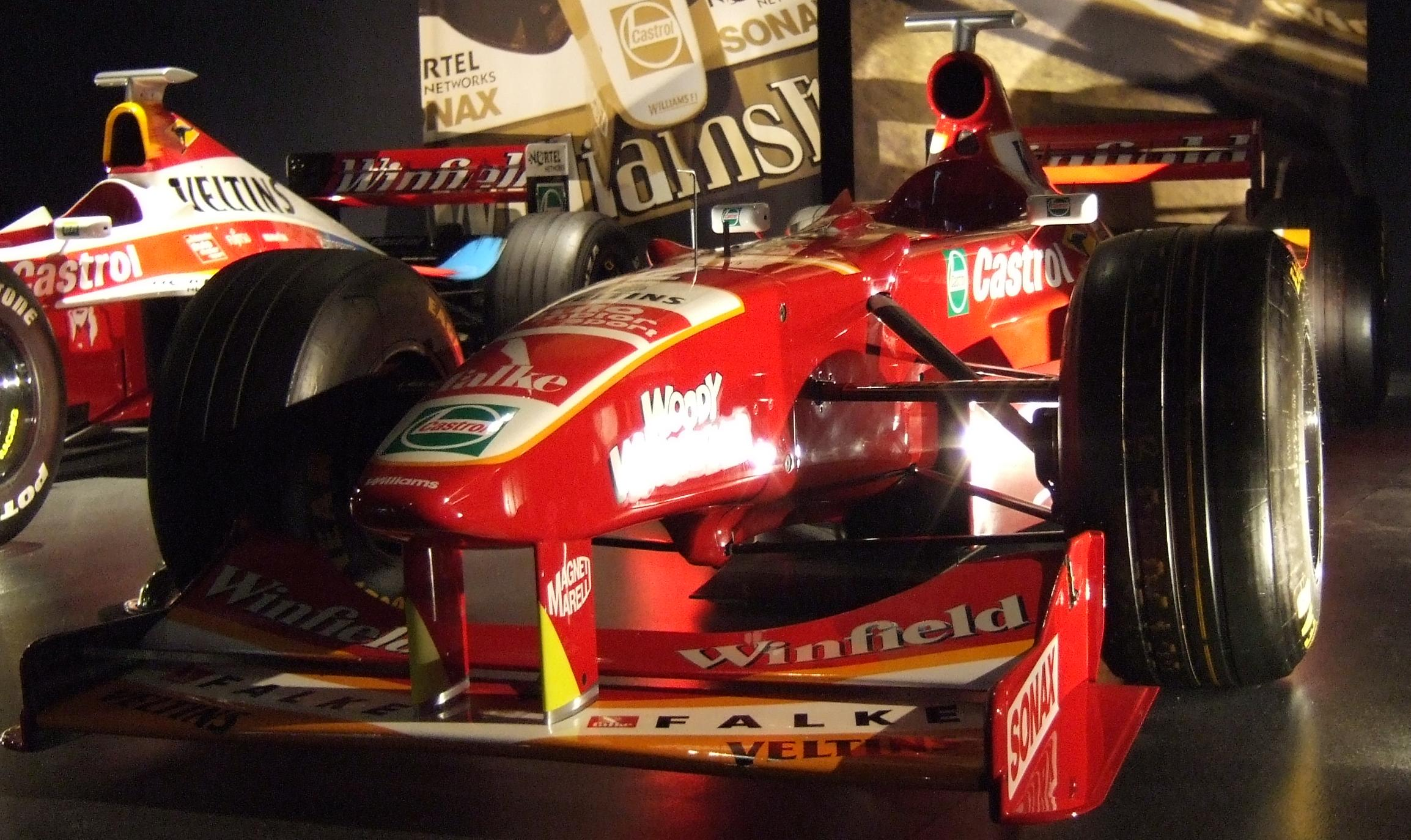
From 2 years later, Williams switched to Winfield, an Australian brand of cigarettes

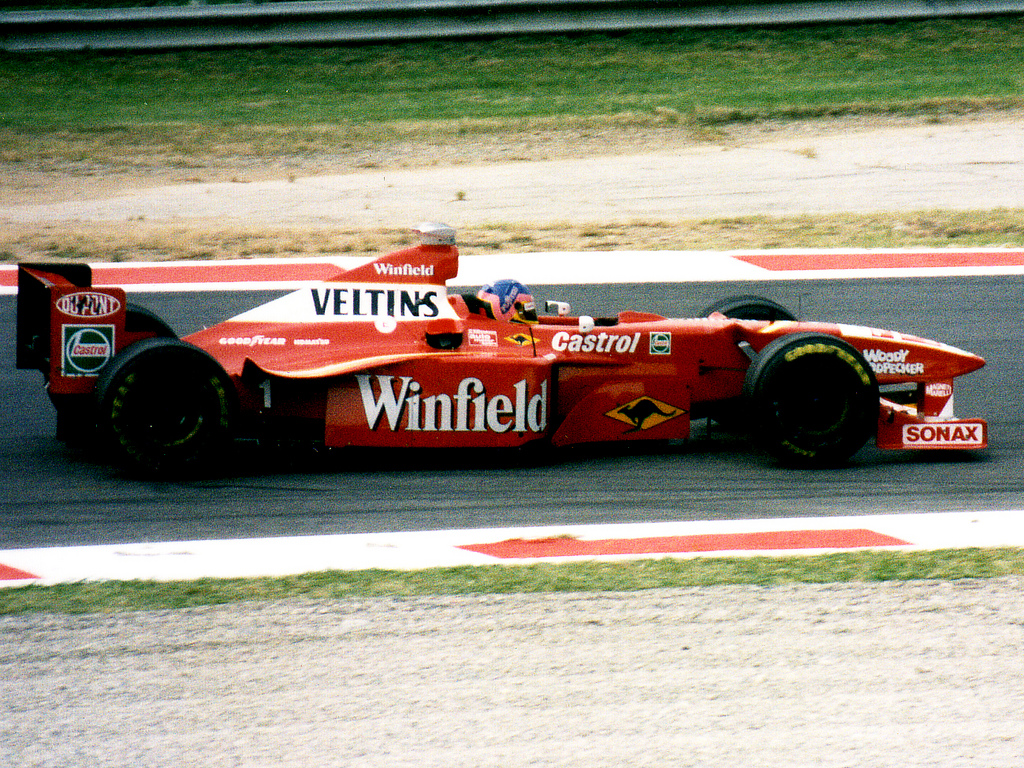
Jacques Villeneuve driving for Williams at Monza in 1998

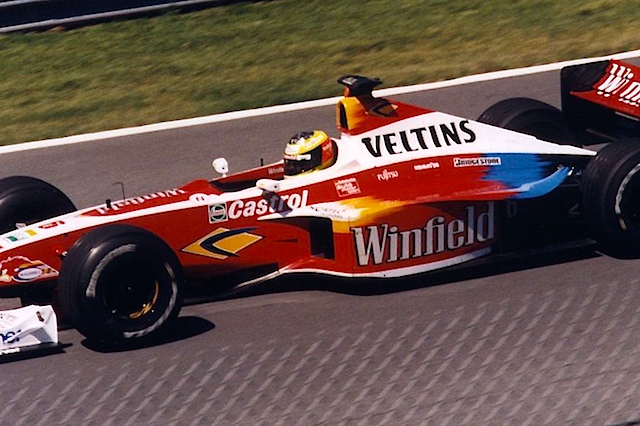
Ralf Schumacher driving for Williams at the 1999 Canadian Grand Prix

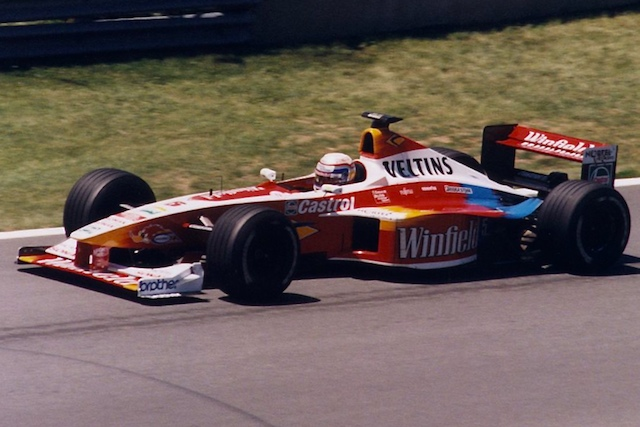
Alessandro Zanardi driving for Williams at the 1999 Canadian Grand Prix.

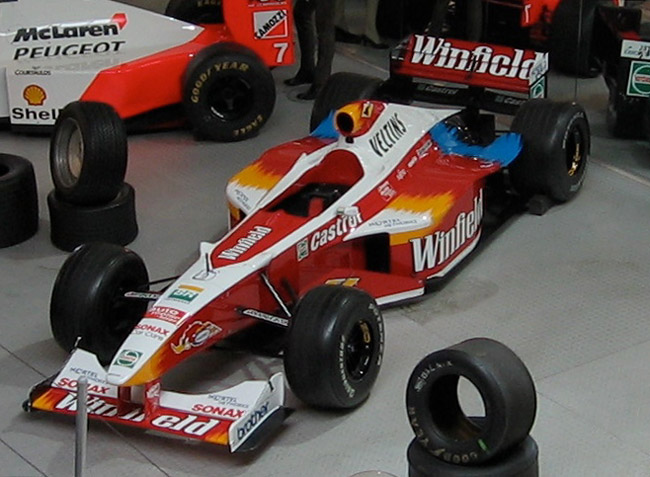
A Williams FW21 in display at the Auto and Technic Museum in Sinsheim

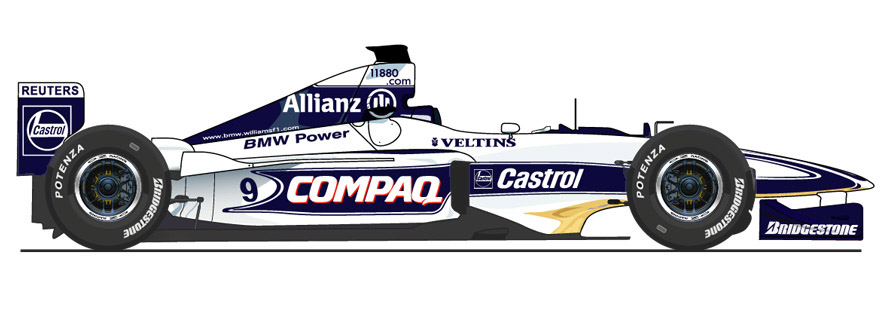
The 2000 season's Williams FW22. The first Williams car to sport the BMW blue and white livery, sponsored by Compaq

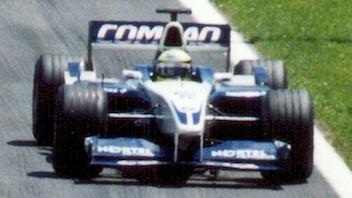
Ralf Schumacher driving for Williams at the 2001 Canadian Grand Prix

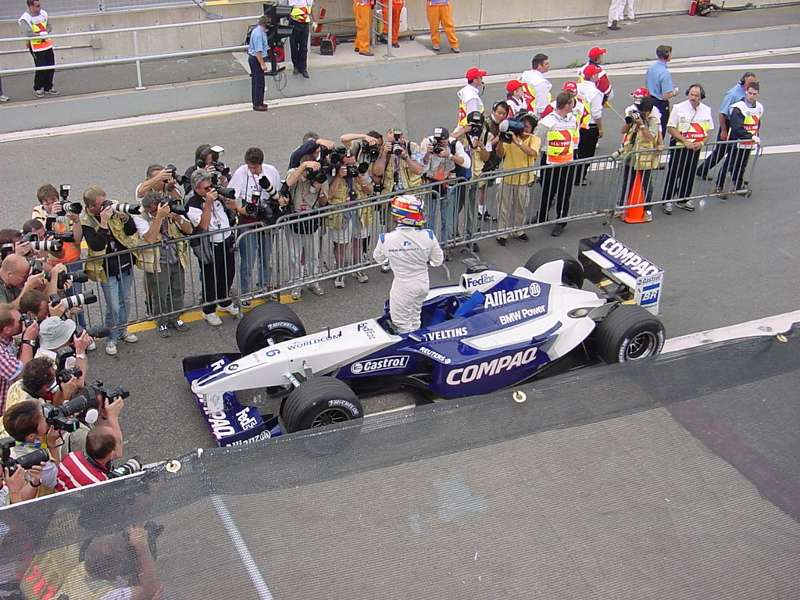
Juan Pablo Montoya's Williams FW24 in the box during 2002 Canadian Grand Prix qualifiers

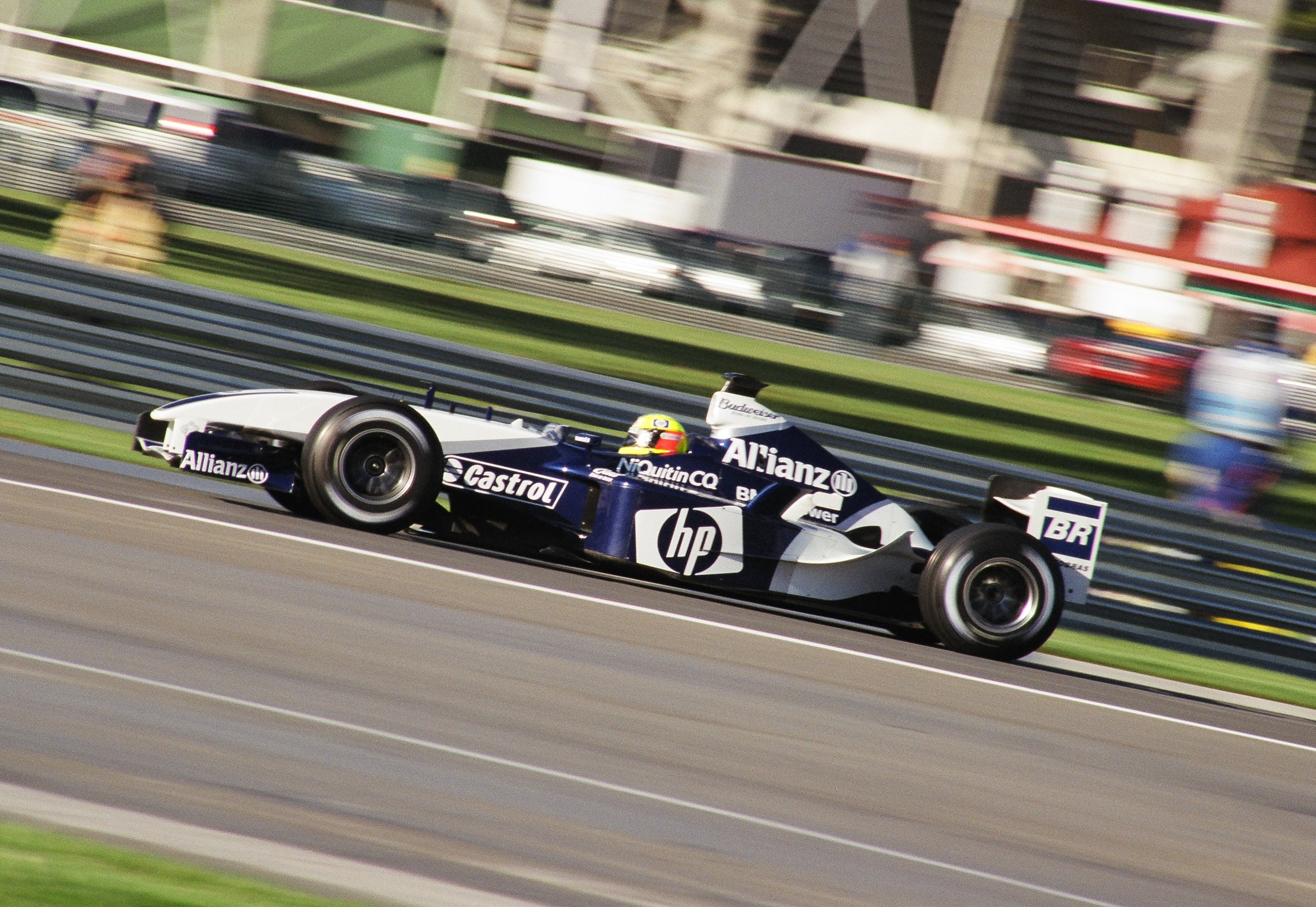
Ralf Schumacher driving the HP-sponsored Williams FW25 at the 2003 United States Grand Prix.

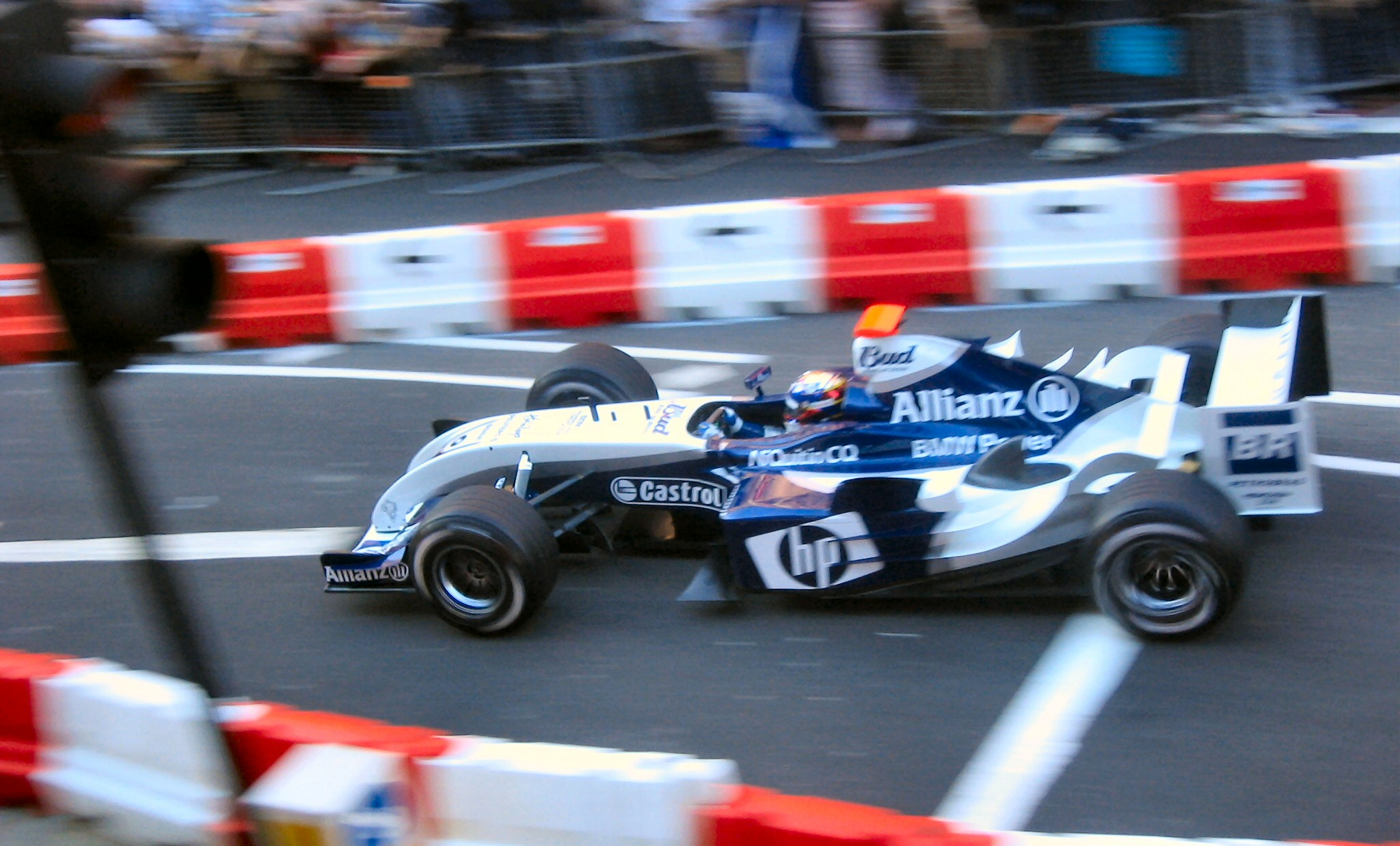
A 2004 Williams FW26 being driven in Regent Street, London.

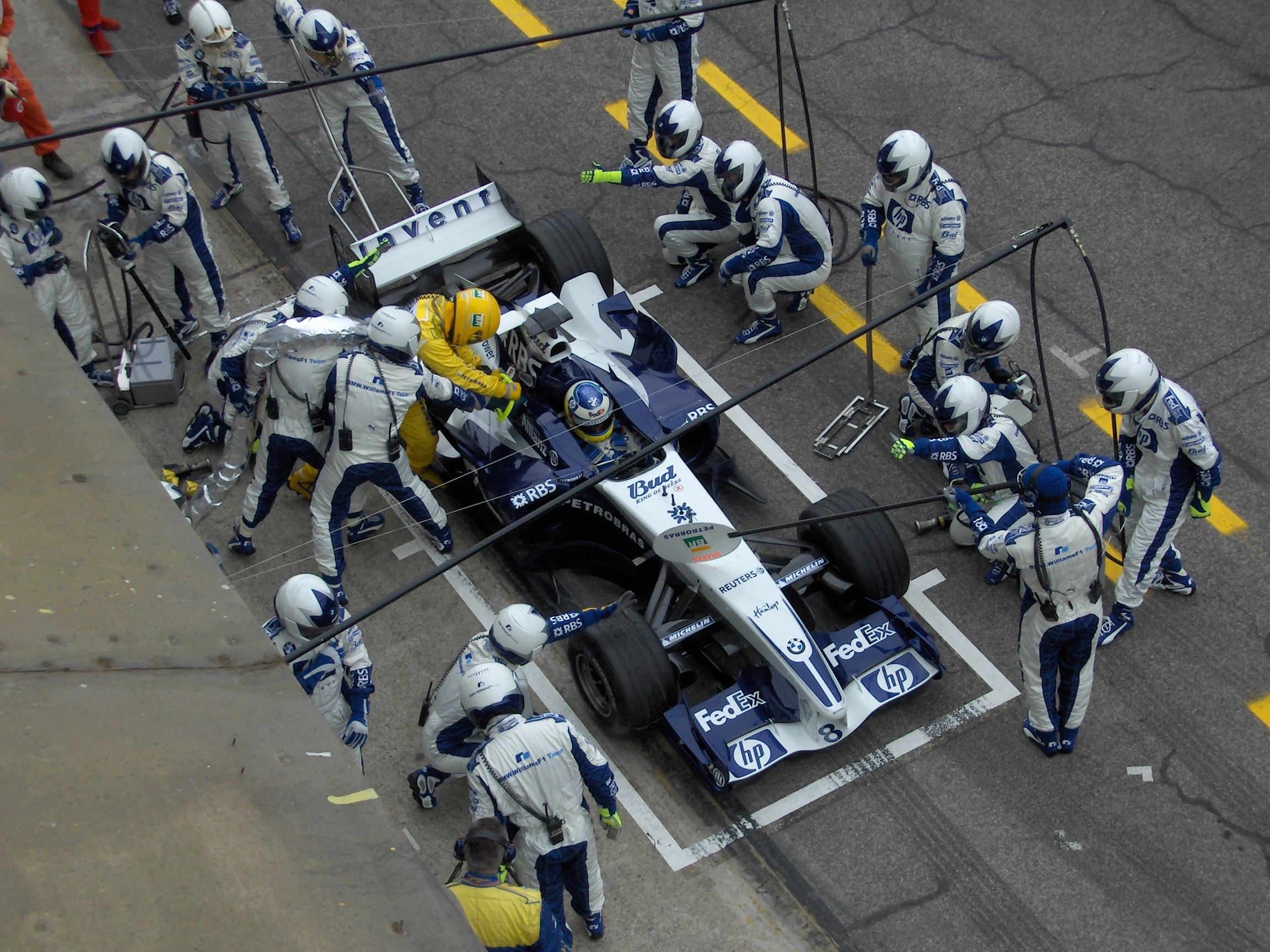
Nick Heidfeld at the 2005 San Marino Grand Prix

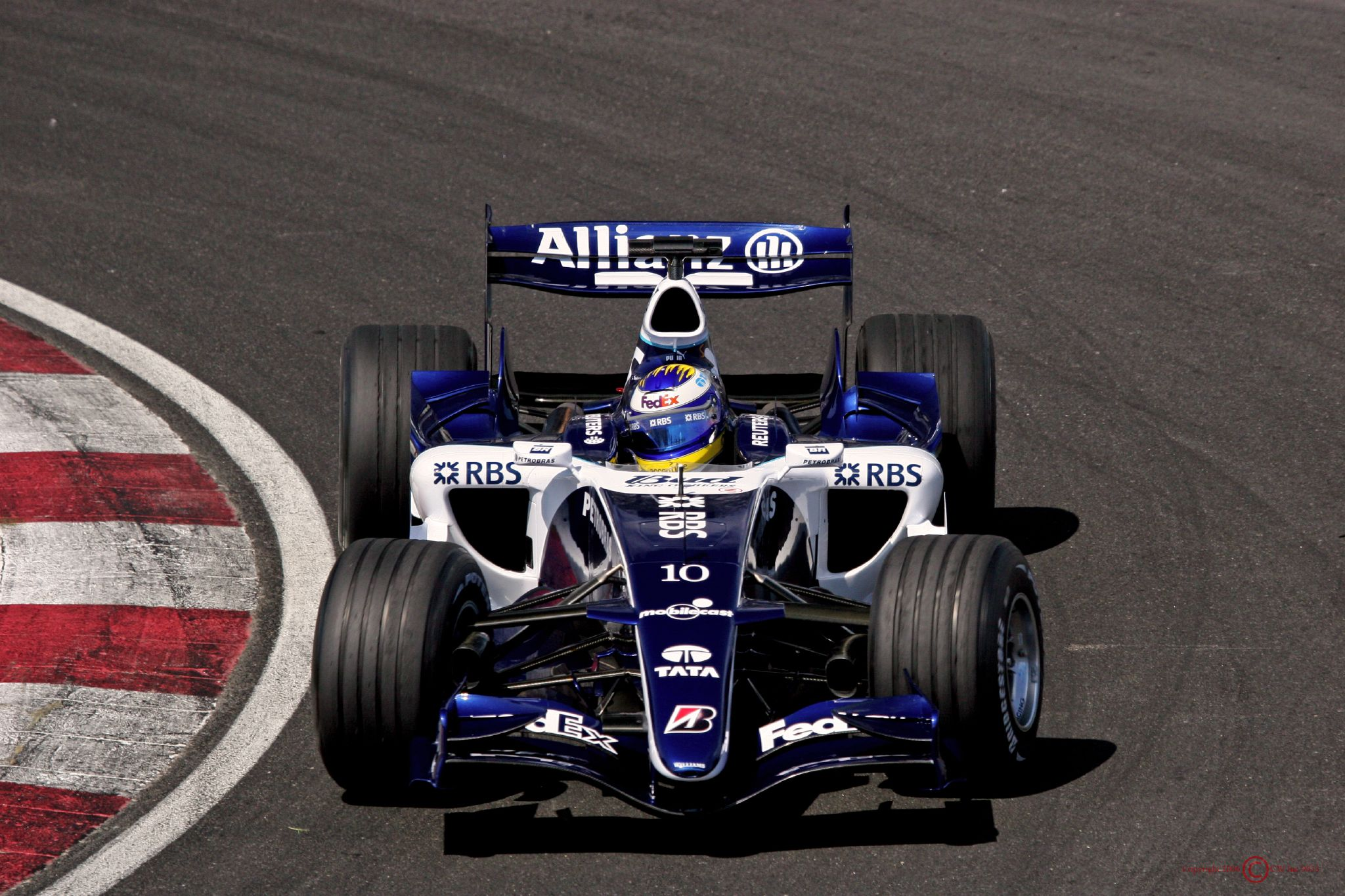
Since 2006, the team's liveries have been based on a dark blue-and-white theme. This is Nico Rosberg driving the Williams FW28 at the 2006 Canadian Grand Prix.

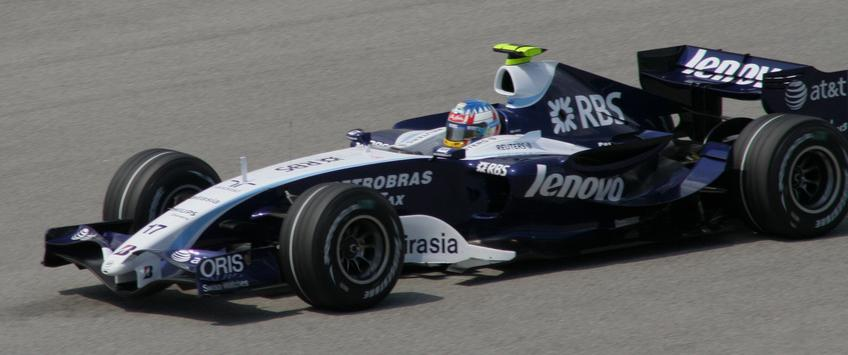
Alexander Wurz driving the Williams FW29 at the 2007 Malaysian GP. The livery remained the same, with Lenovo replacing HP

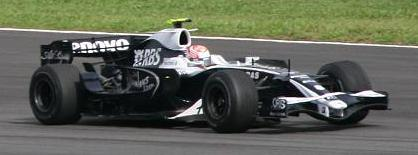
Kazuki Nakajima driving for Williams at the 2008 Malaysian GP.

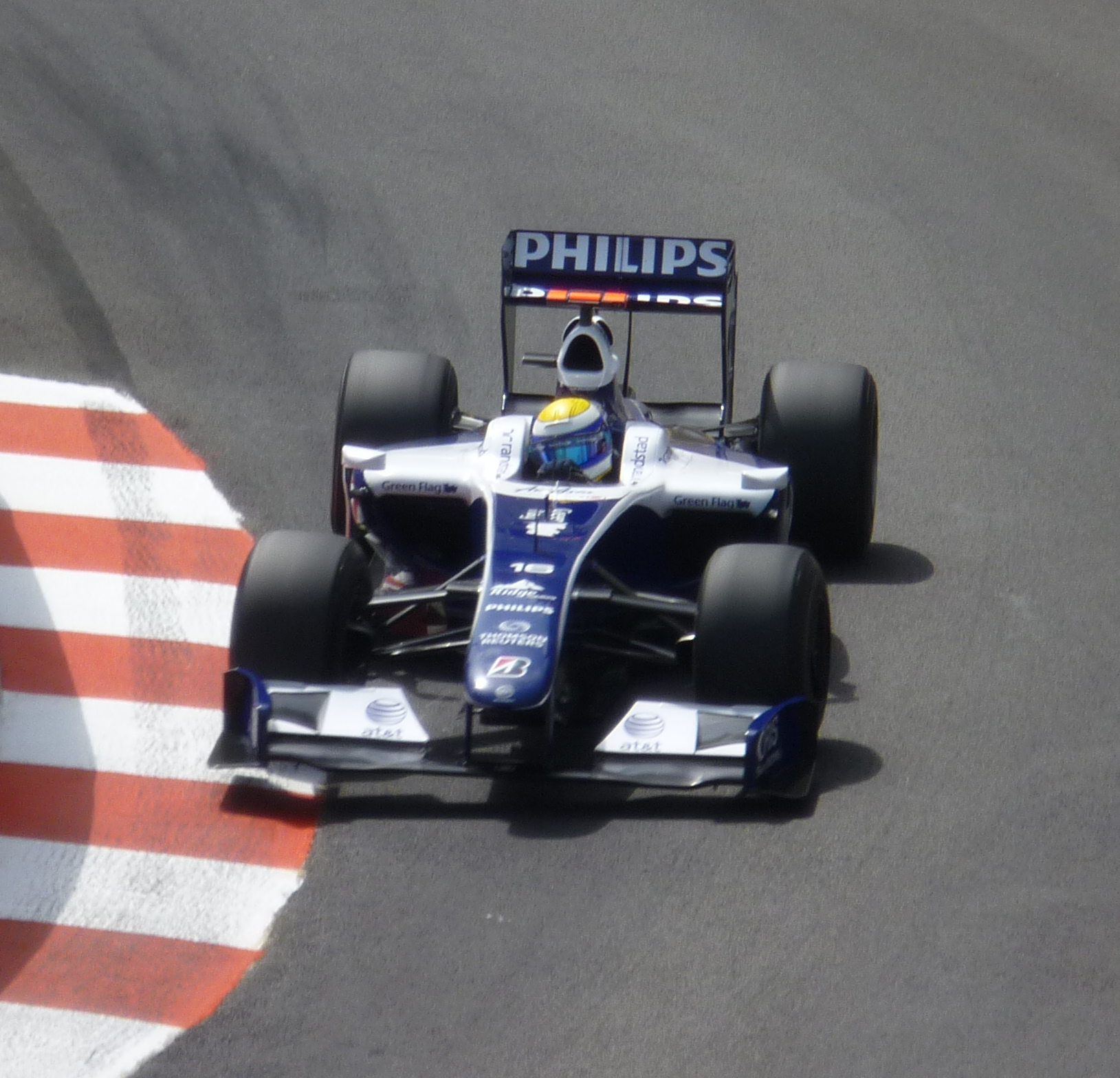
Nico Rosberg at the 2009 Monaco GP

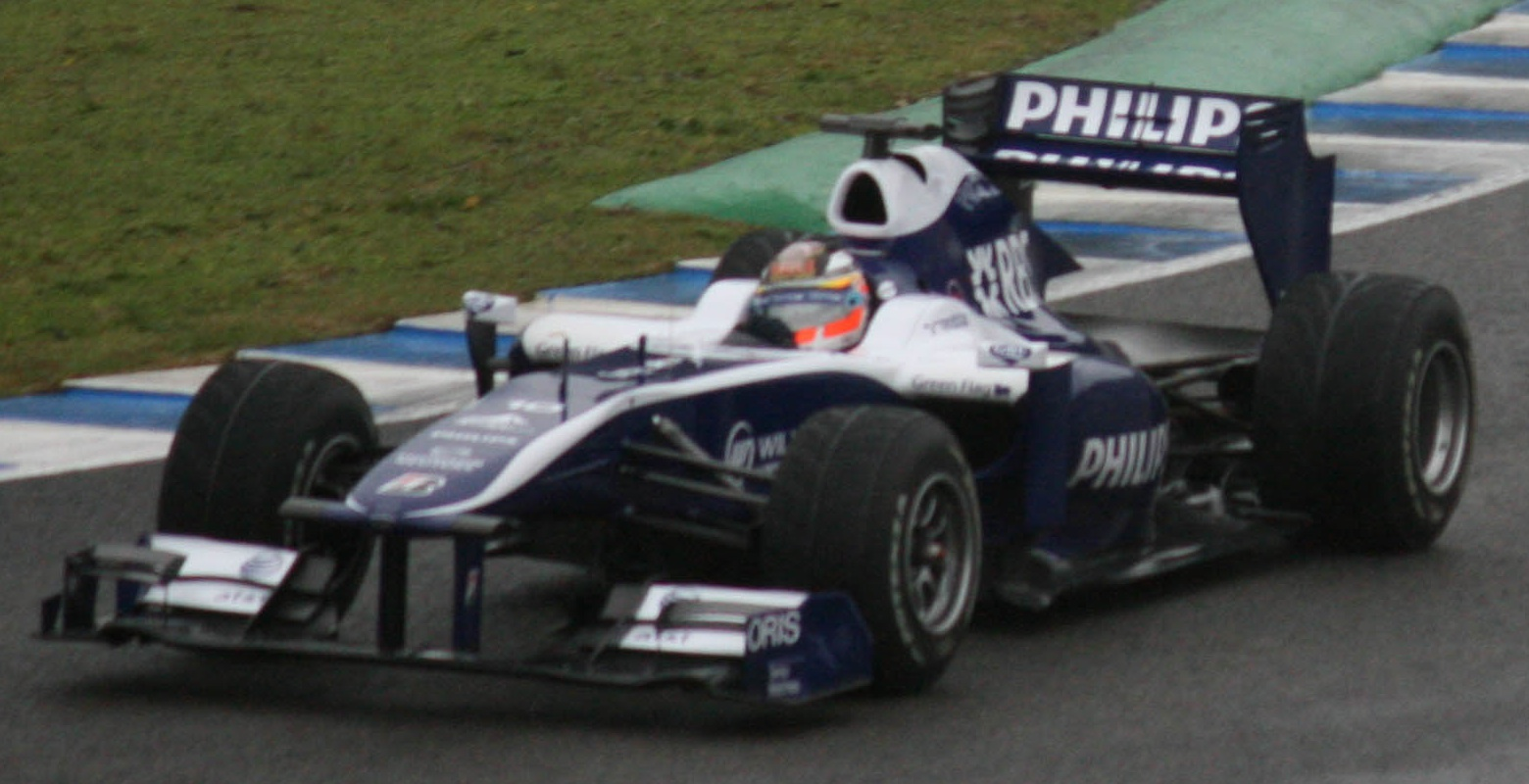
Nico Hülkenberg driving the Williams FW32 in Jerez.

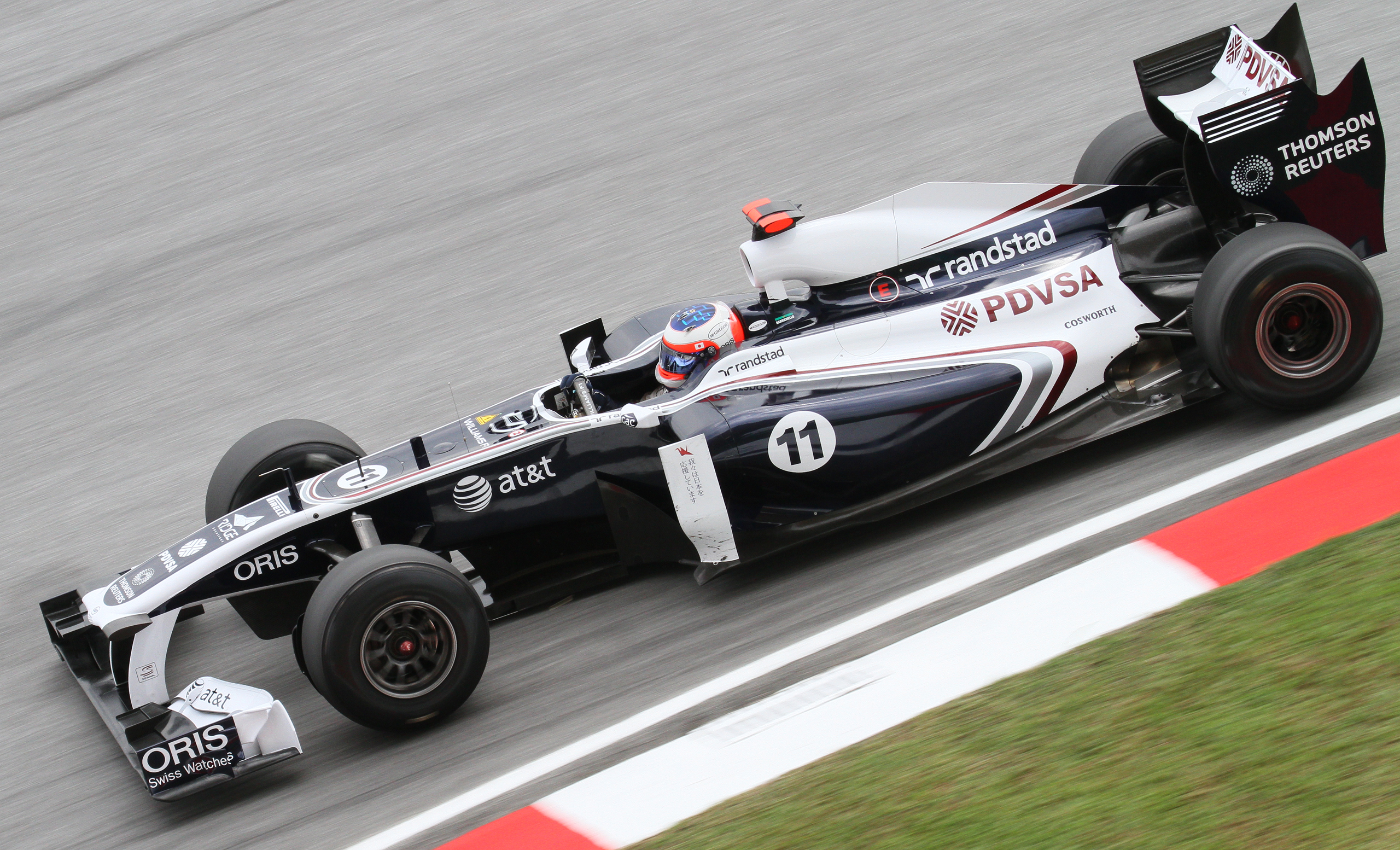
In 2011, the livery was slightly changed with red and gold additional colours added to resemble the Rothmans livery used from 1994 to 1997.

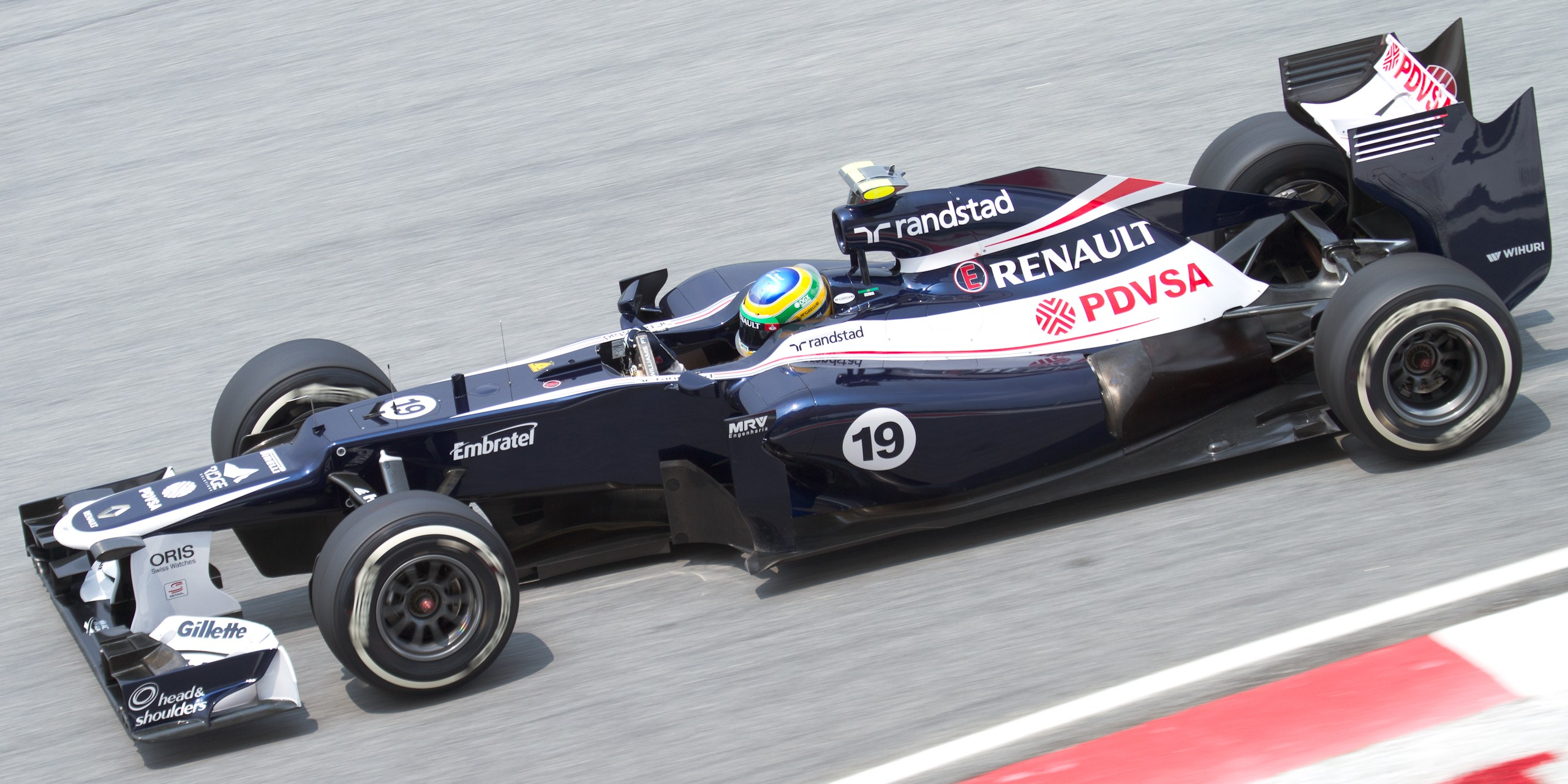
Bruno Senna driving at the 2012 Malaysian Grand Prix.

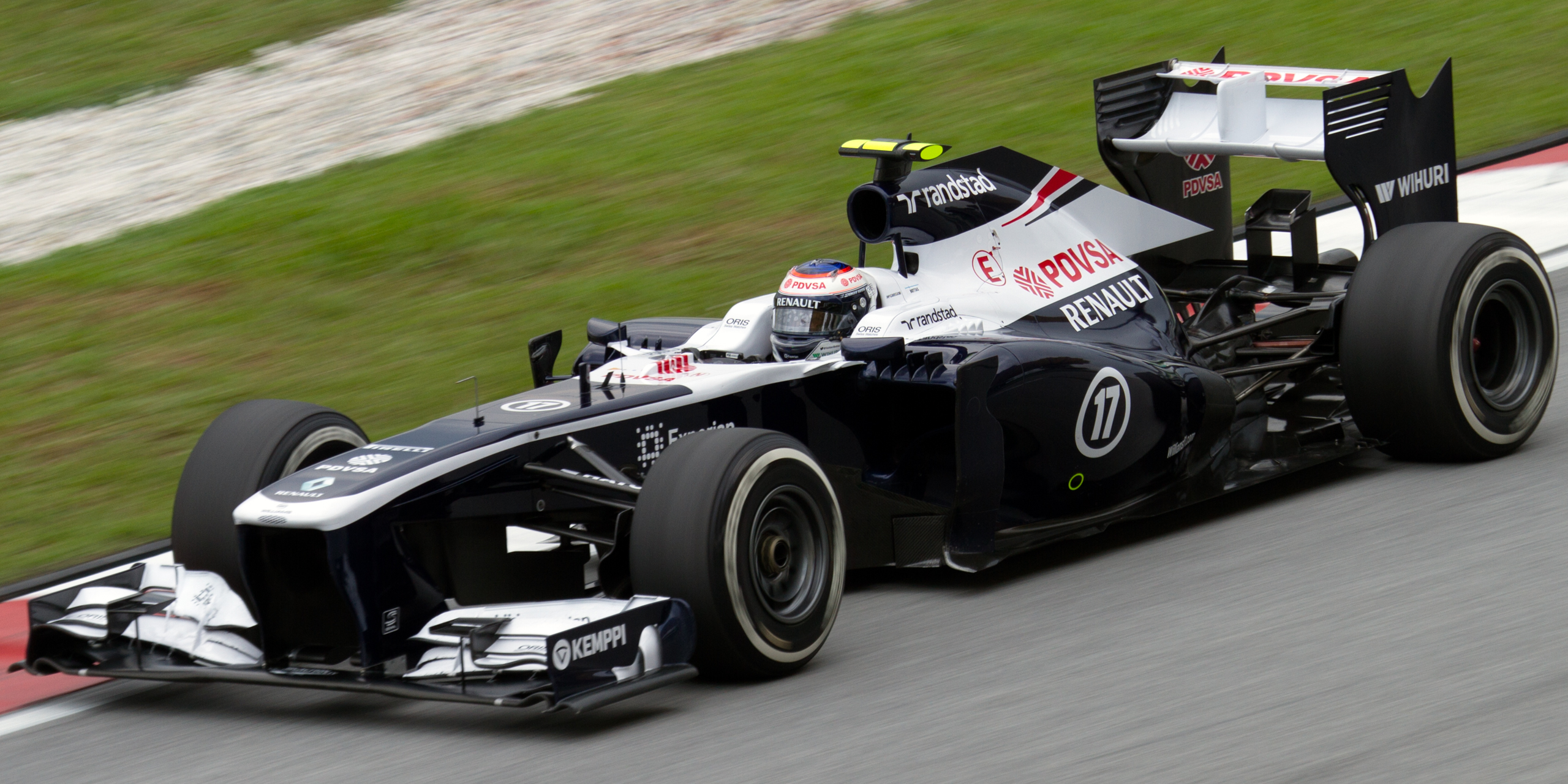
Valtteri Bottas driving the Williams FW35 at the 2013 Malaysian Grand Prix.

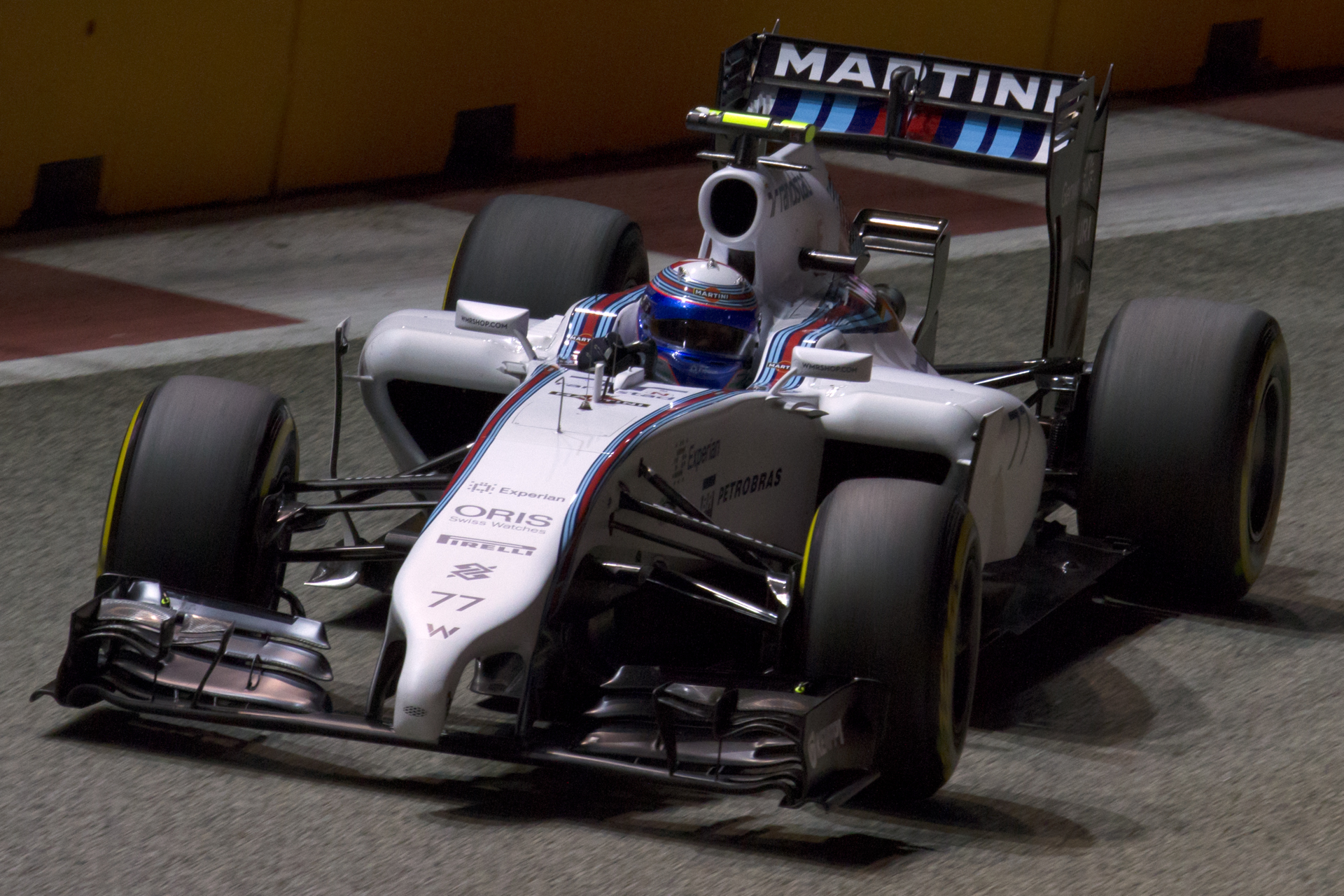
Valtteri Bottas driving the Martini-sponsored the Williams FW36 at the 2014 Singapore Grand Prix.

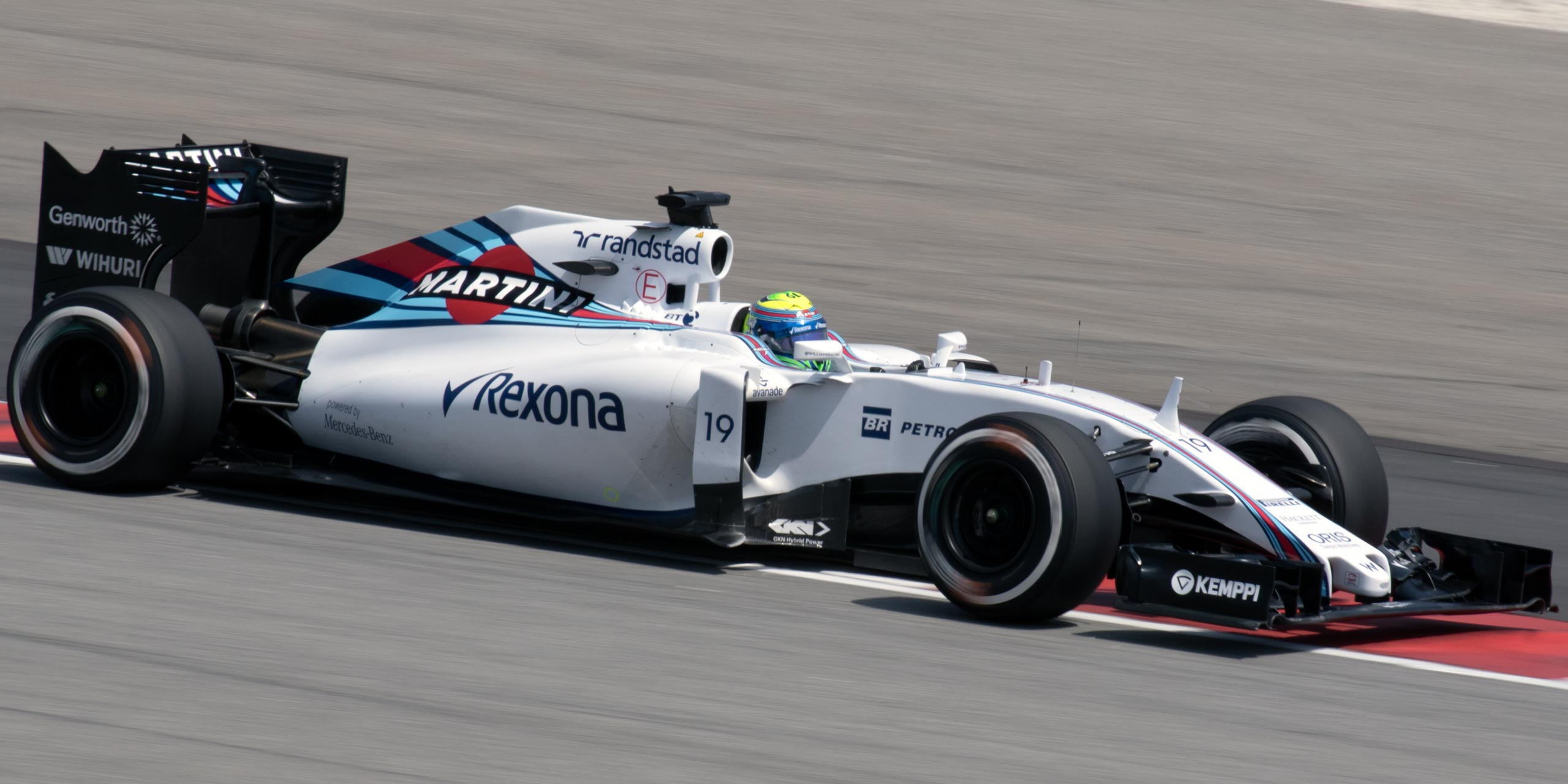
Felipe Massa driving the Williams FW37 at the 2015 Malaysian Grand Prix.

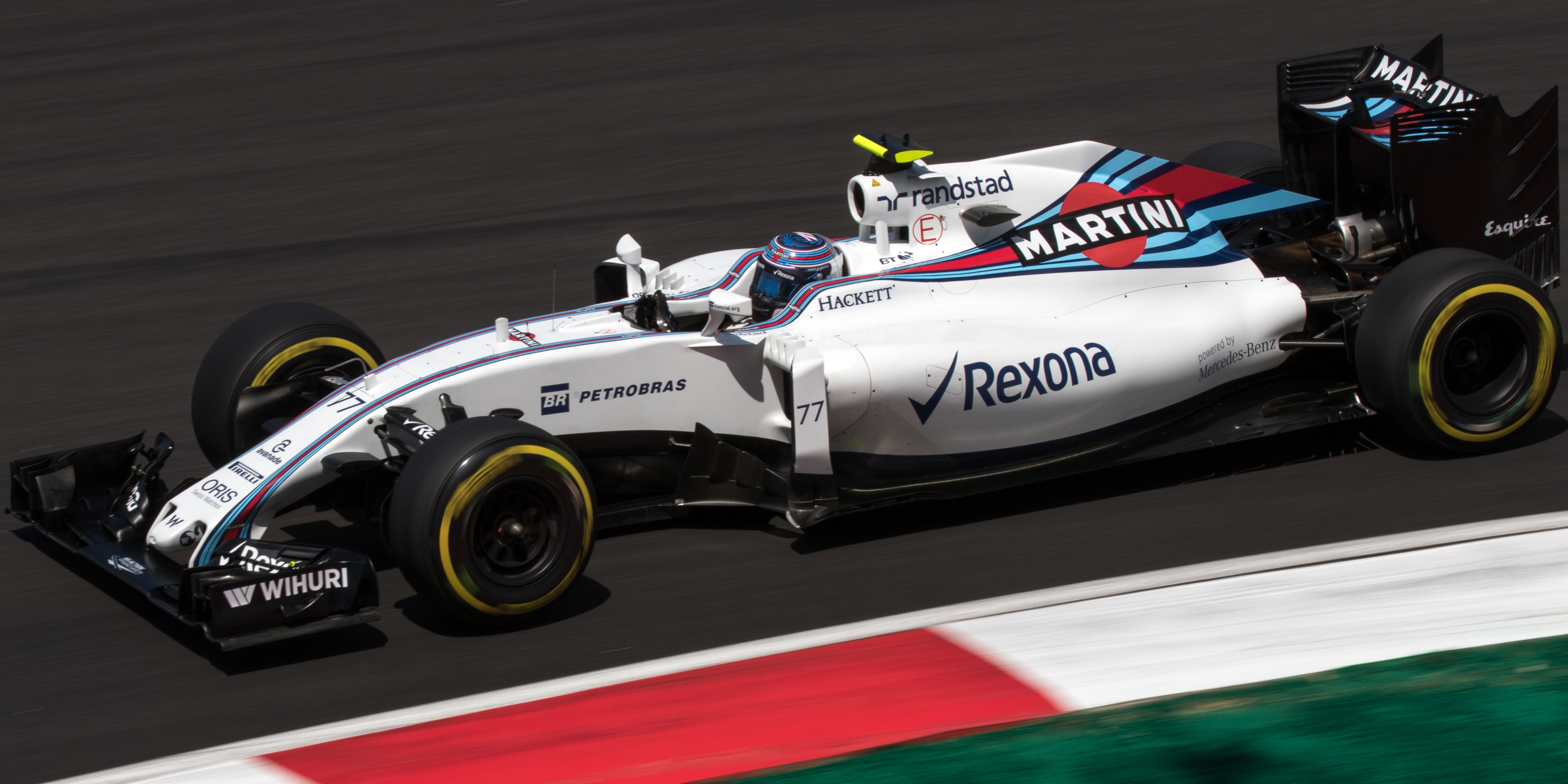
Valtteri Bottas driving the Williams FW38 at the 2016 Malaysian Grand Prix.

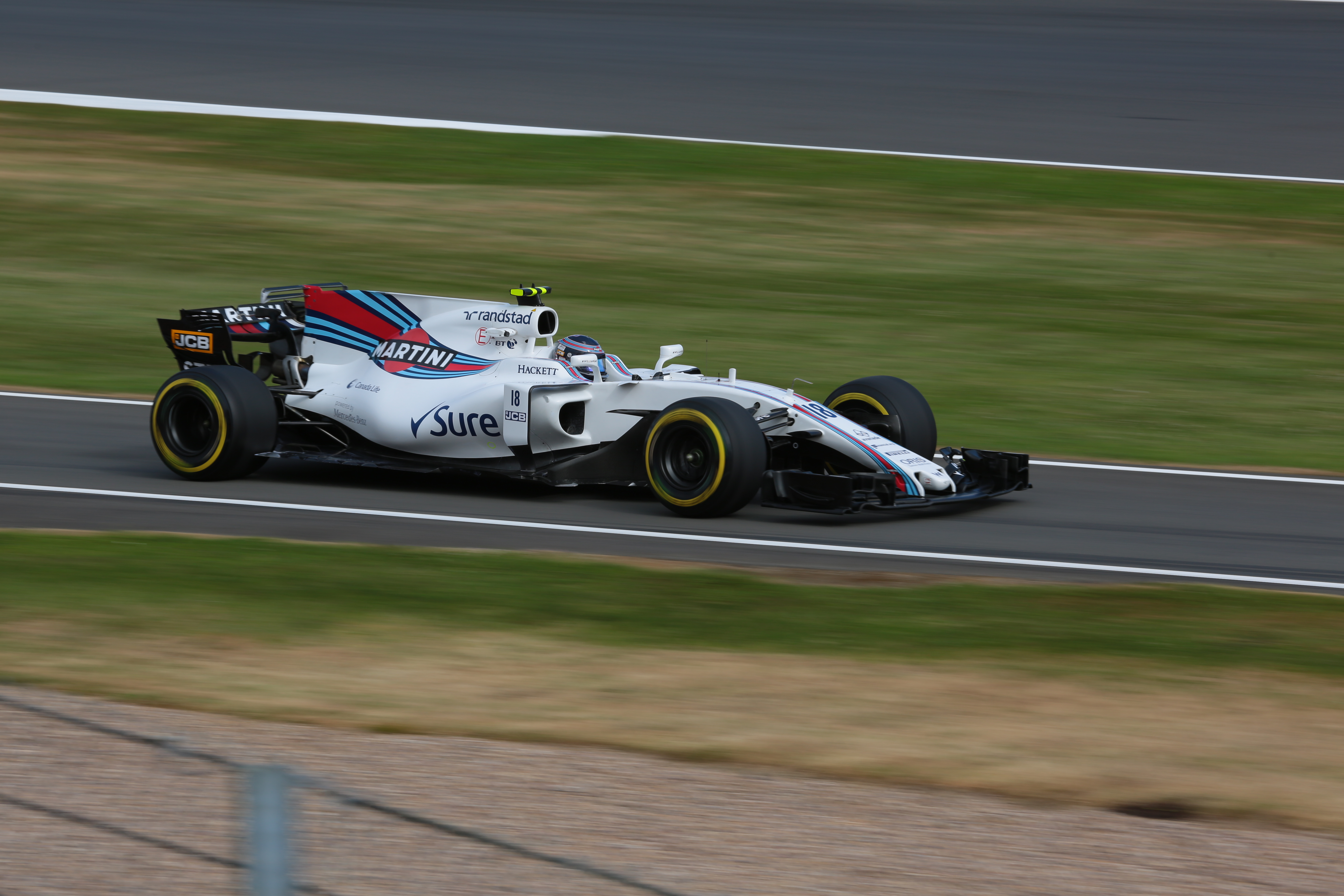
Lance Stroll driving the Williams FW40 at the 2017 British Grand Prix.

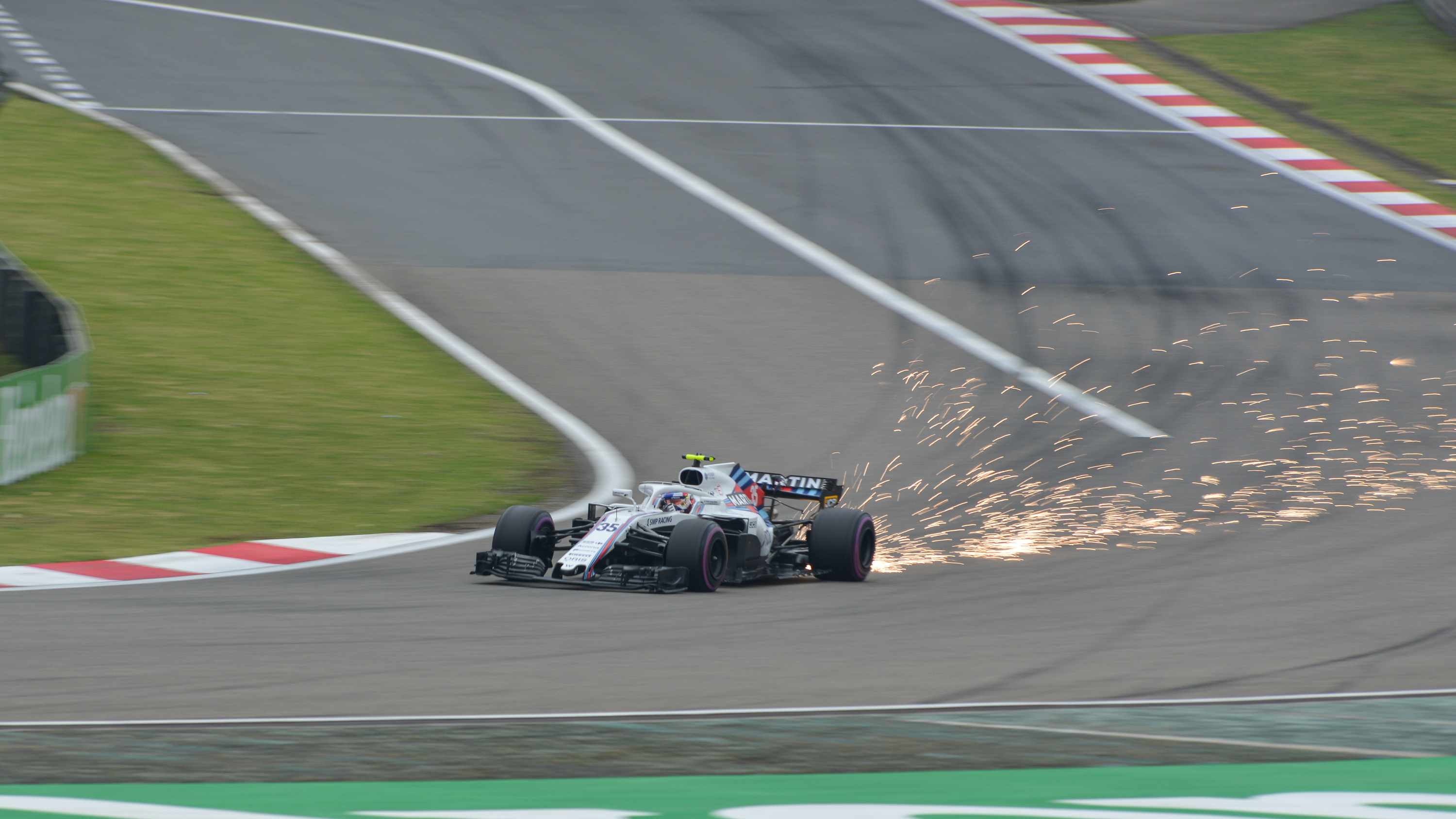
Sergey Sirotkin driving the Williams FW41 at the 2018 Chinese Grand Prix.

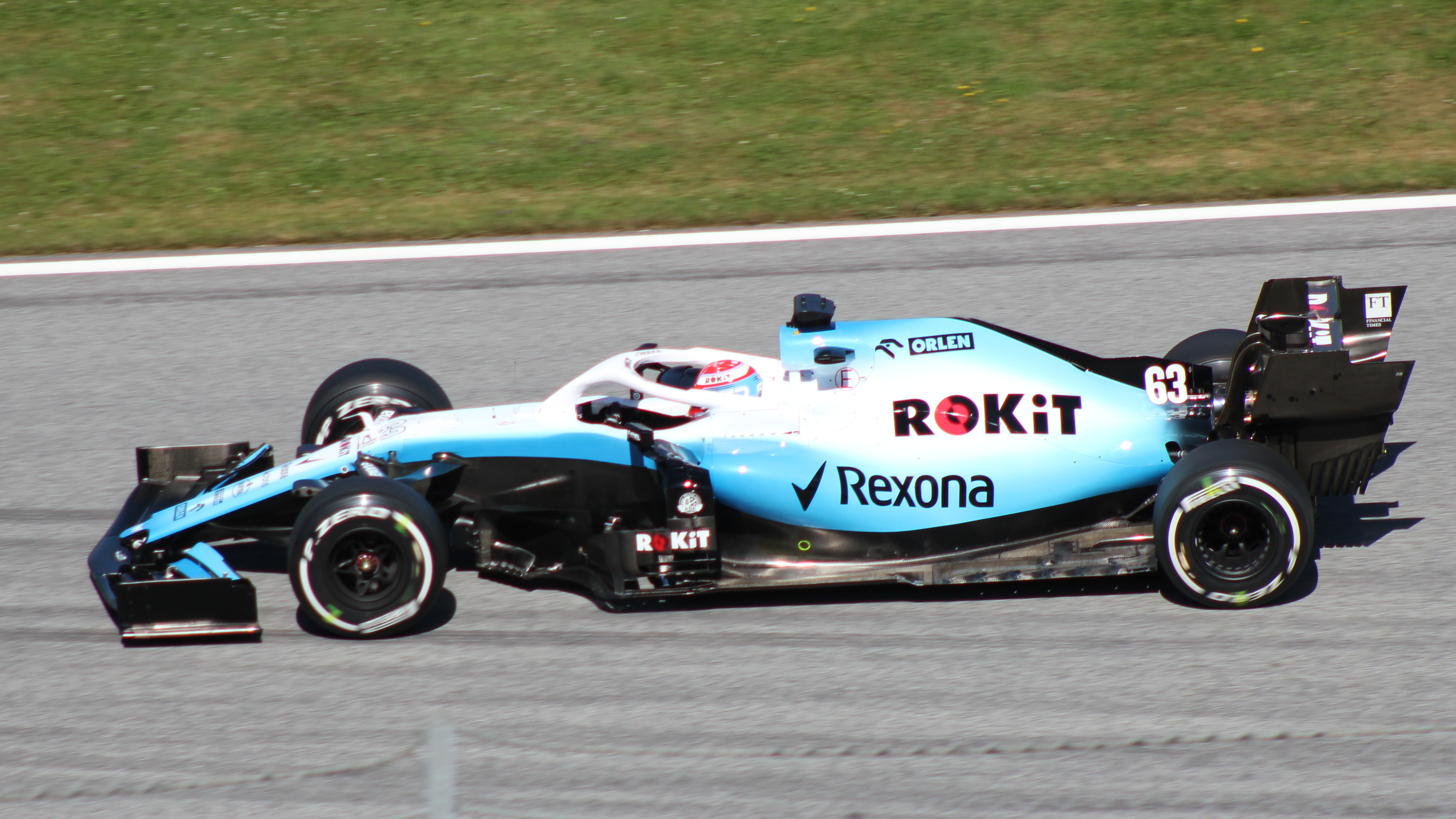
George Russell driving the Williams FW42 at the 2019 Austrian Grand Prix.

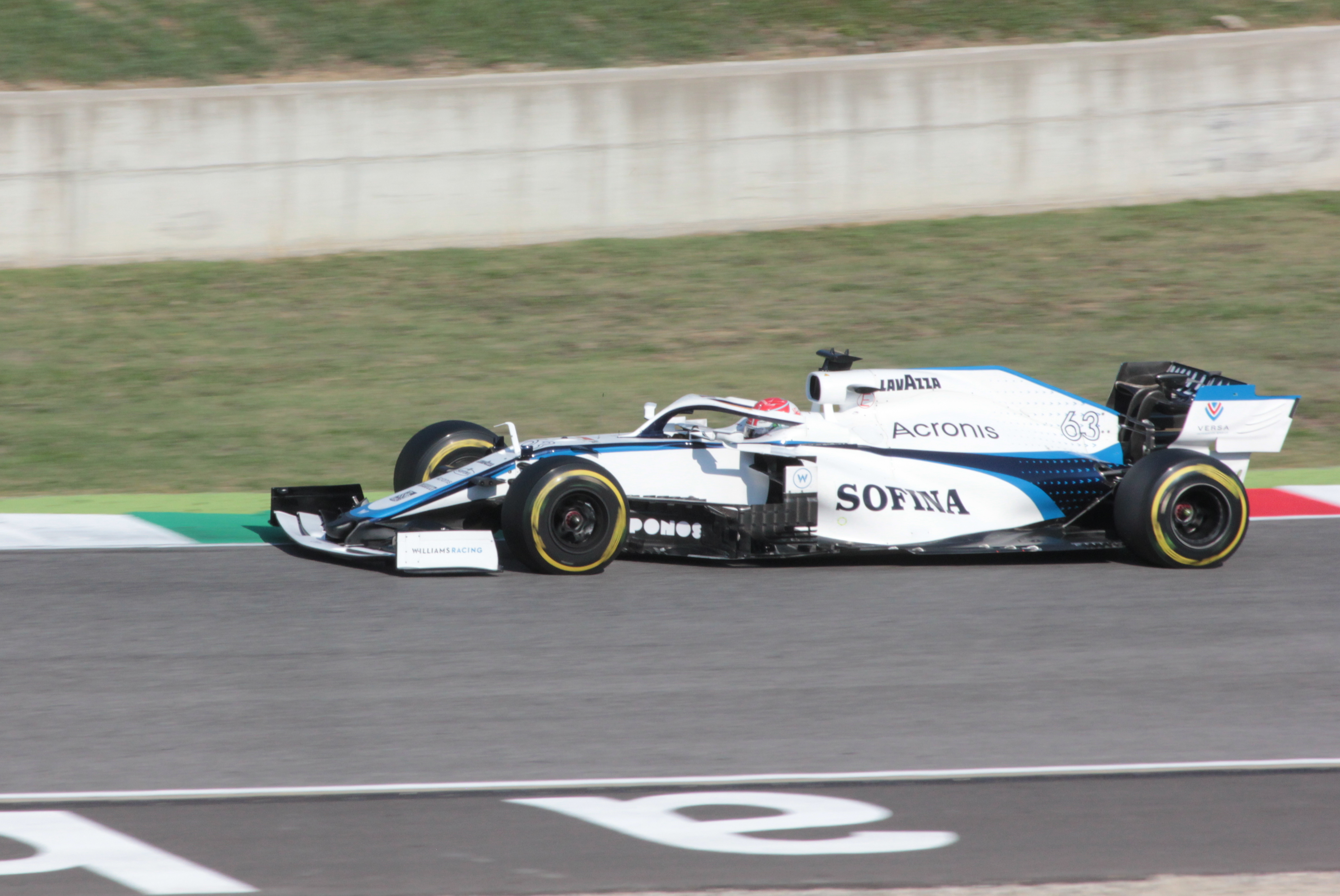
George Russell driving the Williams FW43 at the 2020 Tuscan Grand Prix.

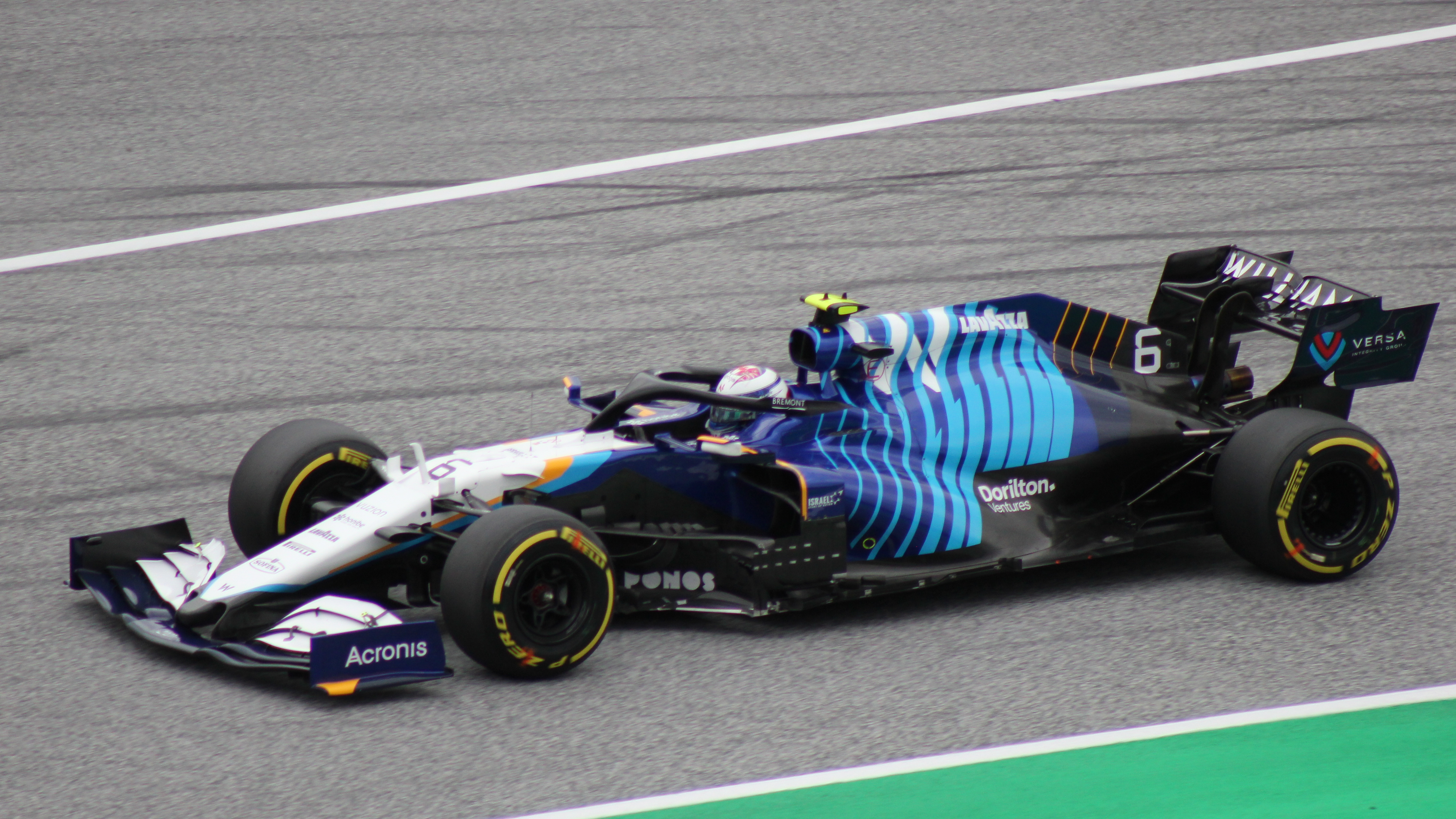
Nicholas Latifi driving the Williams FW43B at the 2021 Austrian Grand Prix.

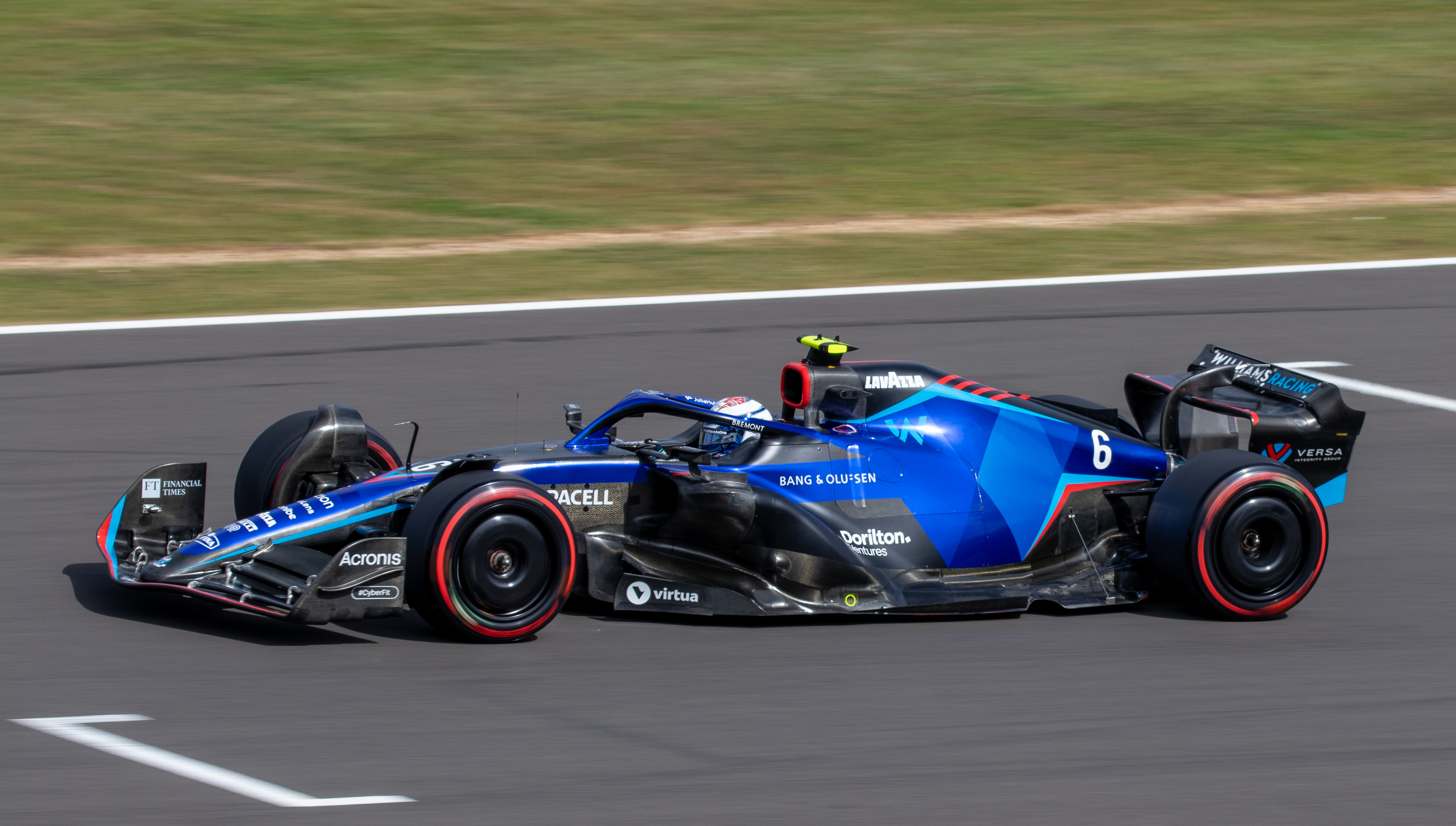
Nicholas Latifi driving the Williams FW44 at the 2022 British Grand Prix.

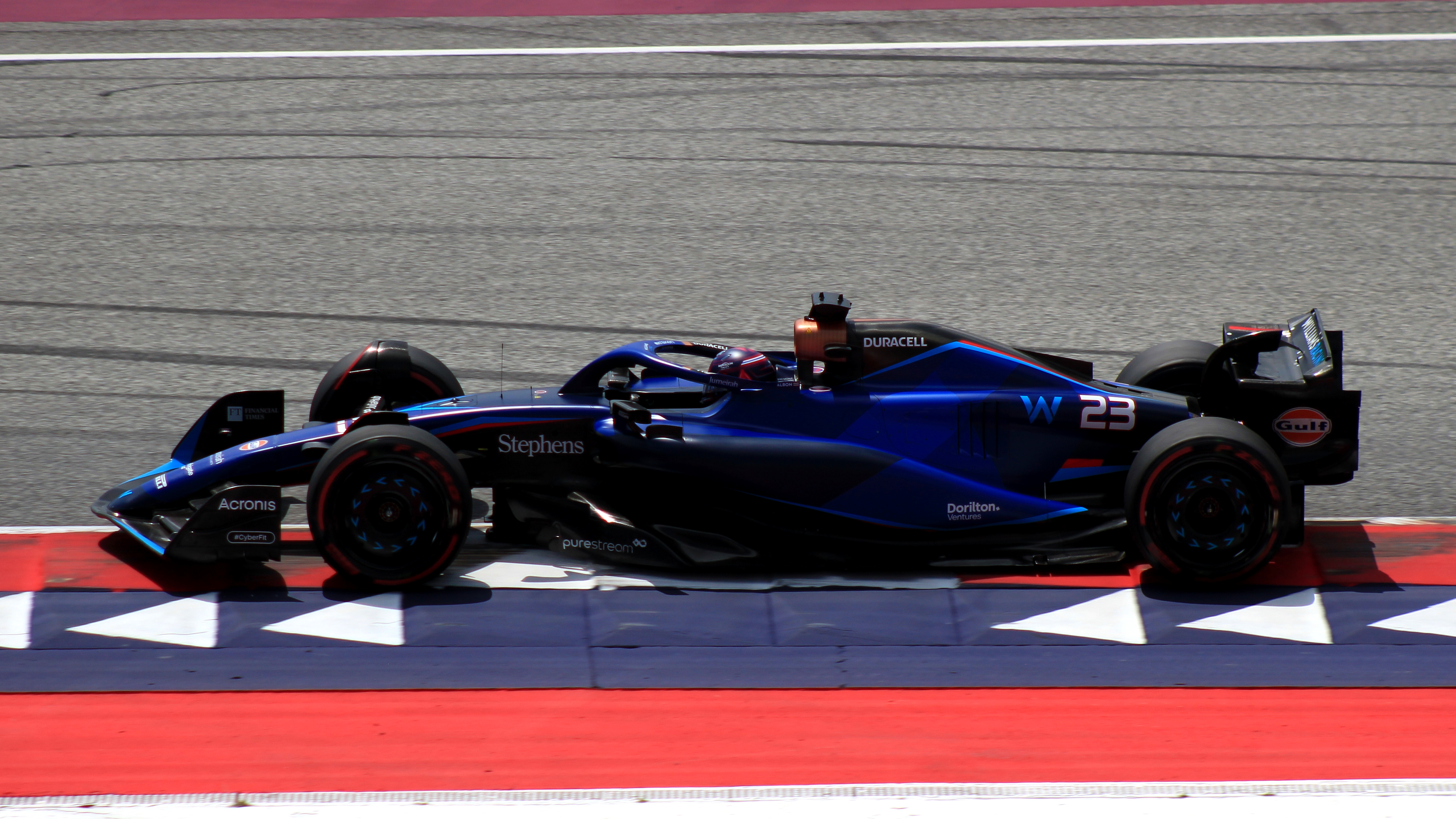
Alex Albon driving the Williams FW45 at the 2023 Austrian Grand Prix.

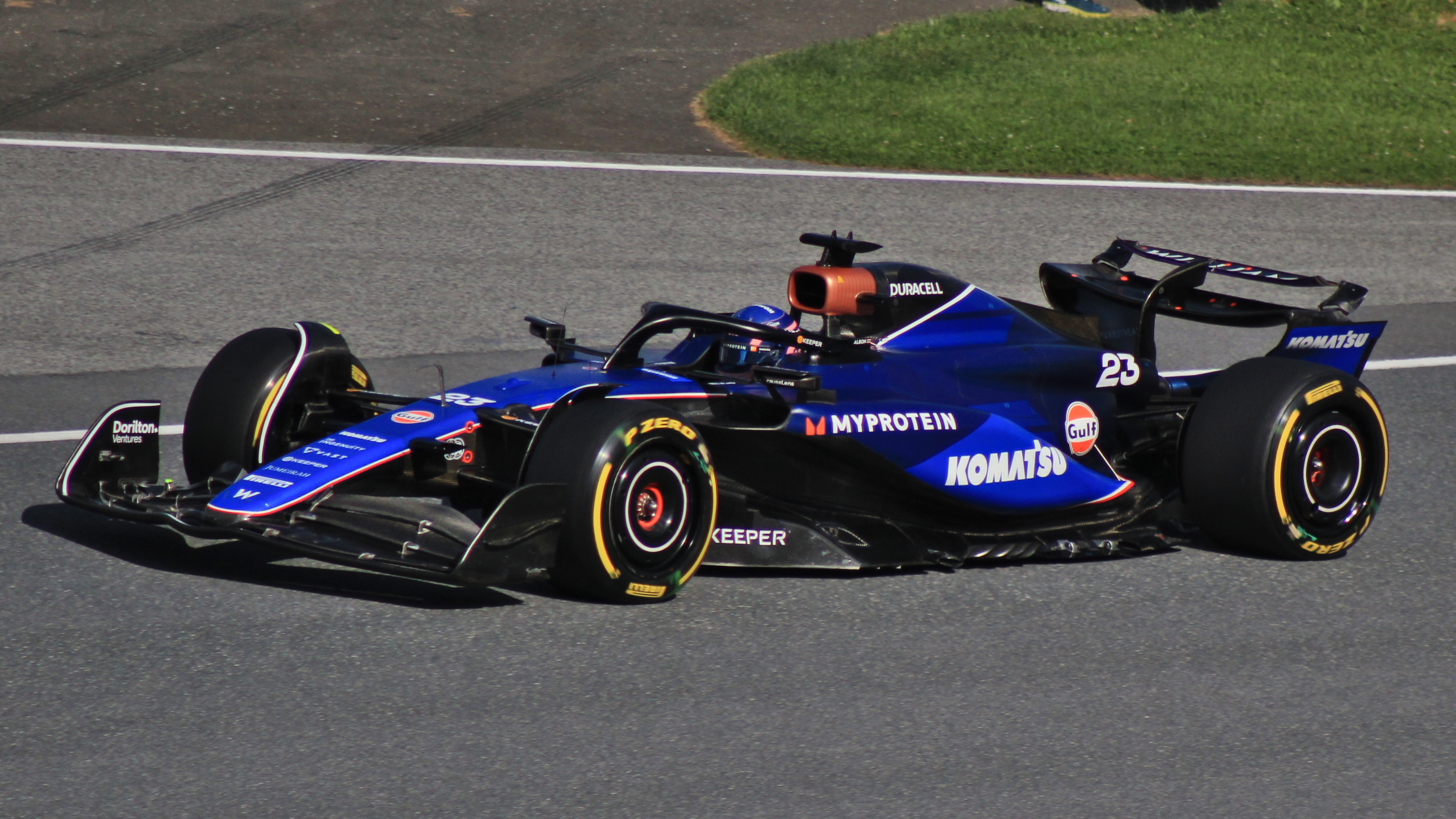
Alex Albon driving the Williams FW46 at the 2024 Austrian Grand Prix.

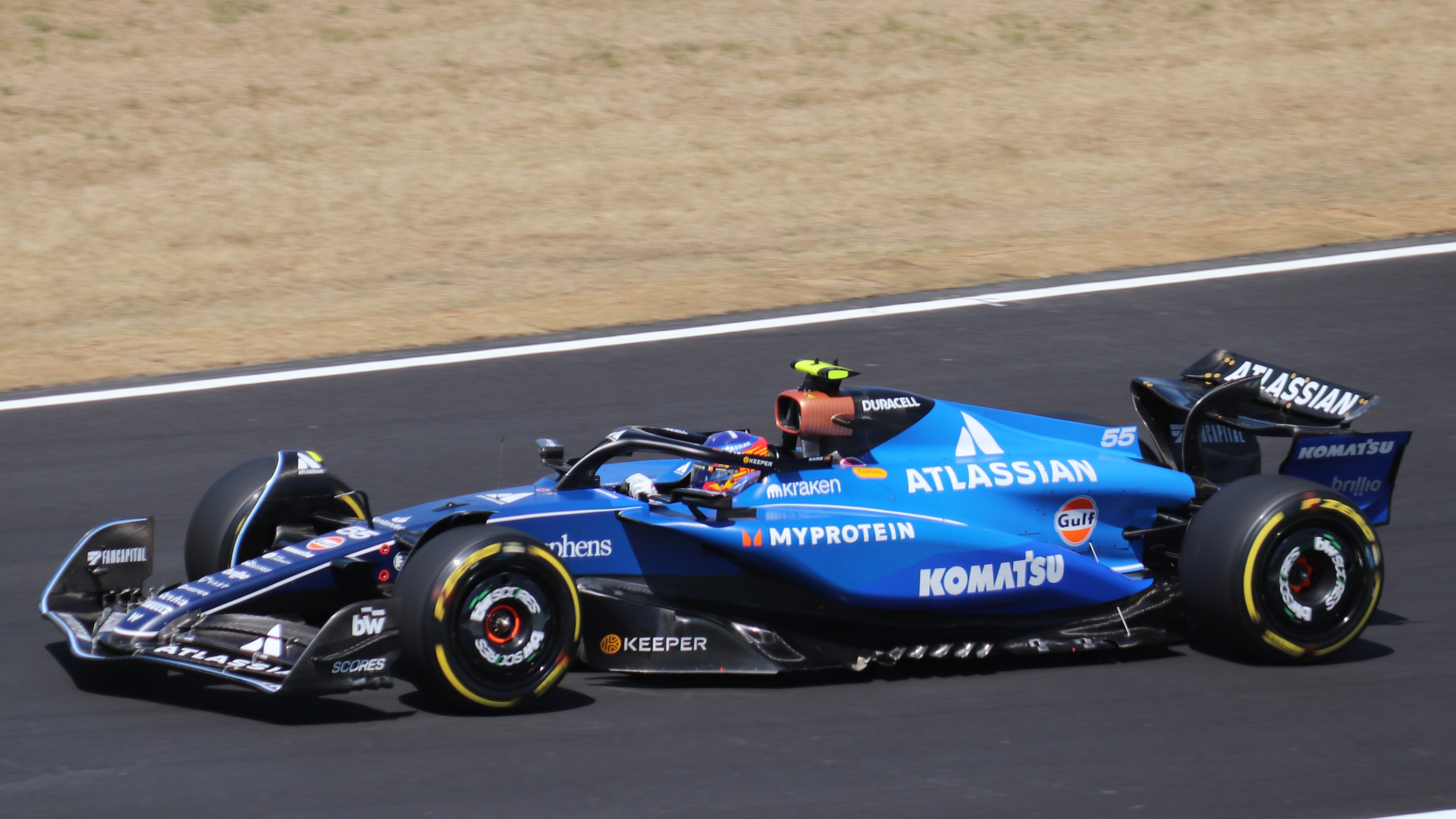
Carlos Sainz driving the Williams FW47 at the 2025 Japanese Grand Prix.

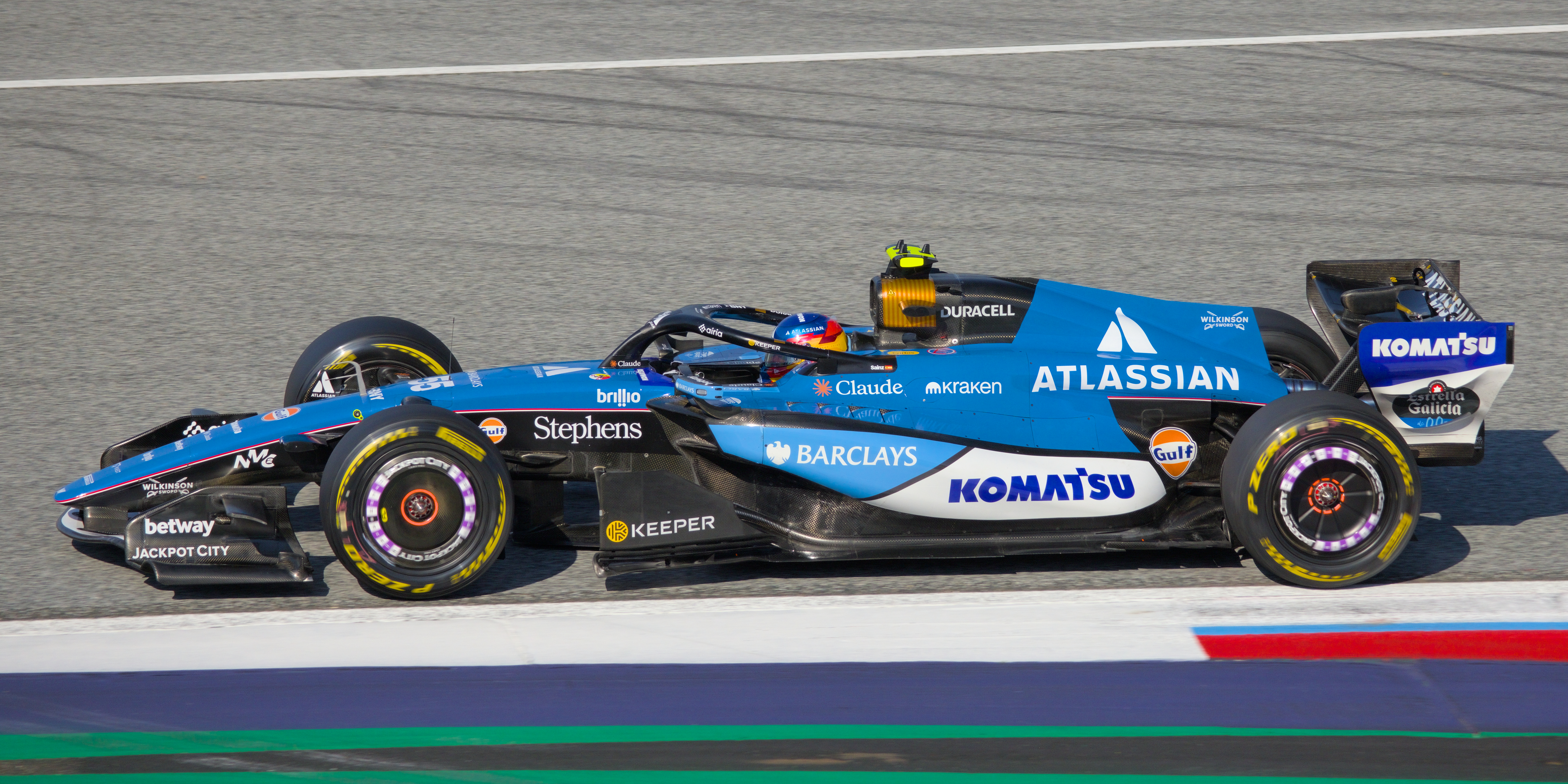
Carlos Sainz driving the Williams FW48 at the 2026 Austrian Grand Prix.

== Wolf ==
Year	Main colour(s)	Additional colour(s)	Livery sponsor(s)	Additional major sponsor(s)	Notes
1977–1978	Dark blue	Gold	Walter Wolf Racing	Castrol, Champion	A Canadian flag as a mark of the team's nationality.
1979	Dark blue	Gold	Walter Wolf Racing, Olympus	Castrol, Champion	A Canadian flag as a mark of the team's nationality.

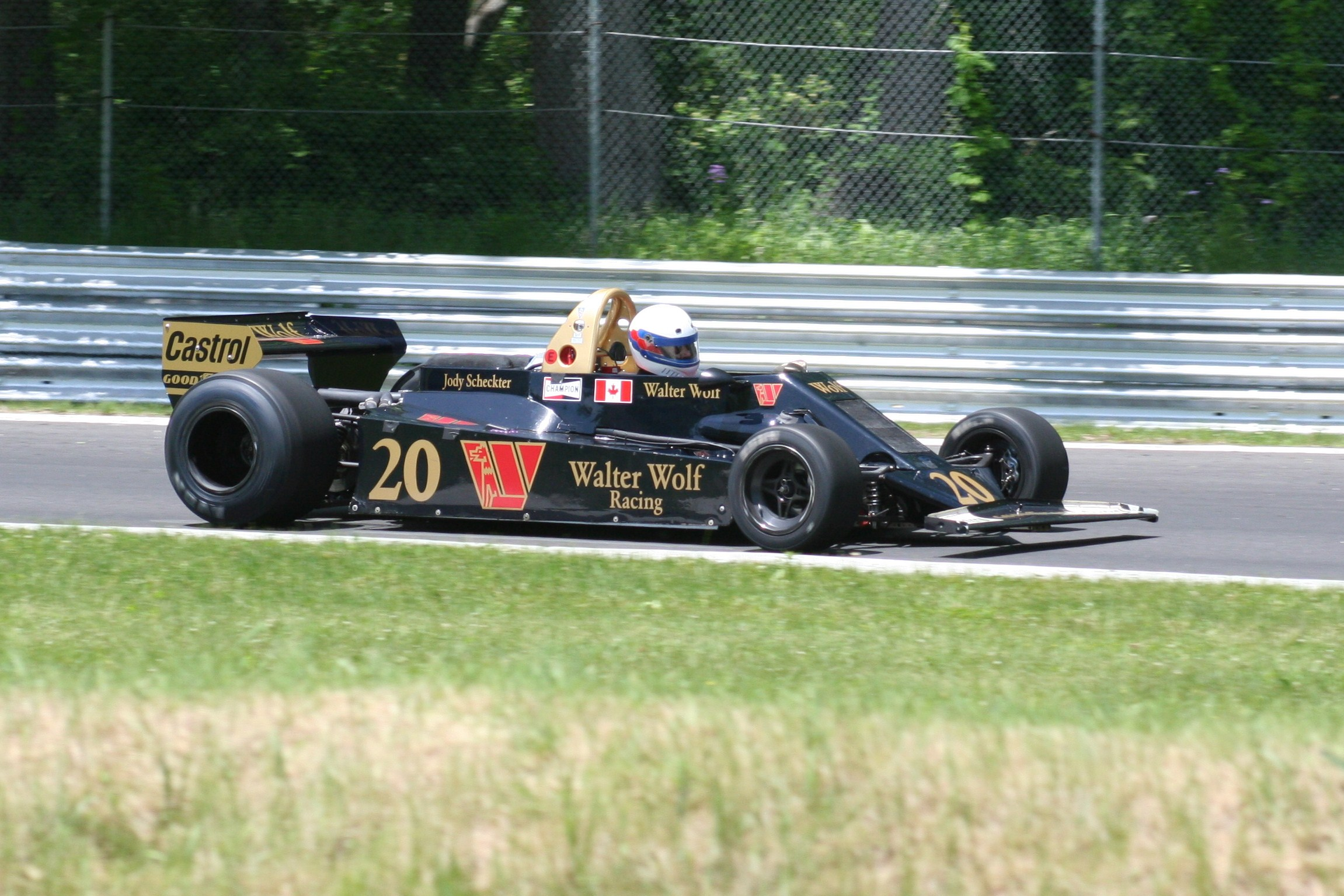
1978 Wolf WR6 being tested at Lime Rock

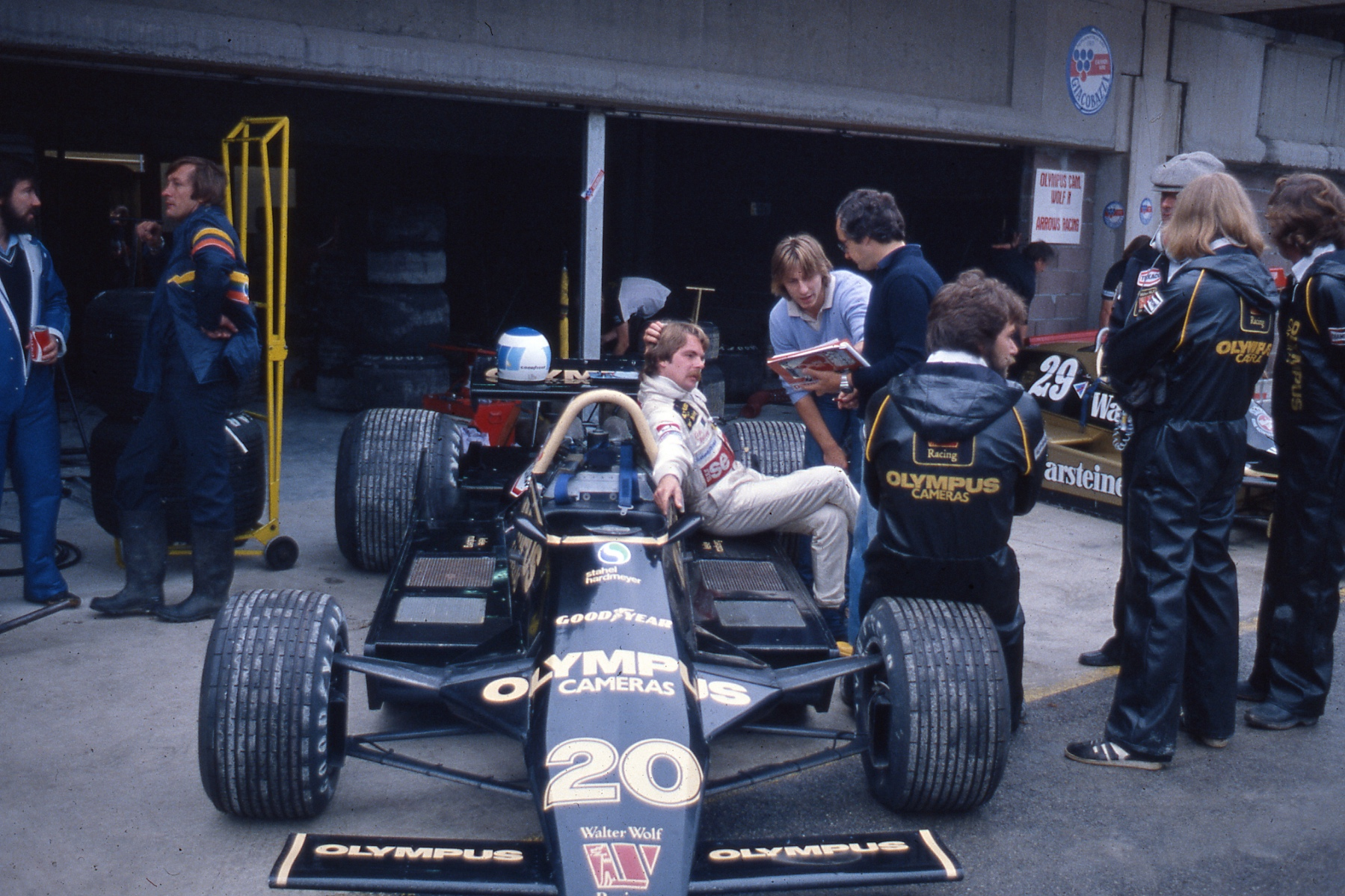
Keke Rosberg with his Wolf at the 1979 San Marino GP

== Zakspeed ==
Year	Main colour(s)	Additional colour(s)	Livery sponsor(s)	Additional major sponsor(s)	Non-tobacco/alcohol livery changes
1985–1989	Red	White	West	Shell (1985–1986), Goodyear (1985–1988), Pirelli (1989), Koni, Carlo Colusci, Fondmetal, Jever (1987), Geo Corporation (1989), Castrol (1987–1989), Yamaha (1989), BBS, Toshiba (1989), Sonax, KKK Turbos, Bosch	"West" was covered with black gaps or replaced with "East"

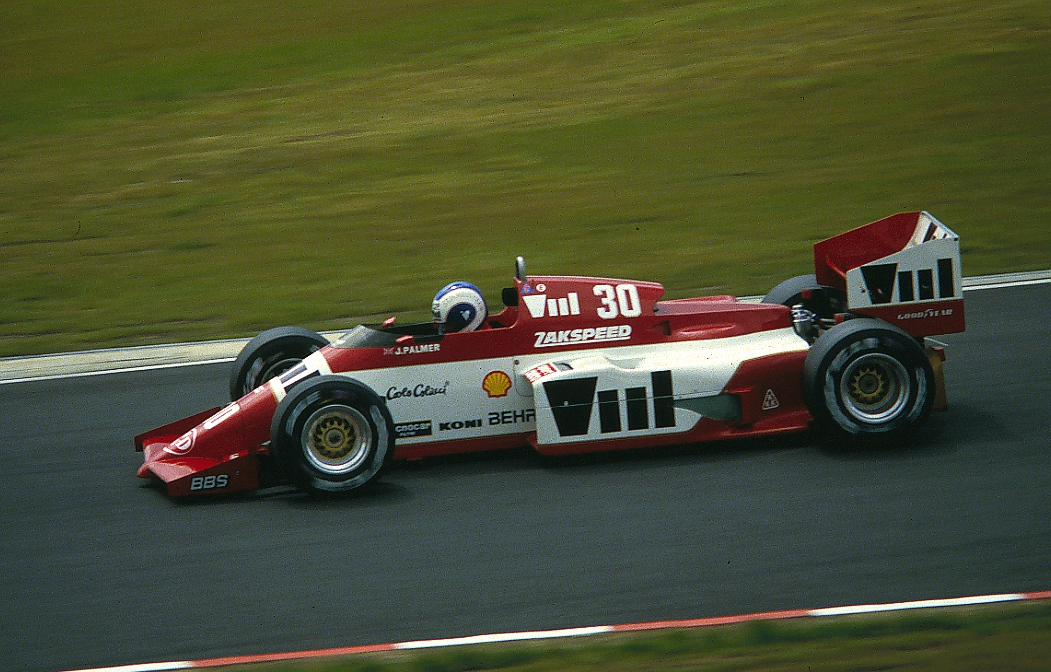
Jonathan Palmer driving for Zakspeed in 1985

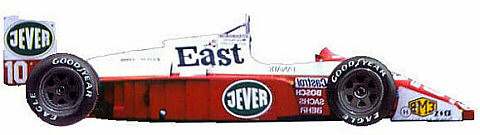
A Zakspeed 871 from the 1987 season

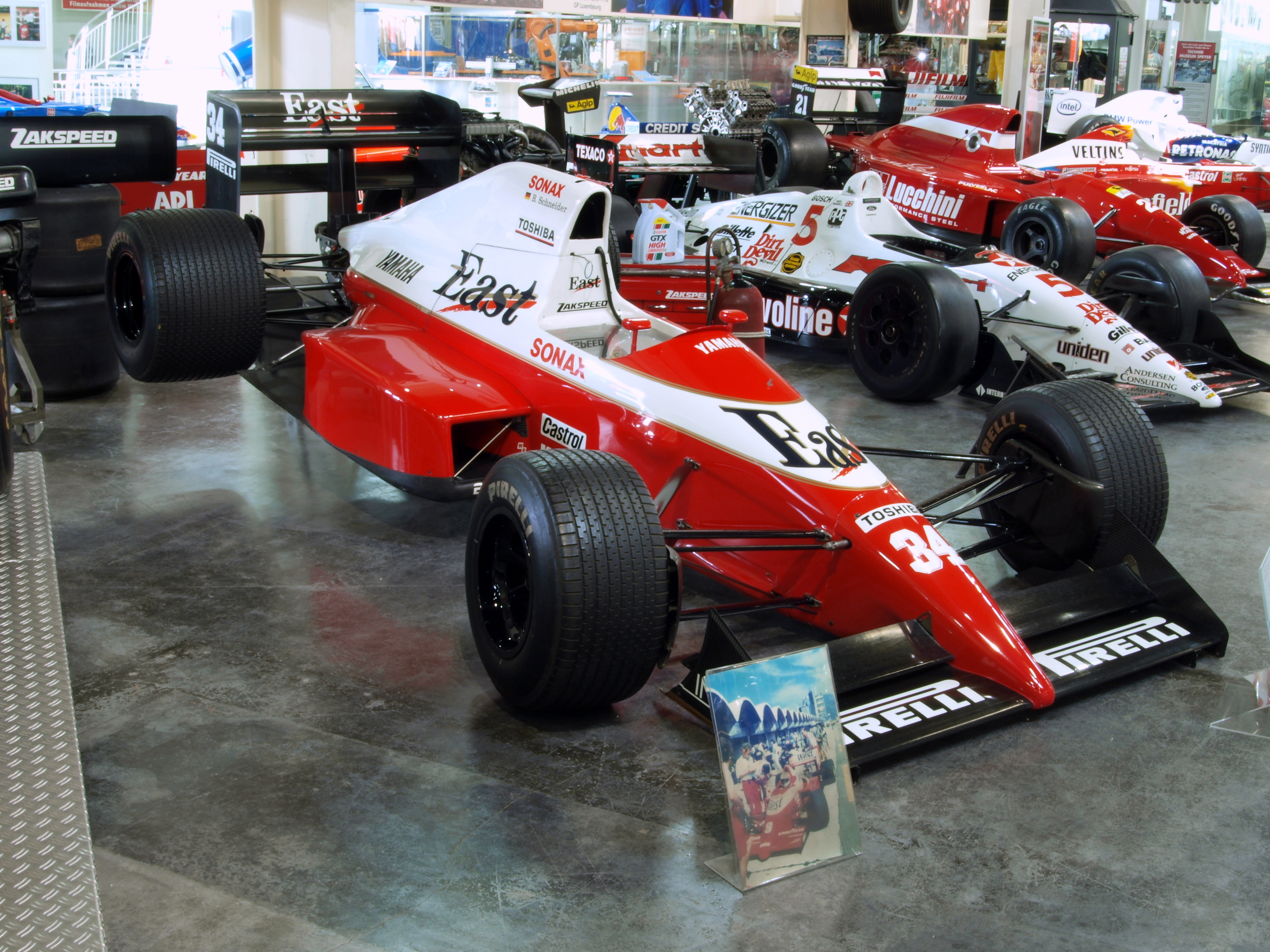
A Zakspeed 891 from the 1989 season at the Auto und Technik Museum in Sinsheim
